= 1993 in Kerala =

- Centuries
- Decades: 1970s; 1980s; 1990s; 2000s; 2010s
- See also: List of years in Kerala; History of Kerala

Events in the year 1993 in Kerala.

== Incumbents ==
Governor of Kerala -

- B. Rachaiah

Chief minister of Kerala –

- K. Karunakaran

== Events ==
- 29 July - Chekannur Maulavi allegedly abducted by Islamic fundamentalists and disappeared.
- 30 August - Asianet started it's broadcasting as first private channel in Malayalam.
- 6 October - Kannur Kotta rape case
- October - Nearly 500 women in Kollada village near Cherupuzha observed Kitchen Bandh in protest to Kotta rape case.
- 16 December - T. M. Jacob leaves Kerala Congress over differences with K. M. Mani and forms Kerala Congress (Jacob).
- December - British Bank of Middle East open the first ATM of Kerala at Vellayambalam.

== Births ==
- Sagar Surya - March 15
- Kalyani Priyadarshan - April 5
- Arjun Ashokan - August 24
- Gokul Suresh - September 29
- Kalidas Jayaram - December 16

== Deaths ==
- 22 November - P. A. Backer, Film director, (b. 1940)
- 30 November - Sebastian Kappen, theologist, (b. 1924)

== See also ==
- History of Kerala
- 1993 in India
