= 1992 in Kerala =

- Centuries
- Decades: 1970s; 1980s; 1990s; 2000s; 2010s
- See also: List of years in Kerala; History of Kerala

Events in the year 1992 in Kerala.

== Incumbents ==
Governor of Kerala -

- B. Rachaiah

Chief minister of Kerala –

- K. Karunakaran

== Events ==
- 31 January - A Fire accident involving a railway wagon carrying fuel due to Kerosene lamp used in Railway signal claims three lives in Kannur.
- 28 February - The first national level private airlines East-West Airlines (India) had its first commercial flight between Bombay and Kochi.
- 27 March - The sensational Sister Abhaya murder case took place.
- 3 June - Chief minister of Kerala K. Karunakaran suffered a near fatal car accident near Attingal on his way to capital.
- 19 - 22 July - Communal riots in Poonthura, Thiruvananthapuram district.
- 6 August - Abdul Nazer Mahdani loses his leg in a bomb attack at Mynagappally.
- 14 August - Kerala High Court declared that election of O. Bharathan of Communist Party of India (Marxist) to Edakkad Assembly constituency is void on grounds of Electoral fraud and declared K. Sudhakaran as the winner.
- 18 August - The West Coast canal between Kollam and Kottappuram along with Champakkara and Udhyogmandal Canals in Kochi declared as National Waterway 3.
- November - Heavy rains in Kerala causing floods in Pathanamthitta district and opening of shutters of Idukki Dam.

=== Dates unknown ===
- C. K. Janu floats Adivasi Development Action Committee.

== Deaths ==
- 5 December - Monisha Unni, actress (b.1971)
- 8 December - Thoppil Bhasi, writer and politician (b.1924)

== See also ==
- History of Kerala
- 1992 in India
