= 1994 in Kerala =

- Centuries
- Decades: 1970s; 1980s; 1990s; 2000s; 2010s
- See also: List of years in Kerala; History of Kerala

Events in the year 1994 in Kerala.

== Incumbents ==
Governor of Kerala –

- B. Rachaiah

Chief minister of Kerala –

- K. Karunakaran

== Events ==
- 1 January – Communist Party of India (Marxist) expels senior leader K. R. Gouri Amma from the party.
- 9 January – Prime Minister of India P. V. Narasimha Rao opens Guruvayur–Thrissur railway line.
- 25 January – Communist Party of India (Marxist) workers chops of two legs of a Rashtriya Swayamsevak Sangh worker named C. Sadanandan Master in Mattanur.
- 23 February – All India Radio station at Devikulam commissioned.
- 16 June – Finance Minister Oommen Chandy submits resignation.
- 20 October – Maldivian woman Mariam Rasheeda gets arrested under The Foreigners Act, 1946.
- 13 November – Kerala Police claims that they have cracked ISRO espionage case.
- 25 November – Koothuparamba firing against Democratic Youth Federation of India workers.

=== Dates unknown ===
- Makkal Samaram against Valiya Kannoth Anthru Haji challenging polygamy and inheritance issues among Malabar Muslims by CPIM leader and MLA from Meppayur Assembly constituency A Kanaran at Nadapuram.

== Deaths ==
- 17 March – Elenjikal Chandy Kuruvila, Western Fleet commander during 1971 war (b.1922).
- 5 July – Vaikom Muhammad Basheer, Writer Freedom Fighter (b.1908)
- 30 November – Lakshmi N. Menon, politician, (b.1899).

== See also ==
- History of Kerala
- 1994 in India
