= 1991 in Kerala =

- Centuries
- Decades: 1970s; 1980s; 1990s; 2000s; 2010s
- See also: List of years in Kerala; History of Kerala

Events in the year 1991 in Kerala.

== Incumbents ==
Governor of Kerala -

- B. Rachaiah

Chief ministers of Kerala –

- E. K. Nayanar till June
- K. Karunakaran from June

== Events ==
- 5 April - Kerala High Court upholds ban on entry of women between a certain age to Sabarimala.
- 18 April - In a formal event presided by E. K. Nayanar Chelakkodan Ayisha declares Kerala as a 100% literate state.
- 15 May - Babu Chazhikadan, UDF candidate for Ettumanoor Assembly constituency died due to Lightning strike during election campaign.
- 18 June - 1991 Kerala Legislative Assembly election held.
- 6 July - The hanging of Ripper Chandran, the last capital punishment in Kerala (as of 2024).
- 15 December - Mepparamba firing incident claims one life in Palakkad district.

== Deaths ==
- 24 January - Padmarajan, director (b.1945)

== See also ==
- History of Kerala
- 1991 in India
