= Nilambur Pattulsavam =

Municipality in northern Kerala, India

Nilambur is a municipality in northern Kerala, about 40 km inland from Malappuram. Most of the town's residents are engaged in merchant practices and the surrounding villages are occupied by farmers who grow rubber, rice, pepper and other spices. The town is close to the Chaliyar River which is famous for having the oldest teak plantation in the world and beautiful forests and wildlife. It is situated near the Western Ghats and within 100 km of the popular hill station, Ooty.

Nilambur pattulsavam is a tourism festival organised by the Nilambur municipality and trade organisations . Earlier kovilakam, the royal family conducted the festival. Nilambur Pattu and Kovilakam are the two things associated with Nilambur heritage. Every year Vettekaran Pattu is held for two weeks in the first weeks of January. Not much is known about the history behind the Nilambur Pattu, but the legends say that every year the tribal people, who used to live in and around the Nilambur forests, come to pay homage to the royal family of the Nilambur Kovilakam. In Kerala history, Nilambur Kovilakam played a vital role in Northern Kerala but, at present, the princely family is just another family. Nilambur Pattulsavam gives the residents the opportunity to cherish old memories of the Nilambur Kovilakam.

Now Nilambur Pattu became a festival and celebration time more than cultural event. Peoples from every religion participate in these festivals as it became a festival of Nilambur.
