= 1989 in Kerala =

- Centuries
- Decades: 1960s; 1970s; 1980s; 1990s; 2000s
- See also: List of years in Kerala; History of Kerala

Events in the year 1989 in Kerala.

== Incumbents ==
Governor of Kerala -

- Ram Dulari Sinha

Chief ministers of Kerala –

- E. K. Nayanar

== Events ==
- 12 June - Kottayam becomes the first town in India to achieve 100% literacy.
- 20 June - A tunnel under construction of 109 crore worth Lower Periyar Hydel Project crashes. Indian National Congress raises corruption allegation against CPI(M) minister T. Sivadasa Menon.
- 1 November - All India Radio launches the first FM broadcasting station in state at Kochi.
- November - United Democratic Front (Kerala) sweeps the 1989 Parliament elections in Kerala.
- 31 December - Muhammad Ali visits Kozhikode following personal invitation by K.P. Hassan Haji secretary of JDT Islam institutions and attends silver jubilee of Muslim Educational Society.

=== Date unknown ===
- February/March - The apex scholarly body of Muslims in Kerala, Samastha splits into AP faction and EK faction following Kanthapuram A. P. Aboobacker Musliyar staging SYS meeting in Ernakulam and openly voicing dissent on allegiance with Indian Union Muslim League.
- Kerala faced acute Electricity shortage due to reduction from central allocations.

== Birth ==
- 23 February - Shamna Kasim, actress.

== Deaths ==
- 16 January - Prem Nazir, actor (b.1926)

== See also ==
- History of Kerala
- 1989 in India
