= 1995 in Kerala =

- Centuries
- Decades: 1970s; 1980s; 1990s; 2000s; 2010s
- See also: List of years in Kerala; History of Kerala

Events in the year 1995 in Kerala.

== Incumbents ==
Governors of Kerala -

- B. Rachaiah - till November
- P. Shiv Shankar - from November

Chief ministers of Kerala –

- K. Karunakaran - till March 16th
- A.K. Antony - from March 22nd.

== Events ==
- 1 March - Head priest of Sabarimala Temple Kattoor Kuttapilly Vishnu Namboothiri suspended by Travancore Devaswom Board for attending prayer at St. Thomas Ecumenical Church, Nilackal.
- 16 March - Fourth Karunakaran ministry dissolved following announcement of resignation of K. Karunakaran.
- 12 April - Communist Party of India (Marxist) leader E. P. Jayarajan got shot with a gun as an attempt on his life in a moving train (Chennai Rajdhani Express) near Ongole.
- 14 May - Communal riots in Vizhinjam claims six lives.
- 30 September - The first live news broadcasting by a private sector media carried out by Asianet News.
- September - Kerala Police finds more than 100 pipe-bombs from under a bridge in Vengara, Malappuram district.
- 1 October - Secretary of Personnel and Administrative Reforms Department Kerala Brij Kishore Jaiswar IAS, found dead in his house later his wife Mohini was arrested in connection with murder.
- 11 October - Police action in Sivagiri Asramam following unrest between two sanyasi groups over board presidency.
- 22 October - Fourteen lives claimed by hooch tragedy in Fort Kochi.
- Goat - Mangium - Teak High-yield investment scam comes into light. Crores of money fizzled away by two Kozhikode natives through a bogus entity named HYS Foundation, Palakkad.

== Deaths ==
- 25 February - Rani Mariam Vattalil, Religious sister (b.1954).
- 19 June - P. N. Panicker, father of library movement in Kerala (b. 1909).
- 13 November - Thakiyudeen Abdul Wahid, MD and founder of East-West Airlines (India) (b.1952)

== See also ==
- History of Kerala
- 1995 in India
