= 1990 in Kerala =

- Centuries
- Decades: 1970s; 1980s; 1990s; 2000s; 2010s
- See also: List of years in Kerala; History of Kerala

Events in the year 1990 in Kerala.

== Incumbents ==
Governor of Kerala -

- Ram Dulari Sinha till February
- Sarup Singh February to December
- B. Rachaiah from December

Chief ministers of Kerala –

- E. K. Nayanar

== Events ==
- 15 January - R. Balakrishna Pillai gets disqualified from Kerala Legislative Assembly under Anti-defection law (India).
- 4 February -V. P. Singh declares Ernakulam district as the first totally Literate district in India.
- 7 February - Anglicised names of various districts in state changed through notification G.O. (P) 133/90/RD in Gazette.
- 1 April - The Kerala Public Works Department got bifurcated to create a separate Irrigation Department.
- 28 July - India's first IT Park, Technopark, Trivandrum established.
- August - October - Evacuation of Non Resident Keralites from Kuwait following Gulf War.
- 1 November - Padma Ramachandran IAS becomes the first women Chief secretary of Kerala.

== Births ==
- Basil Joseph - April 28
- Pranav Mohanlal - July 13
- Anusree - October 24

== Deaths ==
- 14 January - Mani Madhava Chakyar, artist of Chakyar koothu and Koodiyattam (b.1899)
- 29 March - Adoor Bhasi, actor (b.1927)

== See also ==
- History of Kerala
- 1990 in India
