= Kannur Kotta rape case =

The Kannur Kotta rape case refers to the gang rape of a married Muslim woman by her husband along with his friends at the Kannur Fort in the year 1993. The case was landmark event in the history of Kerala with woman rights activists organising a Kitchen bandh and a sustained campaign to bring the guilty to justice. The husband Ibrahim and his four friends were convicted and imprisoned for 7 years, and ordered to pay Rs 50,000 each as restitution to the victim.
