= Poonthura =

- Town
- Location in Kerala, India
- Coordinates: 8°26′25″N 76°56′44″E
- Country: India
- State: Kerala
- District: Thiruvananthapuram

Languages
  - Official: Malayalam
- Time zone: UTC+5:30 (IST)
- PIN: 695026
- Telephone code: 0471
- Vehicle registration: KL-01
- Nearest city: Trivandrum
- Lok Sabha constituency: Trivandrum

Poonthura is a suburb of Thiruvananthapuram, the capital of Kerala, India. It is on the landing path of flights to Thiruvananthapuram International Airport and is about 5 kilometers from the capital city.

== Poonthura riots ==
The hamlet of Poonthura witnessed several incidents of communal violence as an aftermath of the Babri Masjid demolition in 1992. The most serious incidents occurred between 19 July and 21 July 1992 and are known as the Poonthura riots. The then DGP C Subramaniam was in Chennai without submitting proper leave application whereas the next seniormost officer and then ADGP (Intelligence) Jayaram Padikkal had not acted.

Trouble was anticipated in Trivandrum, with the Rashtriya Swayamsevak Sangh (RSS) and its Islamic equivalent, the recently formed Islamic Sevak Sangh (ISS), which was accused of having started the riots in the Kochi region in April 1992, taunting each other with provocative speeches and meetings over events in Ayodhya. The tempers spilled onto the streets. Two days of rioting left six dead, 20 injured, and hundreds of businesses and houses looted.

The violence was sparked by reports of ISS activists throwing stones at an RSS drill. Soon there were pitched battles all over the city. The highly politicized police force seemed to be in a stupor. A Government instruction to only fire in the air was leaked to the rioting groups, and hence the looting and rioting happened right in front of police personnel firing in the air. Later, about 100 people were arrested, but many were released owing to political pressure. The political interference was from one of the constituents of the ruling UDF itself - the Indian Union Muslim League. The IUML, had been under pressure to break with the UDF over the Ayodhya issue.

== Education ==
- St. Philomena's Girls High School, Poonthura
- St Thomas Higher secondary school, Poonthura
