= History of Kerala =

Kerala was first epigraphically recorded as Cheras (Keralaputra) in a 3rd-century BCE rock inscription by the Mauryan emperor Ashoka of Magadha. It was mentioned as one of four independent kingdoms in southern India during Ashoka's rule, the others being the Cholas, Pandyas and Satyaputras. The Cheras transformed Kerala into an international trade centre by establishing trade relations across the Arabian Sea with all major Mediterranean and Red Sea ports as well those of Eastern Africa and the Far East. The dominion of Cheras was located in one of the key routes of the ancient Indian Ocean trade. The early Cheras collapsed after repeated attacks from the neighboring Cholas and Rashtrakutas.

In the 8th century, Adi Shankara was born in Kalady in central Kerala. He travelled extensively across the Indian subcontinent founding institutions of the widely influential philosophy of Advaita Vedanta. The Cheras regained control over Kerala in the 9th century until the kingdom was dissolved in the 12th century, after which small autonomous chiefdoms, most notably the Kingdom of Kozhikode, arose. The ports of Kozhikode and Kochi acted as major gateways to the western coast of medieval South India for several foreign entities. These entities included the Chinese, the Arabs, the Persians, various groups from Eastern Africa, various kingdoms from Southeast Asia including the Malacca Sultanate, and later on, the Europeans.

In the 14th century, the Kerala school of astronomy and mathematics was founded by Madhava of Sangamagrama in the Kingdom of Tanur. Some of the contributions of the school included the discovery of the infinite series and taylor series of some trigonometry functions.

In 1498, with the help of Gujarati merchants, Portuguese traveler Vasco Da Gama established a sea route to Kozhikode by sailing around the Cape of Good Hope, located in the southernmost region of Africa. His navy raised Portuguese forts and even minor settlements, which marked the beginning of European influences in India. European trading interests of the Dutch, French and the British took center stage in Kerala.

In 1741, the Dutch were defeated by Travancore king Marthanda Varma. After this humiliating defeat, Dutch military commanders were taken hostage by Marthanda Varma, and they were forced to train the Travancore military with modern European weaponry. This resulted in Travancore being able to defend itself from further European aggression. By the late 18th century, most of the influence in Kerala came from the British. The British crown gained control over Northern Kerala through the creation of the Malabar District. The British also allied with the princely states of Travancore and Cochin in the southern part of the state.

When India declared independence in 1947, Travancore originally sought to establish itself as a fully sovereign nation. However, an agreement was made by the then King of Travancore Chithira Thirunal Balarama Varma to have Travancore join India, albeit after many rounds of negotiation. The Malabar District and the Kingdom of Cochin were peacefully annexed into India without much hassle. The state of Kerala was created in 1956 from the former state of Travancore-Cochin, the Malabar district and the Kasaragod taluk of South Canara District of Madras state. The state is called Keralam in Malayalam, due to its grammatical addition of Anusvara.

== Other names ==
The term Malabar has historically been used in foreign trade circles as a general name for Kerala. In earlier times, the term Malabar had also been used to denote Tulu Nadu and Kanyakumari which lie contiguous to Kerala on the southwestern coast of India, in addition to the modern state of Kerala. The people of Malabar were known as Malabars. From the time of Cosmas Indicopleustes (6th century CE) itself, the Roman sailors used to call Kerala as Male. The first element of the name, however, is attested already in the Topography written by Cosmas Indicopleustes. This mentions a pepper emporium called Male, which clearly gave its name to Malabar ('the country of Male'). The name Male is thought to come from the Dravidian word Mala ('hill'). Al-Biruni (AD 973–1048) must have been the first writer to call this state Malabar. Author such as Al-Baladhuri mention Malabar ports in their works. The Arab writers had called this place Malibar, Manibar, Mulibar, and Munibar. Malabar is reminiscent of the word Malanad which means the land of hills. According to William Logan, the word Malabar comes from a combination of the Dravidian word Mala (hill) and the Persian/Arabic word Barr (country/continent).

== Traditional sources ==
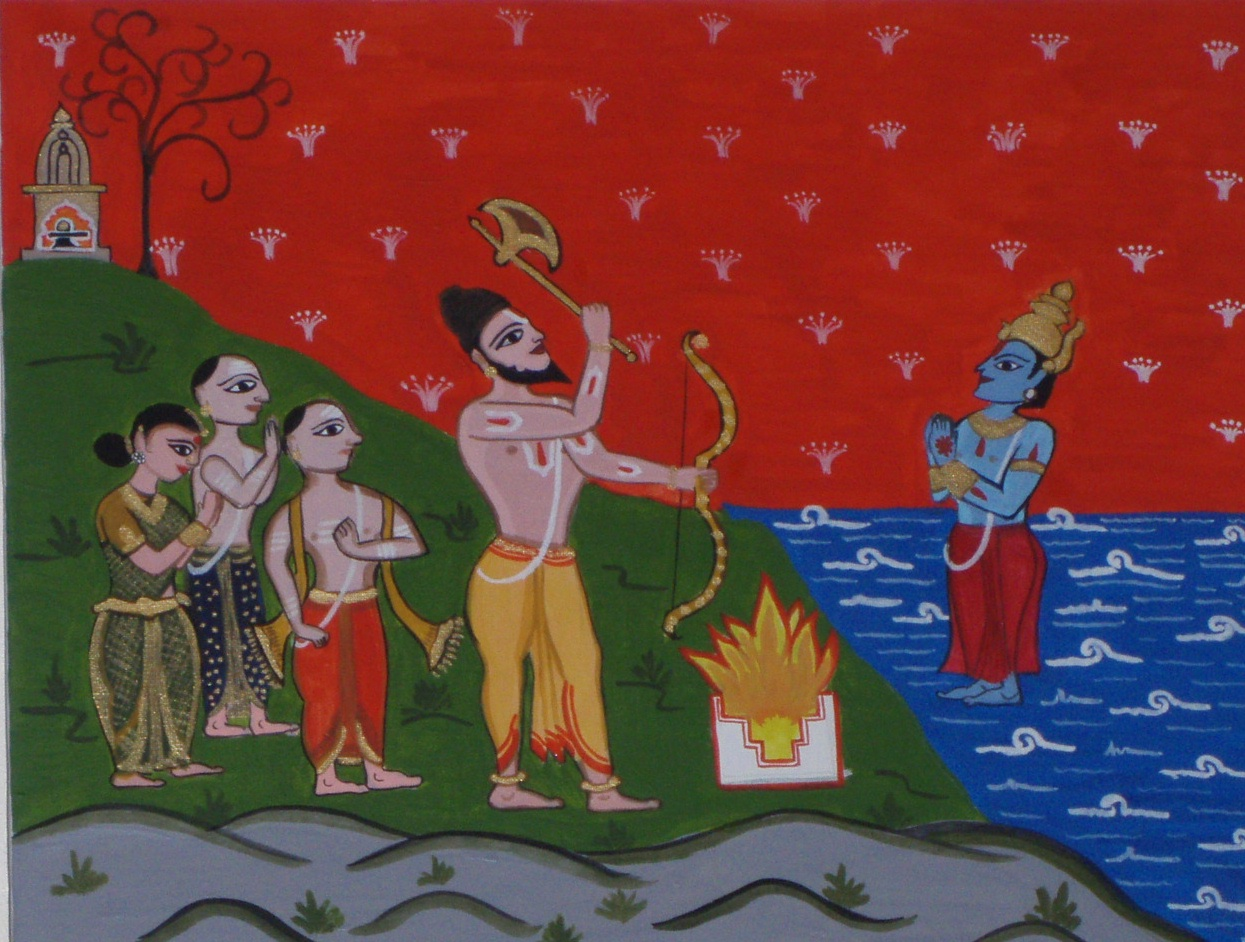
Parasurama, surrounded by settlers, commanding Varuna to part the seas and reveal Kerala.

=== Mahabali ===
Perhaps the most famous festival of Kerala, Onam, is deeply rooted in Kerala traditions. Onam is associated with the legendary king Mahabali (Maveli), who according to tradition and Puranas, ruled the Earth and several other planetary systems from Kerala. His entire kingdom was then a land of immense prosperity and happiness. However, Mahabali was tricked into giving up his rule, and was thus overthrown by Vamana (Thrikkakkarayappan), the fifth Avatar (earthly incarnation) of Lord Vishnu. He was banished from the Earth to rule over one of the netherworld (Patala) planets called Sutala by Vamana. Mahabali comes back to visit Kerala every year on the occasion of Onam.

=== Other texts ===
The oldest of all the Puranas, the Matsya Purana, sets the story of the Matsya Avatar (fish incarnation) of Lord Vishnu, in the Western Ghats. The earliest Sanskrit text to mention Kerala by name as Cherapadah is the Aitareya Aranyaka, a late Vedic work on philosophy. It is also mentioned in both the Ramayana and the Mahabharata.

=== Parasurama and Cenkuttuvan ===
There are legends dealing with the origins of Kerala geographically and culturally. One such legend is the retrieval of Kerala from the sea, by Parasurama, a warrior sage. It proclaims that Parasurama, an Avatar of Mahavishnu, threw His battle axe into the sea. As a result, the land of Kerala arose, and thus was reclaimed from the waters. This legend shares parallels with an earlier legend where Chera King Vel Kezhu Kuttavan, who when enraged, threw his axe into the sea and caused it to retreat.

=== Ophir ===
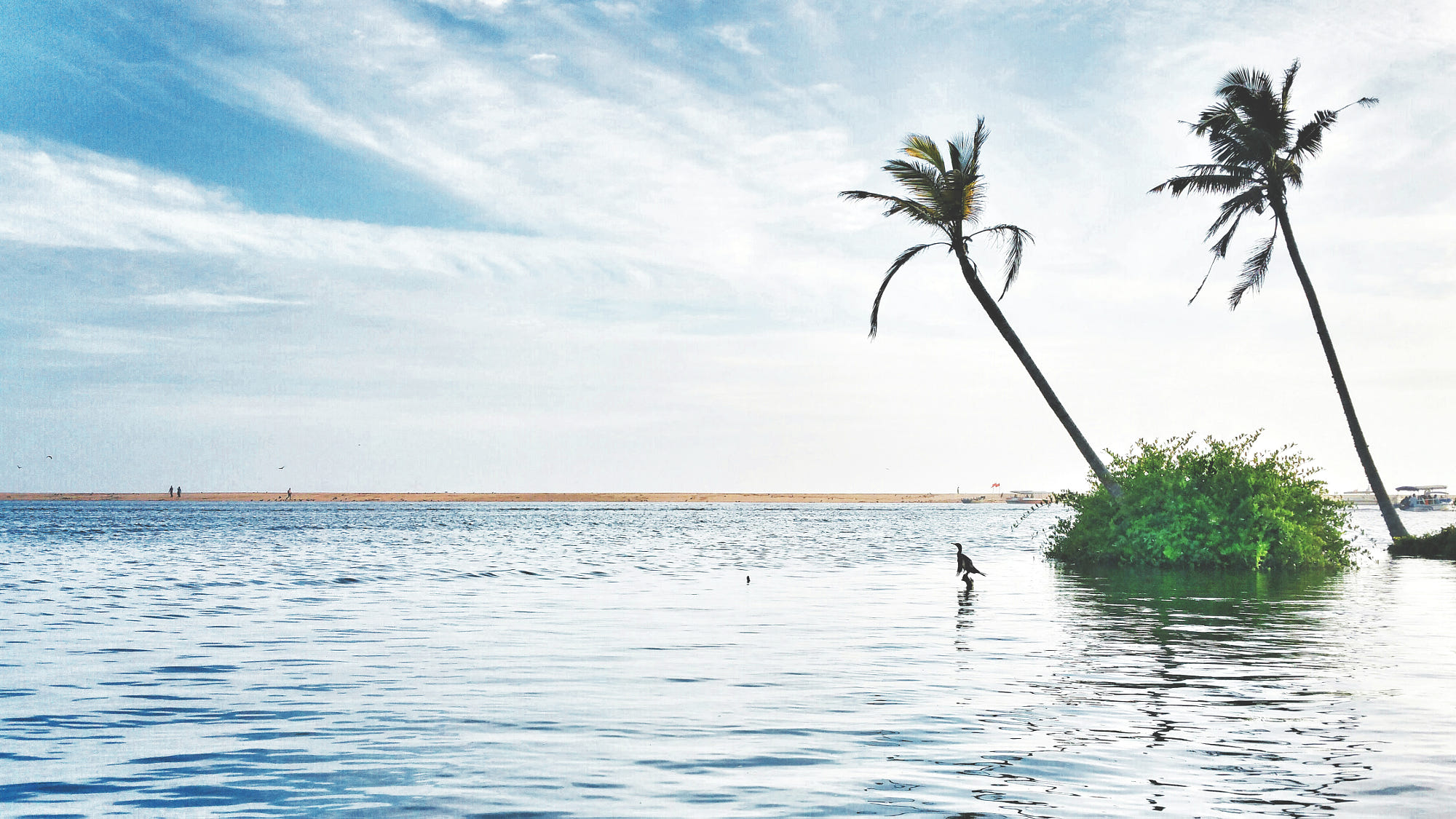
Poovar is often identified with Biblical Ophir.

Ophir, a region mentioned in the Bible, famous for its wealth, is often identified with some coastal areas of Kerala. According to legend, the King Solomon received a cargo from Ophir every three years (1 Kings 10:22) which consisted of gold, silver, sandalwood, pearls, ivory, apes, and peacocks. A Dictionary of the Bible by Sir William Smith, published in 1863, notes the Hebrew word for parrot Thukki, derived from the Classical Tamil for peacock Thogkai and Cingalese Tokei, joins other Classical Tamil words for ivory, cotton-cloth and apes preserved in the Hebrew Bible. This theory of Ophir's location in Tamilakam is further supported by other historians. The most likely location on the coast of Kerala conjectured to be Ophir is Poovar in Thiruvananthapuram District (though some Indian scholars also suggest Beypore as possible location). The Books of Kings and Chronicles tell of a joint expedition to Ophir by King Solomon and the Tyrian king Hiram I from Ezion-Geber, a port on the Red Sea, that brought back large amounts of gold, precious stones and 'algum wood' and of a later failed expedition by king Jehoshaphat of Judah. (Note: The first expedition is described in 1 Kings 9:28; 10:11; 1 Chronicles 29:4; 2 Chronicles 8:18; 9:10, the failed expedition of Jehoshaphat in 1 Kings 22:48) The famous 'gold of Ophir' is referenced in several other books of the Hebrew Bible. (Note: Book of Job 22:24; 28:16; Psalms 45:9; Isaiah 13:12)

=== Cheraman Perumal ===
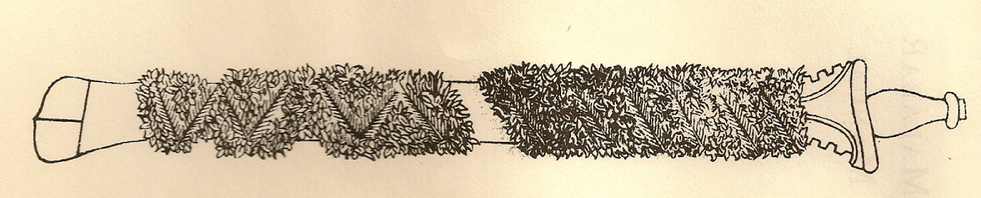
A portrait of the sword of the Zamorins of Kozhikode, related with the legend of Cheraman Perumals.

The legend of Cheraman Perumals is the medieval tradition associated with the Cheraman Perumal (literally the Chera kings) of Kerala. The Cheraman Perumals mentioned in the legend can be identified with the Chera Perumal rulers of medieval Kerala (c. 8th–12th century CE). The validity of the legend as a source of history once generated much debate among South Indian historians. The legend was used by Kerala chiefdoms for the legitimation of their rule (most of the major chiefly houses in medieval Kerala traced its origin back to the legendary allocation by the Perumal). According to the legend, Rayar, the overlord of the Cheraman Perumal in a country east of the Ghats, invaded Kerala during the rule of the last Perumal. To drive back the invading forces the Perumal summoned the militia of his chieftains (like Udaya Varman Kolathiri, Manichchan, and Vikkiran of Eranad). The Cheraman Perumal was assured by the Eradis (chief of Eranad) that they would take a fort established by the Rayar. The battle lasted for three days and the Rayar eventually evacuated his fort (and it was seized by the Perumal's troops). Then the last Cheraman Perumal divided Kerala or Chera kingdom among his chieftains and disappeared mysteriously. The Kerala people never more heard any tidings of him. The Eradis of Nediyiruppu, who later came to be known as the Zamorins of Kozhikode, who were left out in cold during allocation of the land, was granted the Cheraman Perumal's sword (with the permission to "die, and kill, and seize").

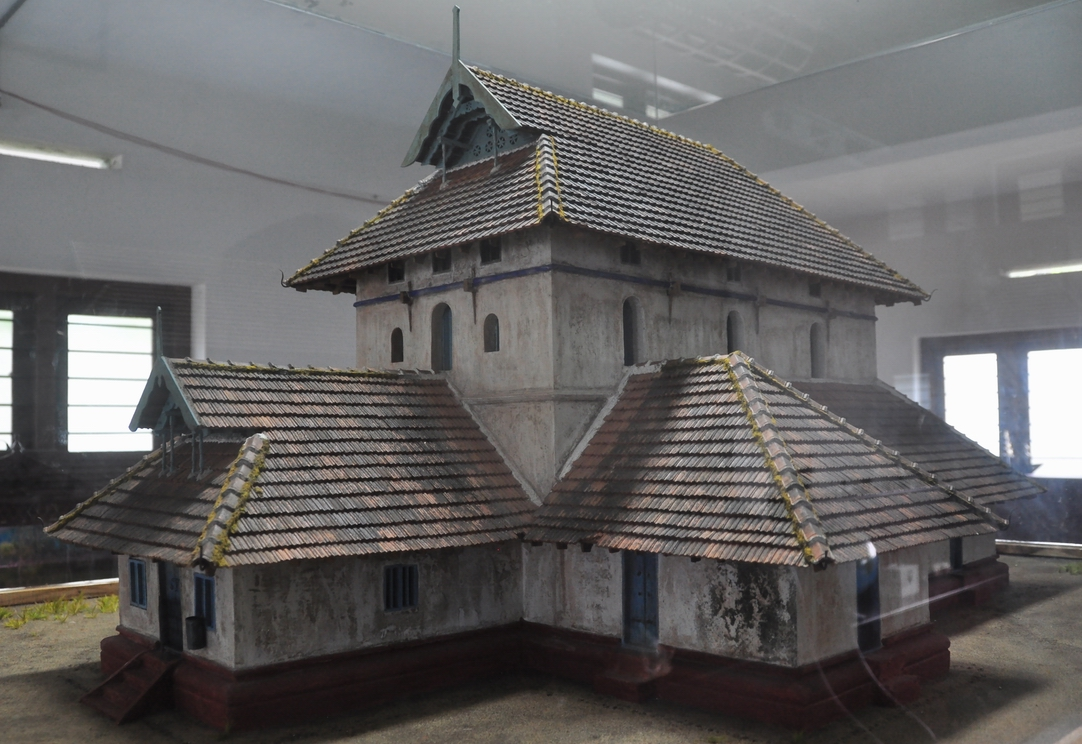
Structure of the old mosque

According to the Cheraman Juma Mosque and some other narratives, "Once a Cheraman Perumal probably named Ravi Varma was walking with his queen in the palace, when he witnessed the Splitting of the Moon. Shocked by this, he asked his astronomers to note down the exact time of the splitting. Then, when some Arab merchants visited his palace, he asked them about this incident. Their answers led the King to Mecca, where he met the Islamic prophet Muhammad and converted to Islam. Muhammad named him Tajuddin or Thajuddin or Thiya-aj-Addan meaning "crown of faith". The king then wrote letters to his kingdom to accept Islam and follow the teachings of Malik bin Deenar". It is assumed that the first recorded version of this legend is an Arabic manuscript of anonymous authorship known as Qissat Shakarwati Farmad. The 16th century Arabic work Tuhfat Ul Mujahideen authored by Zainuddin Makhdoom II of Ponnani, as well as the medieval Malayalam work Keralolpathi, also mention about the departure of last Cheraman Perumal of Kerala into Mecca.

== Prehistory ==
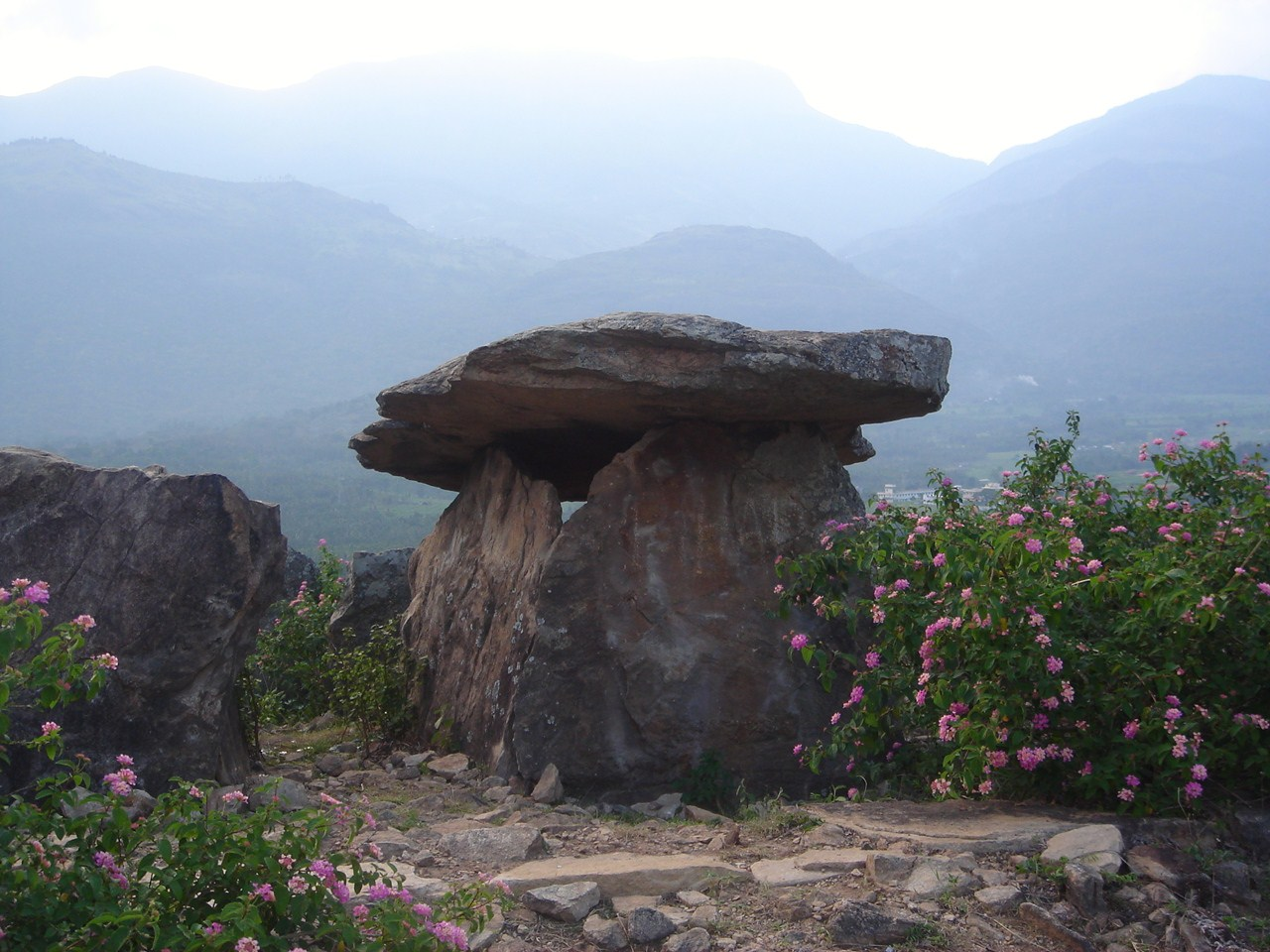
A dolmen erected by Neolithic people in Marayur, Kerala, India.

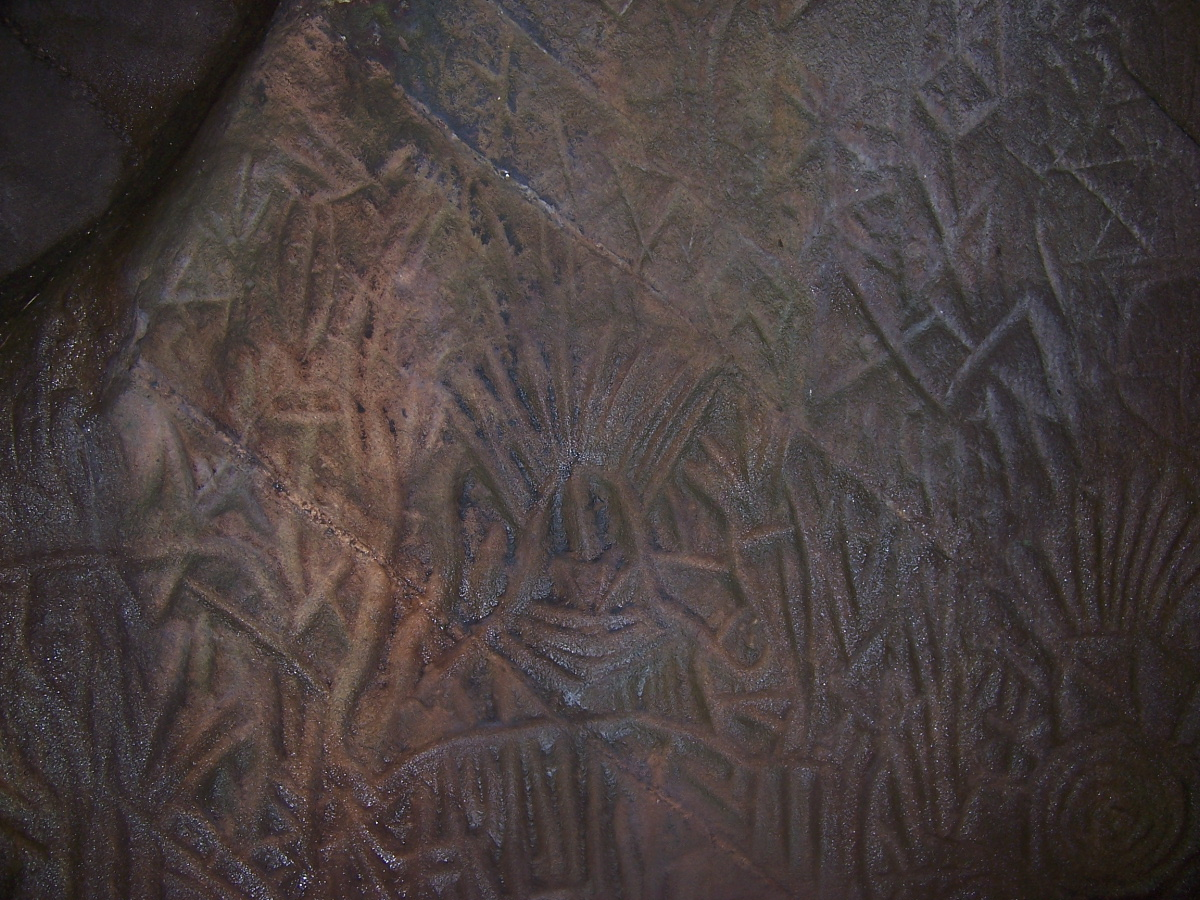
Stone Age (6,000 BCE) writings of Edakkal Caves in Kerala.

A substantial portion of Kerala including the western coastal lowland and the plains of midland may have been under the sea in ancient times. Marine fossils have been found in an area near Changanassery, thus supporting the hypothesis. Archaeological studies have identified many Mesolithic, Neolithic and Megalithic sites in the eastern highlands of Kerala mainly centred around the eastern mountain ranges of Western Ghats. Rock engravings in the Edakkal Caves, in Wayanad date back to the Neolithic era around 6000 BCE. These findings have been classified into Laterite rock-cut caves (Chenkallara), Hood stones (Kudakkallu), Hat stones (Toppikallu), Dolmenoid cists (Kalvrtham), Urn burials (Nannangadi) and Menhirs (Pulachikallu). The studies point to the indigenous development of the ancient Kerala society and its culture beginning from the Paleolithic age, and its continuity through Mesolithic, Neolithic and Megalithic ages. However, foreign cultural contacts have assisted this cultural formation. The studies suggest possible relationship with Indus Valley civilization during the late Bronze Age and early Iron Age.

Archaeological findings include dolmens of the Neolithic era in the Marayur area. They are locally known as "muniyara", derived from muni (hermit or sage) and ara (dolmen). Rock engravings in the Edakkal Caves in Wayanad are thought to date from the early to late Neolithic eras around 5000 BCE. Historian M. R. Raghava Varier of the Kerala state archaeology department identified a sign of "a man with jar cup" in the engravings, which is the most distinct motif of the Indus valley civilisation.

== Classical period ==
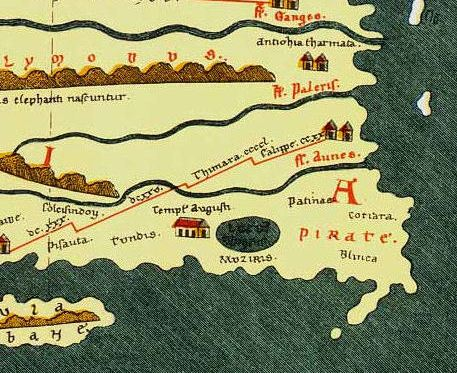
Muziris in the Tabula Peutingeriana, an itinerarium showing the road network in the Roman Empire.

=== Early ruling dynasties ===
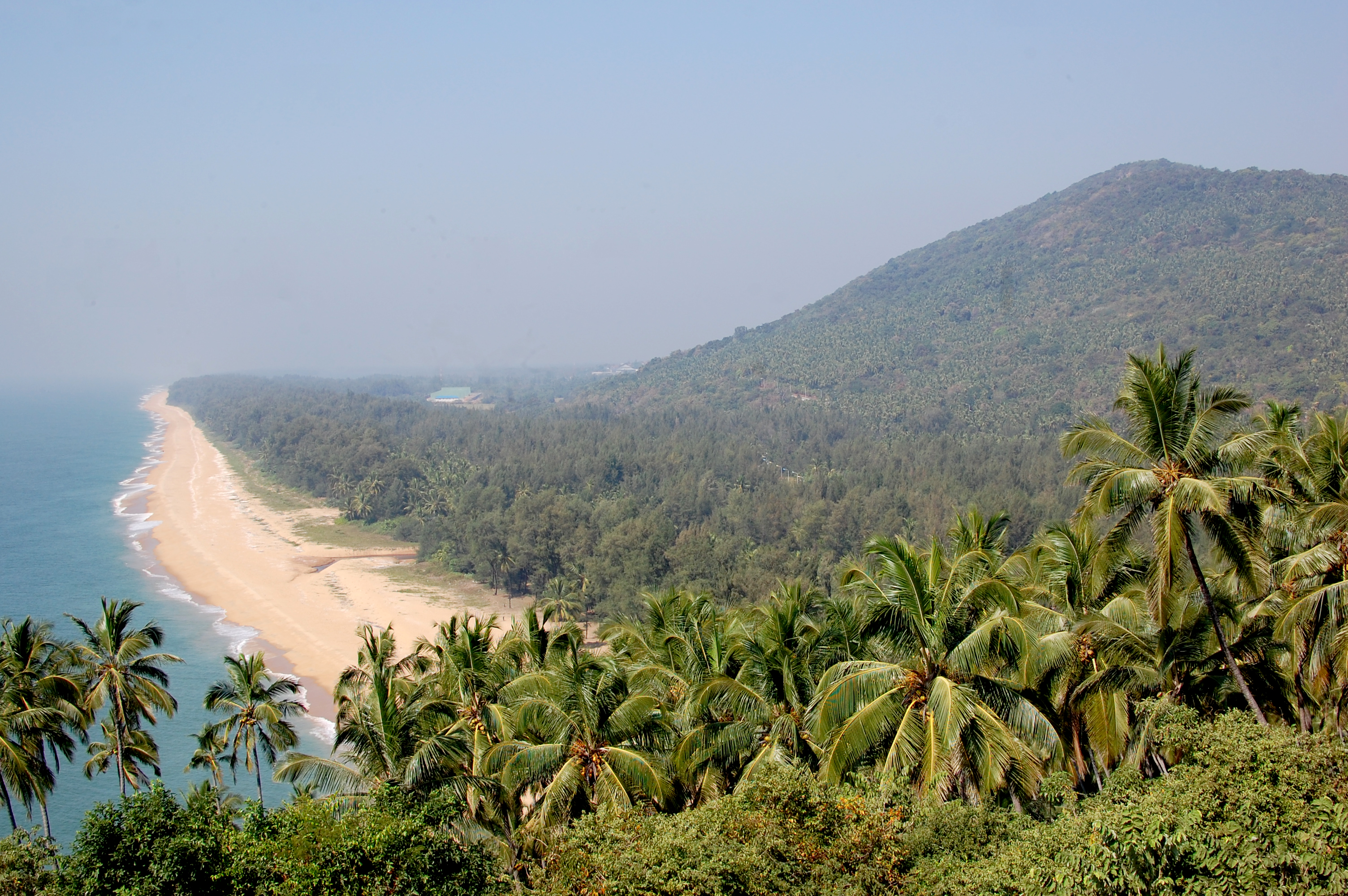
Ezhimala, the early historic headquarters of Mushika dynasty, which was succeeded by the kingdom of Kolathunadu later.

Kerala's dominant rulers of the early historic period were the Cheras, a Tamil dynasty with its headquarters located in Vanchi. The location of Vanchi is generally considered near the ancient port city of Muziris in Kerala. However, Karur in modern Tamil Nadu is also pointed out as the location of the capital city of Cheras. Another view suggests the reign of Cheras from multiple capitals. The Chera kingdom consisted of a major part of modern Kerala and Kongunadu which comprises western districts of modern Tamil Nadu like Coimbatore and Salem. The region around Coimbatore was ruled by the Cheras during Sangam period between c. 1st and the 4th centuries CE and it served as the eastern entrance to the Palakkad Gap, the principal trade route between the Malabar Coast and Tamil Nadu. Old Tamil works such as Patiṟṟuppattu, Patiṉeṇmēlkaṇakku and Silappatikaram are important sources that describe the Cheras from the early centuries CE. Together with the Cholas and Pandyas the Cheras formed the Tamil triumvirate of the mūvēntar (Three Crowned Kings). The Cheras ruled the western Malabar Coast, the Cholas ruled in the eastern Coromandel Coast and the Pandyas in the south-central peninsula. The Cheras were mentioned as Ketalaputo (Keralaputra) on an inscribed edict of emperor Ashoka of the Magadha Empire in the 3rd century BCE, as Cerobothra by the Greek Periplus of the Erythraean Sea and as Celebothras in the Roman encyclopedia Natural History by Pliny the Elder. The Mushika kingdom existed in northern Kerala, while the Ays ruled south of the Chera kingdom.

=== Trade relations ===
Names, routes and locations of the Periplus of the Erythraean Sea (1st century CE).

The region of Kerala was possibly engaged in trading activities from the 3rd millennium BCE with Arabs, Sumerians and Babylonians. Phoenicians, Greeks, Egyptians, Romans, and Chinese were attracted by a variety of commodities, especially spices and cotton fabrics. Arabs and Phoenicians were the first to enter Malabar Coast to trade Spices. The Arabs on the coasts of Yemen, Oman, and the Persian Gulf, must have made the first long voyage to Kerala and other eastern countries. They must have brought the Cinnamon of Kerala to the Middle East. The Greek historian Herodotus (5th century BCE) records that in his time the cinnamon spice industry was monopolized by the Egyptians and the Phoenicians.

Muziris, Tyndis, Naura, Berkarai, and Nelcynda were among the principal trading port centres of the Chera kingdom. Megasthanes, the Greek ambassador to the court of Magadhan king Chandragupta Maurya (4th century BCE) mentions Muziris and a Pandyan trade centre. Pliny mentions Muziris as India's first port of importance. According to him, Muziris could be reached in 40 days from the Red Sea ports of Egypt purely depending on the South west monsoon winds. Later, the unknown author of the Periplus of the Erythraean Sea notes that "both Muziris and Nelcynda are now busy places". There were harbours of Naura near Kannur, Tyndis near Kozhikode, and Barace near Alappuzha, which were also trading with Rome and Palakkad pass (churam) facilitated migration and trade. Tyndis was a major center of trade, next only to Muziris, between the Cheras and the Roman Empire. Roman establishments in the port cities of the region, such as a temple of Augustus and barracks for garrisoned Roman soldiers, are marked in the Tabula Peutingeriana; the only surviving map of the Roman cursus publicus. Pliny the Elder (1st century CE) states that the port of Tyndis was located at the northwestern border of Keprobotos (Chera dynasty). The North Malabar region, which lies north of the port at Tyndis, was ruled by the kingdom of Ezhimala during Sangam period. The port of Tyndis which was on the northern side of Muziris, as mentioned in Greco-Roman writings, was somewhere near Kozhikode. Its exact location is a matter of dispute. The suggested locations are Ponnani, Tanur, Beypore-Chaliyam-Kadalundi-Vallikkunnu, and Koyilandy.

According to the Periplus of the Erythraean Sea, a region known as Limyrike began at Naura and Tyndis. However the Ptolemy mentions only Tyndis as the Limyrike's starting point. The region probably ended at Kanyakumari; it thus roughly corresponds to the present-day Malabar Coast. The value of Rome's annual trade with the region was estimated at 50,000,000 sesterces. He also mentions that the region was prone to pirates. Cosmas Indicopleustes mentioned that it was also a source of Malabar peppers. Contemporary Tamil literature, Puṟanāṉūṟu and Akanaṉūṟu, speak of the Roman vessels and the Roman gold that used to come to the Kerala ports in search of Malabar pepper and other spices, which had enormous demand in the West. The contact with Middle East and Romans might have given rise to small colonies of Jews, Syrian Christians and Malabar Muslims in the chief harbour towns of Kerala.

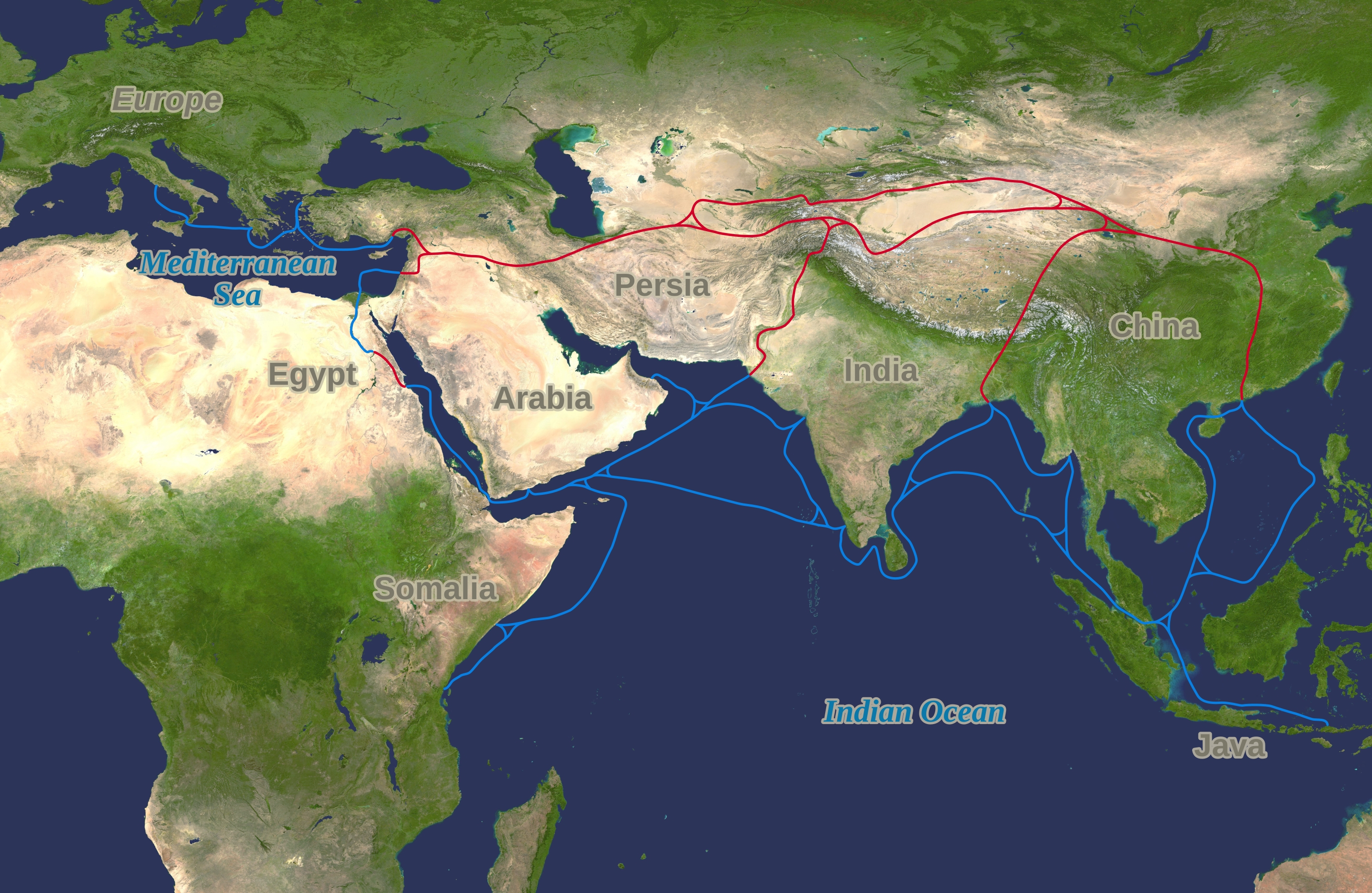
Silk Road map. The spice trade was mainly along the water routes (blue).

=== Formation of a multicultural society ===
Buddhism and Jainism reached Kerala in this early period. As in other parts of ancient India, Buddhism and Jainism co-existed with early Hindu beliefs during the first five centuries. Merchants from West Asia and Southern Europe established coastal posts and settlements in Kerala. Jews arrived in Kerala as early as 573 BCE. The Cochin Jews believe that their ancestors came to the west coast of India as refugees following the destruction of Jerusalem in the first century CE. Syrian Christians claim to be the descendants of the converts of Saint Thomas the Apostle of Jesus Christ. Arabs also had trade links with Kerala, starting before the 4th century BCE, as Herodotus (484–413 BCE) noted that goods brought by Arabs from Kerala were sold to the Jews at Eden. They intermarried with local people, resulting in the formation of the Muslim Mappila community. In the 4th century, the Knanaya Christians migrated from Persia and settled in southern Kodungallur. Mappila was an honorific title that had been assigned to respected visitors from abroad; and Jewish, Syrian Christian, and Muslim immigration might account for later names of the respective communities: Juda Mappilas, Muslim Mappilas, and Nasrani Mappilas. According to the legends of these communities, the earliest Christian churches, mosque, and synagogue (CE 1568) in India were built in Kerala. The combined number of Jews, Muslims, and Christians was relatively small at this early stage. They co-existed harmoniously with each other and with local Hindu society, aided by the commercial benefit from such association.

== Medieval and Early Modern periods ==
=== Political changes ===
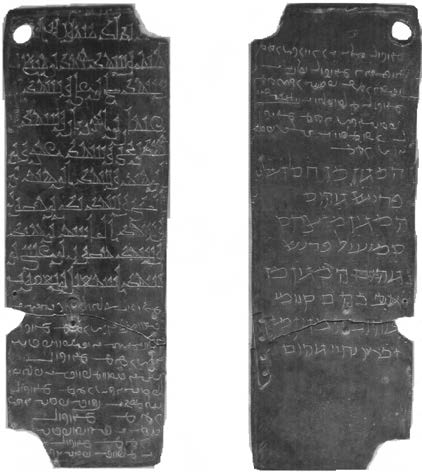
Quilon Syrian copper plates granted to Saint Thomas Christians. The sixth plate has signatures of witnesses to the grant in Arabic, Middle Persian and Judeo-Persian.

Much of history of the region from the 6th to the 8th century is obscure. From the Kodungallur line of the Cheras rose the Kulasekhara dynasty, which was established by Kulasekhara Varman. At its zenith these Later Cheras ruled over a territory comprising the whole of modern Kerala and a smaller part of modern Tamil Nadu. During the early part of Kulasekhara period, the southern region from Nagercoil to Thiruvananthapuram was ruled by Ay kings, who lost their power in the 10th century and thus the region became a part of the Cheras. Kerala witnessed a flourishing period of art, literature, trade and the Bhakti movement of Hinduism. A Keralite identity, distinct from the Tamils, became linguistically separate during this period. The origin of Malayalam calendar dates back to year 825 CE. For the local administration, the empire was divided into provinces under the rule of Nair Chieftains known as Naduvazhis, with each province comprising a number of Desams under the control of chieftains, called as Desavazhis. The era witnessed also a shift in political power, as Namboothiri Brahmins gained political power. As a result, many temples were constructed across Kerala, which according to M. T. Narayanan "became cornerstones of the socio-economic society". Mamankam festival, which was the largest native festival, was held at Tirunavaya near Kuttippuram, on the bank of river Bharathappuzha. Athavanad, the headquarters of Azhvanchery Thamprakkal, who were also considered as the supreme religious chief of the Nambudiri Brahmins of Kerala, is also located near Tirunavaya.

Sulaiman al-Tajir, a Persian merchant who visited Kerala during the reign of Sthanu Ravi Varma (9th century CE), records that there was extensive trade between Kerala and China at that time, based at the port of Kollam. A number of foreign accounts have mentioned about the presence of considerable Muslim population in the coastal towns. Arab writers such as Al-Masudi of Baghdad (896–956 CE), Muhammad al-Idrisi (1100–1165 CE), Abulfeda (1273–1331 CE), and Al-Dimashqi (1256–1327 CE) mention the Muslim communities in Kerala. Some historians assume that the Mappilas can be considered as the first native, settled Muslim community in South Asia.

The inhibitions, caused by a series of Chera-Chola wars in the 11th century, resulted in the decline of foreign trade in Kerala ports. In addition, Portuguese invasions in the 15th century caused two major religions, Buddhism and Jainism, to disappear from the land. It is known that the Menons in the Malabar region of Kerala were originally strong believers of Jainism. The social system became fractured with divisions on caste lines. The Kulasekhara dynasty was finally subjugated in 1102 by the combined attack of the Pandyas and Cholas. However, in the 14th century, Ravi Varma Kulashekhara (1299–1314) of the southern Venad kingdom was able to establish a short-lived supremacy over southern India. After his death, in the absence of strong central power, the state was fractured into about thirty small warring principalities under Nair Chieftains; the most powerful of them were the kingdom of Samuthiri in the north, Venad in the south and Kochi in the middle. The port at Kozhikode held the superior economic and political position in Kerala, while Kollam (Quilon), Kochi, and Kannur (Cannanore) were commercially confined to secondary roles.

=== The Rise of Advaita ===
Adi Shankara (CE 789), one of the greatest Indian philosophers, is believed to be born in Kaladi in Kerala, and consolidated the doctrine of advaita vedānta. Shankara travelled across the Indian subcontinent to propagate his philosophy through discourses and debates with other thinkers. He is reputed to have founded four mathas ("monasteries"), which helped in the historical development, revival and spread of Advaita Vedanta. Adi Shankara is believed to be the organiser of the Dashanami monastic order and the founder of the Shanmata tradition of worship.

His works in Sanskrit concern themselves with establishing the doctrine of advaita (nondualism). He also established the importance of monastic life as sanctioned in the Upanishads and Brahma Sutra, in a time when the Mimamsa school established strict ritualism and ridiculed monasticism. Shankara represented his works as elaborating on ideas found in the Upanishads, and he wrote copious commentaries on the Vedic canon (Brahma Sutra, principal upanishads and Bhagavad Gita) in support of his thesis. The main opponent in his work is the Mimamsa school of thought, though he also offers arguments against the views of some other schools like Samkhya and certain schools of Buddhism. His activities in Kerala was little and no evidence of his influence is noticed in the literature or other things in his lifetime in Kerala. Even though Sankara was against all caste systems, in later years his name was used extensively by the Brahmins of Kerala for establishing caste system in Kerala.

=== The Kingdom of Kozhikode ===
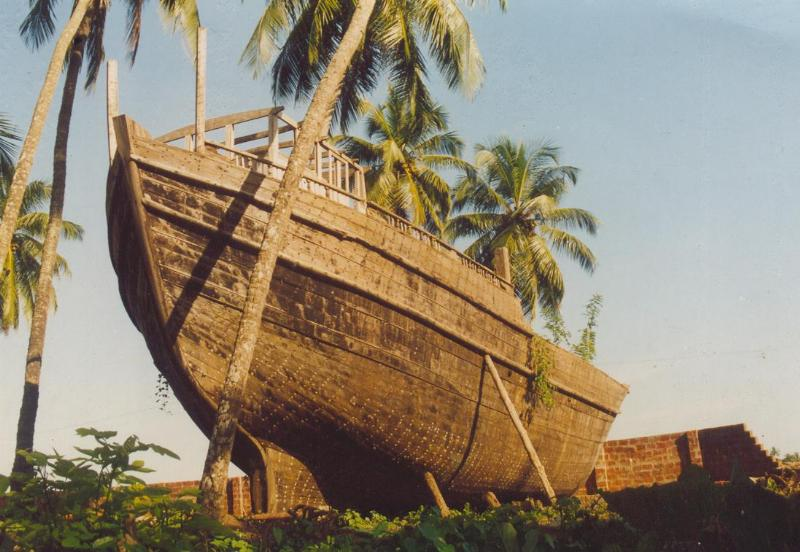
Uru, a type of ship that was historically used for maritime trade, built at Beypore, Kozhikode.

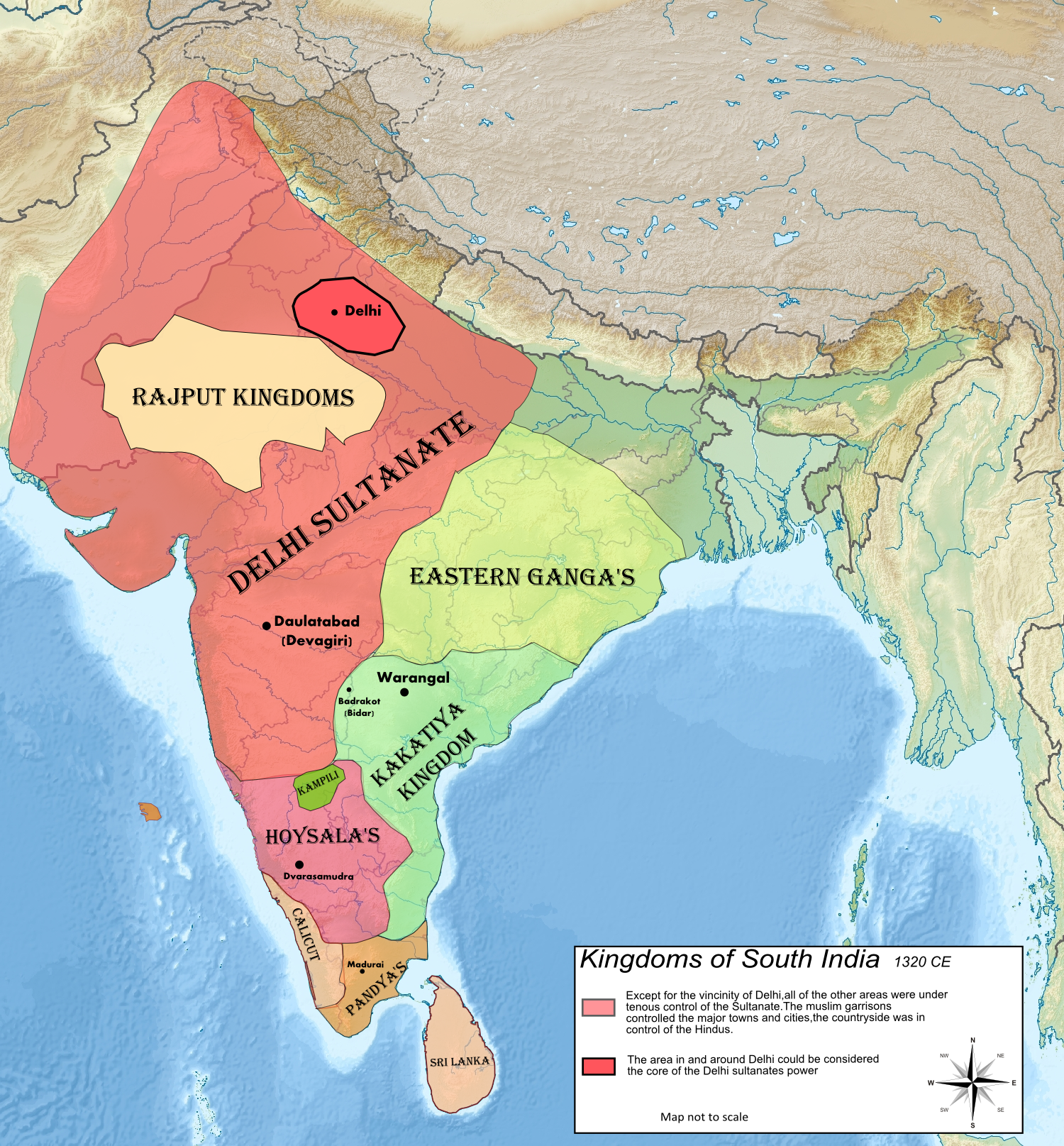
A political map of India in 1320 CE. Note that most of the present-day state of Kerala had been under the sovereignty of the Zamorin of Calicut.

Historical records regarding the origin of the Samoothiri of Kozhikode is obscure. However, its generally agreed that the Samoothiri were originally the Nair chieftains of Eralnadu region of the Later Chera Kingdom and were known as the Eradis. Eralnadu (Eranad) province was situated in the northern parts of present-day Malappuram district and was landlocked by the Valluvanad and Polanadu in the west. Legends such as Keralolpathi tell the establishment of a local ruling family at Nediyiruppu, near present-day Kondotty by two young brothers belonging to the Eradi clan. The brothers, Manikkan and Vikraman were the most trusted generals in the army of the Cheras. M.G.S. Narayanan, an Indian historian, in his book, Calicut: The City of Truth states that the Eradi was a favourite of the last Later Chera king and granted him, as a mark of favor, a small tract of land on the sea-coast in addition to his hereditary possessions (Eralnadu province). Eradis subsequently moved their capital to the coastal marshy lands and established the kingdom of Kozhikode (Note: To corroborate his assertion that Eradi was in fact a favourite of the last Later Chera, M.G.S. cites a stone inscription discovered at Kollam in southern Kerala. It refers to "Nalu Taliyum, Ayiram, Arunurruvarum, Eranadu Vazhkai Manavikiraman, mutalayulla Samathararum" – "The four Councillors, The Thousand, The Six Hundred, along with Mana Vikrama-the Governor of Eralnadu and other Feudatories." M.G.S. indicates that Kozhikode lay in fact beyond and not within the kingdom of Polanadu and there was no need of any kind of military movements for Kozhikode.) They later assumed the title of Samudrāthiri ("one who has the sea for his border") and continued to rule from Kozhikode.

Samoothiri allied with Muslim Arab and Chinese merchants and used most of the wealth from Kozhikode to develop his military power. They became the most powerful king in the Malayalam speaking regions during the Middle Ages. In the 14th century, Kozhikode conquered large parts of central Kerala following the seize of Tirunavaya from Valluvanad, which was under the control of the king of Perumbadappu Swaroopam. He was forced to shift his capital (c. CE 1405) further south from Kodungallur to Kochi. In the 15th century, Cochin was reduced in to a vassal state of Kozhikode. The ruler of Kolathunadu (Kannur) had also came under the influence of Zamorin by the end of the 15th century.

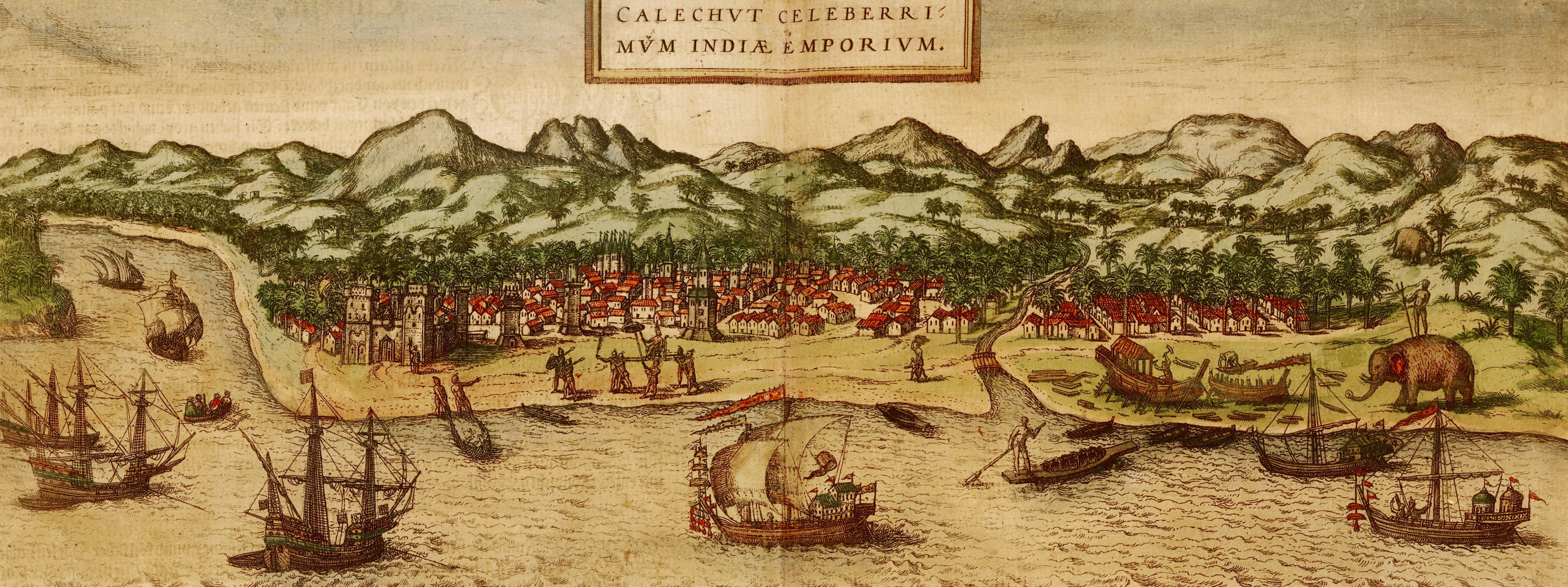
A panorama of port Kozhikode, shows several types of ships, shipbuilding, net fishing, dinghy traffic and a rugged, sparsely populated interior (Georg Braun and Frans Hogenberg's atlas Civitates orbis terrarum, 1572).

At the peak of their reign, the Zamorins of Kozhikode ruled over a region from Kollam (Quilon) in the south to Panthalayini Kollam (Koyilandy) in the north. Ibn Battuta (1342–1347), who visited the city of Kozhikode six times, gives the earliest glimpses of life in the city. He describes Kozhikode as "one of the great ports of the district of Malabar" where "merchants of all parts of the world are found". The king of this place, he says, "shaves his chin just as the Haidari Fakeers of Rome do... The greater part of the Muslim merchants of this place are so wealthy that one of them can purchase the whole freightage of such vessels put here and fit-out others like them". Ma Huan (1403 AD), the Chinese sailor part of the Imperial Chinese fleet under Cheng Ho (Zheng He) states the city as a great emporium of trade frequented by merchants from around the world. He makes note of the 20 or 30 mosques built to cater to the religious needs of the Muslims, the unique system of calculation by the merchants using their fingers and toes (followed to this day), and the matrilineal system of succession. Abdur Razzak (1442–43), Niccolò de' Conti (1445), Afanasy Nikitin (1468–74), Ludovico di Varthema (1503–1508), and Duarte Barbosa witnessed the city as one of the major trading centres in the Indian subcontinent where traders from different parts of the world could be seen.

==== Vijayanagara Empire Influences ====
The king Deva Raya II (1424–1446) of the Vijayanagara Empire tried to conquer the present-day state of Kerala in the 15th century but was not able to logistically do so. He however accepted the rule of the Zamorin of Kozhikode, as well as the ruler of Kollam around on 1443. Fernão Nunes says that the Zamorin had to pay tribute to the king of Vijayanagara Empire. As the Vijayanagara power diminished over the next fifty years, the Zamorin of Kozhikode again rose to prominence in Kerala. He built a fort at Ponnani in 1498.

=== The Kingdom of Venad ===
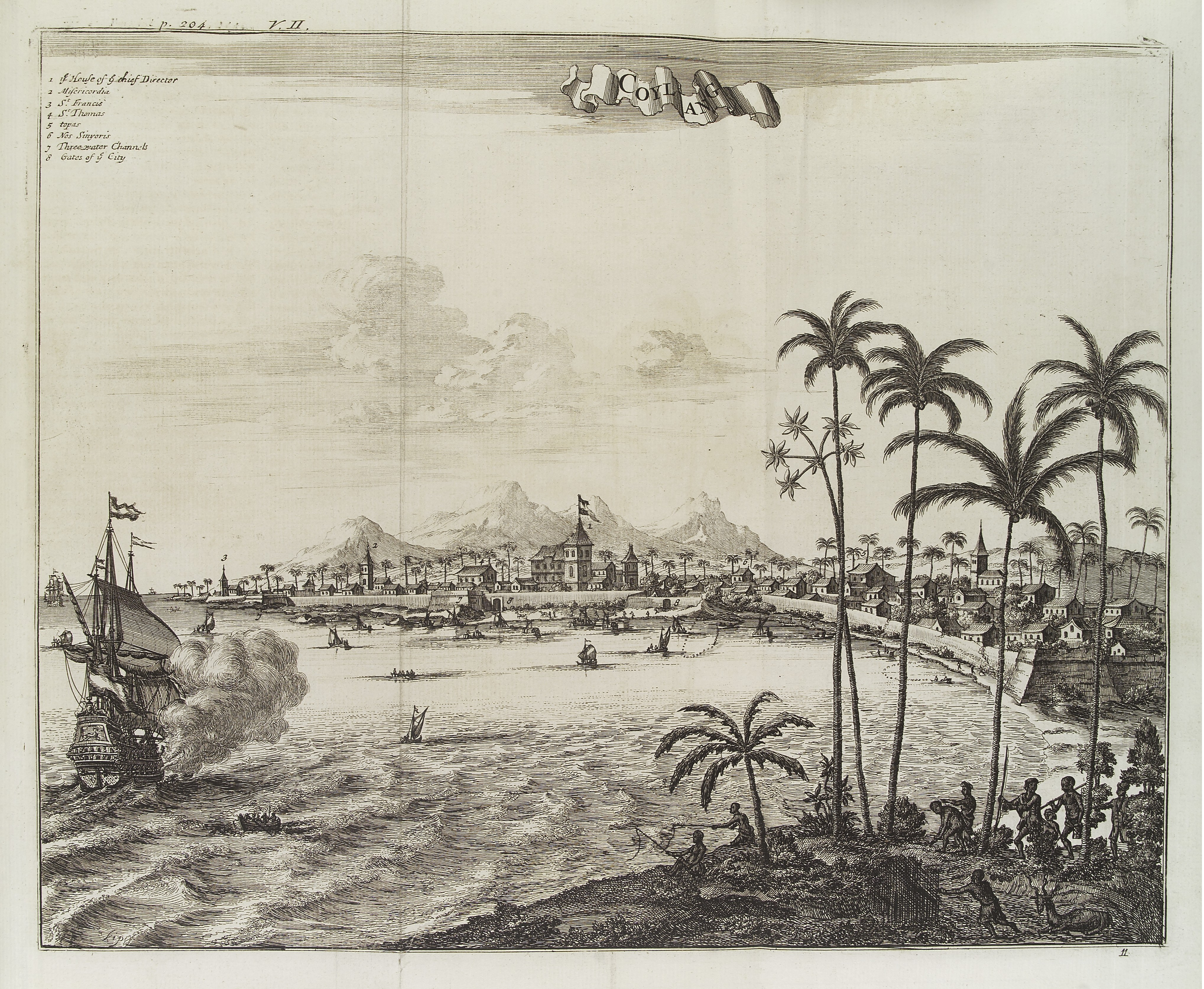
Kollam, the capital of Venad, in the 1700s.

Venad was a kingdom in the south west tip of Kerala, which acted as a buffer between Cheras and Pandyas. Until the end of the 11th century, it was a small principality in the Ay Kingdom. The Ays were the earliest ruling dynasty in southern Kerala, who, at their zenith, ruled over a region from Nagercoil in the south to Thiruvananthapuram in the north. Their capital was at Kollam. A series of attacks by the Pandyas between the 7th and 8th centuries caused the decline of Ays although the dynasty remained powerful until the beginning of the 10th century. When Ay power diminished, Venad became the southernmost principality of the Second Chera Kingdom Invasion of Cholas into Venad caused the destruction of Kollam in 1096. However, the Chera capital, Mahodayapuram, fell in the subsequent attack, which compelled the Chera king, Rama varma Kulasekara, to shift his capital to Kollam. Thus, Rama Varma Kulasekara, the last king of Chera dynasty, is probably the founder of the Venad royal house, and the title of Chera kings - Kulasekara, was thenceforth adopted by the rulers of Venad. The end of Second Chera dynasty in the 12th century marks the independence of the Venad. The Venadu King then also was known as Venadu Mooppil Nayar.

In the second half of the 12th century, two branches of the Ay Dynasty: Thrippappur and Chirava, merged into the Venad family and established the tradition of designating the ruler of Venad as Chirava Moopan and the heir-apparent as Thrippappur Moopan. While Chrirava Moopan had his residence at Kollam, the Thrippappur Moopan resided at his palace in Thrippappur, 9 miles (14 km) north of Thiruvananthapuram, and was vested with the authority over the temples of Venad kingdom, especially the Sri Padmanabhaswamy temple.

==== The Legacy of Venad ====
The most powerful kingdom of Kerala during the era of European influences, Travancore, was developed through the expansion of Venad by Mahahrajah Marthanda Varma, a member of the Thrippappur branch of the Ay Dynasty who ascended to the throne in the early 18th century.

=== The Kingdom of Kolathunadu ===
The ancient kingdom of Ezhimala had jurisdiction over the North Malabar which consisted of two Nadus (regions)- The coastal Poozhinadu and the hilly eastern Karkanadu. According to the works of Sangam literature, Poozhinadu consisted much of the coastal belt between Mangalore and Kozhikode. Karkanadu consisted of Wayanad-Gudalur hilly region with parts of Kodagu (Coorg). It is said that Nannan, the most renowned ruler of Ezhimala dynasty, took refuge at Wayanad hills in the 5th century CE when he was lost to Cheras, just before his execution in a battle, according to the Sangam works. Ezhimala kingdom was succeeded by Mushika dynasty in the early medieval period, most possibly due to the migration of Tuluva Brahmins from Tulu Nadu. The Mushika-vamsha Mahakavya, written by Athula in the 11th century, throws light on the recorded past of the Mushika Royal Family up until that point. The Indian anthropologist Ayinapalli Aiyappan states that a powerful and warlike clan of the Bunt community of Tulu Nadu was called Kola Bari and the Kolathiri Raja of Kolathunadu was a descendant of this clan.

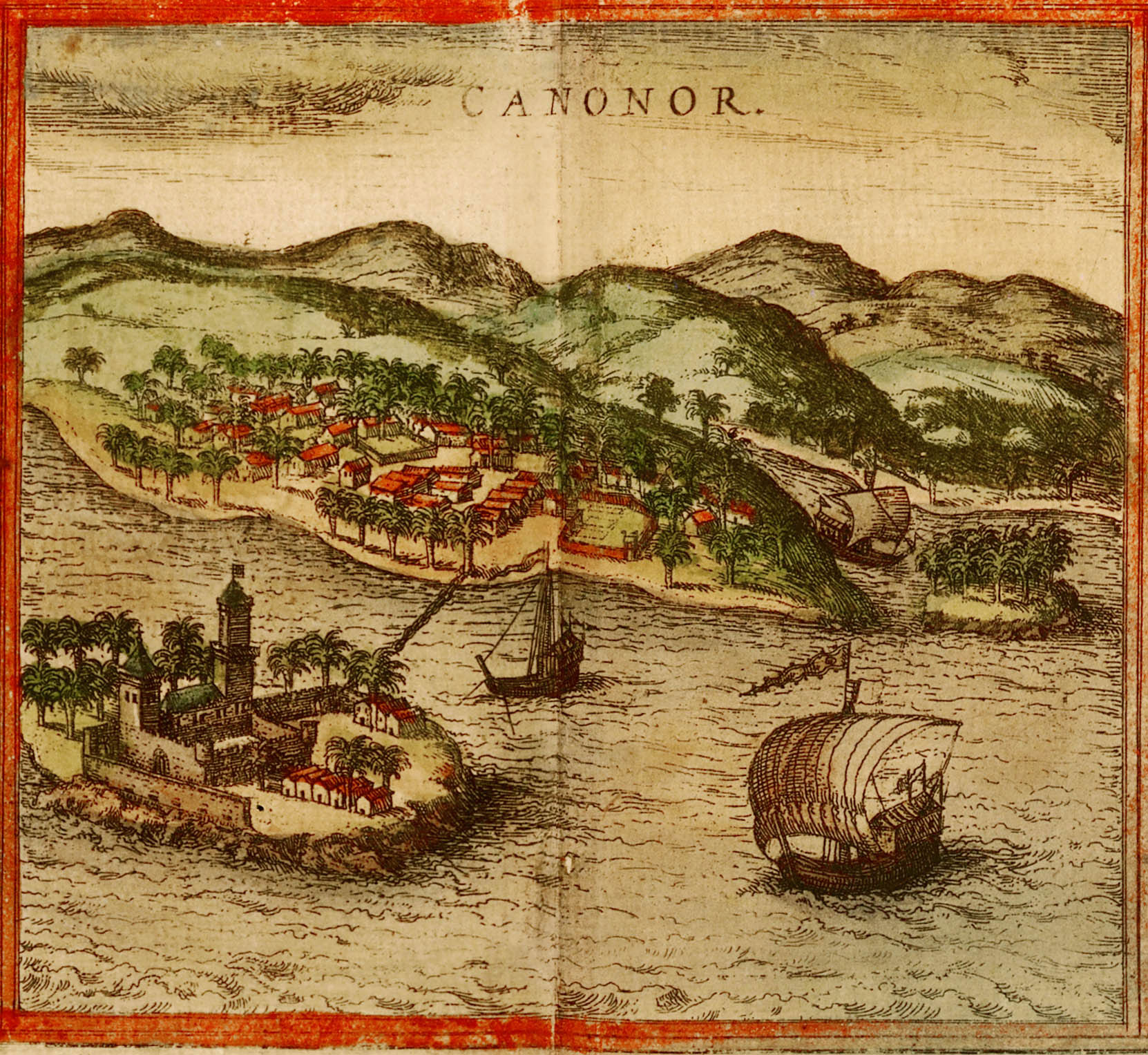
A portrait of Kannur, the largest city of North Malabar, drawn in 1572, from Georg Braun and Frans Hogenberg's atlas Civitates orbis terrarum, Volume I.

The kingdom of Kolathunadu, who were the descendants of Mushika dynasty, at the peak of its power reportedly extended from Netravati River (Mangalore) in the north to Korapuzha (Kozhikode) in the south with Arabian Sea on the west and Kodagu hills on the eastern boundary, also including the isolated islands of Lakshadweep in Arabian Sea. An Old Malayalam inscription (Ramanthali inscriptions), dated to 1075 CE, mentioning king Kunda Alupa, the ruler of Alupa dynasty of Mangalore, can be found at Ezhimala near Kannur. The Arabic inscription on a copper slab within the Madayi Mosque in Kannur records its foundation year as 1124 CE. In his book on travels (Il Milione), Marco Polo recounts his visit to the area in the mid 1290s. Other visitors included Faxian, the Buddhist pilgrim and Ibn Batuta, writer and historian of Tangiers. The Kolathunadu in the late medieval period emerged into independent 10 principalities i.e., Kadathanadu (Vadakara), Randathara or Poyanad (Dharmadom), Kottayam (Thalassery), Nileshwaram, Iruvazhinadu (Panoor), Kurumbranad etc., under separate royal chieftains due to the outcome of internal dissensions. The Nileshwaram dynasty on the northernmost part of Kolathiri dominion, were relatives to both Kolathunadu as well as the Zamorin of Calicut, in the early medieval period. The kingdom of Kumbla in the northernmost region of the modern state of Kerala, who had jurisdiction over the Taluks of Manjeshwar and Kasaragod, and parts of Mangalore in Southern Tulu Nadu, were also vassals to the kingdom of Kolathunadu until the Carnatic conquests of the 15th century CE.

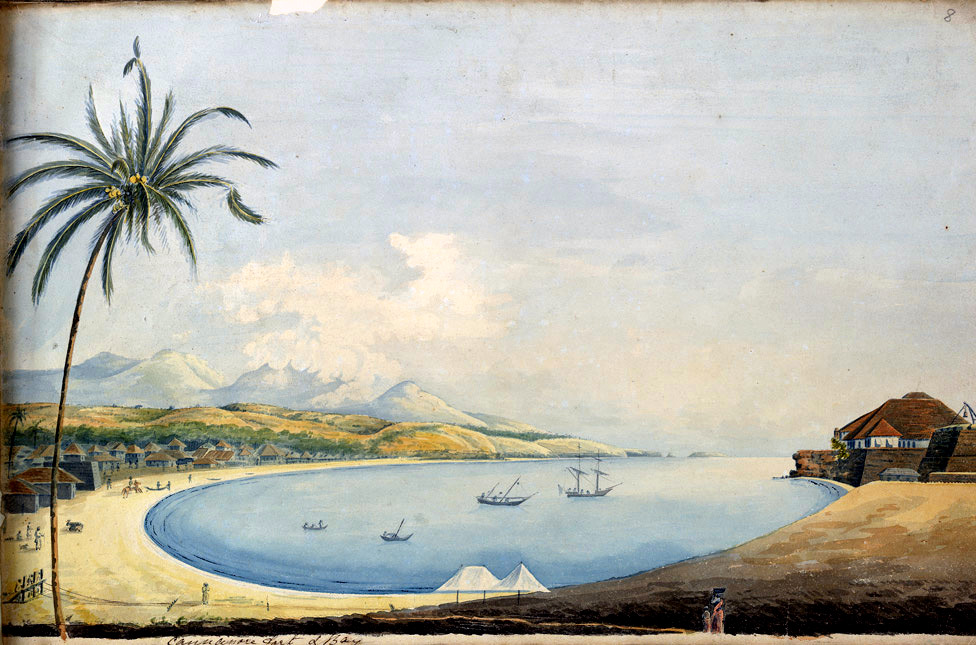
Kannur fort and Bay; a watercolor by John Johnston (1795–1801).

According to Kerala Muslim tradition, the North Malabar region was also home to several oldest mosques in the Indian subcontinent. According to the Legend of Cheraman Perumals, the first Indian mosque was built in 624 CE at Kodungallur with the mandate of the last the ruler (the Cheraman Perumal) of Chera dynasty, who left from Dharmadom near Kannur to Mecca and converted to Islam during the lifetime of Muhammad (c. 570–632). According to Qissat Shakarwati Farmad, the Masjids at Kodungallur, Kollam, Madayi, Barkur, Mangalore, Kasaragod, Kannur, Dharmadam, Panthalayani, and Chaliyam, were built during the era of Malik Dinar, and they are among the oldest Masjids in the Indian subcontinent. It is believed that Malik Dinar died at Thalangara in Kasaragod town. The Koyilandy Jumu'ah Mosque in the erstwhile Kolathunadu contains an Old Malayalam inscription written in a mixture of Vatteluttu and Grantha scripts which dates back to the 10th century CE. It is a rare surviving document recording patronage by a Hindu king (Bhaskara Ravi) to the Muslims of Kerala.

== The Kerala school of astronomy and mathematics ==
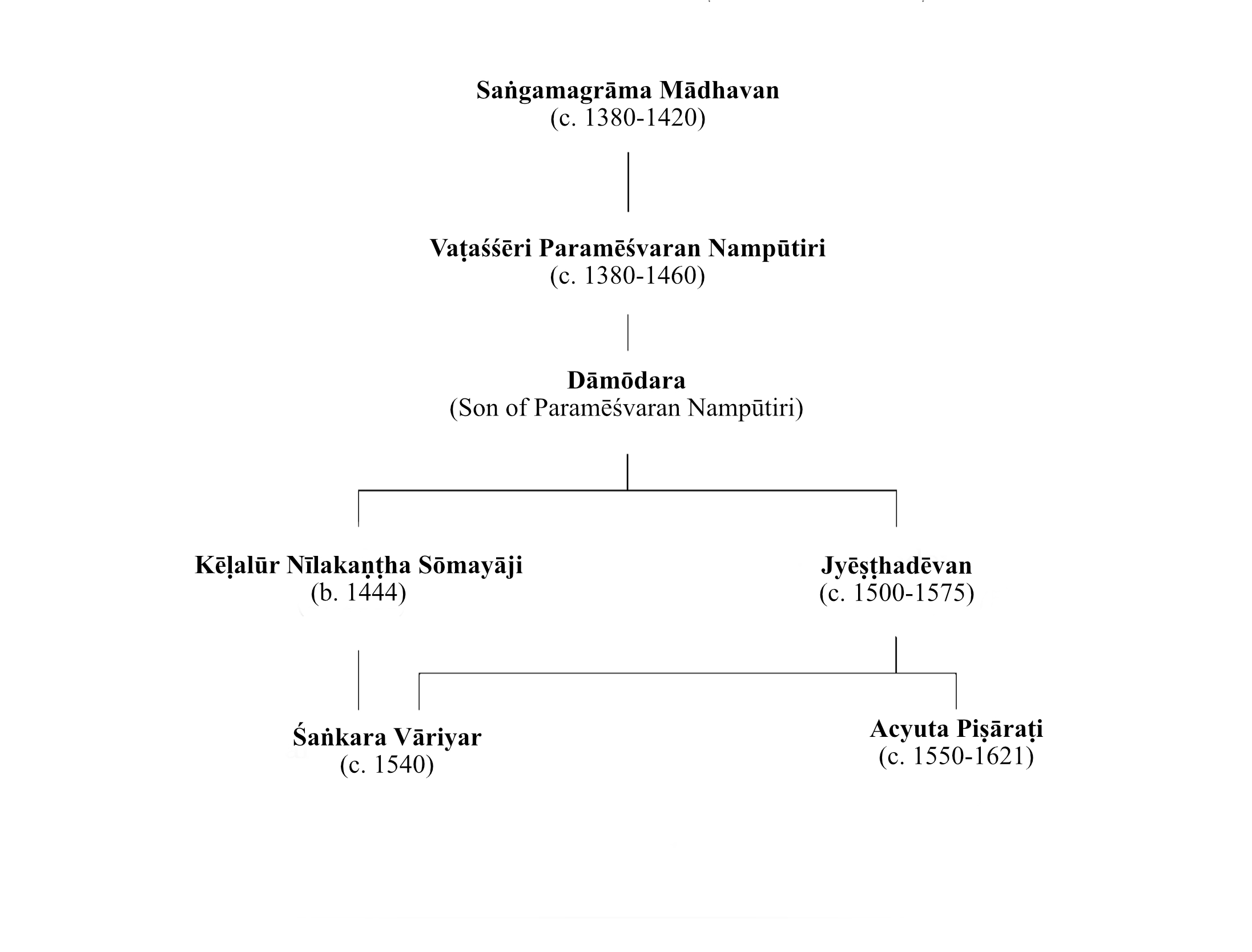
The list of teachers at the Kerala school of astronomy and mathematics

The Kerala school of astronomy and mathematics was a school of mathematics and astronomy founded by Madhava of Sangamagrama in Tirur in the 14th century. Among its members were Parameshvara, Neelakanta Somayaji, Jyeshtadeva, Achyuta Pisharati, Melpathur Narayana Bhattathiri and Achyuta Panikkar. Some of the contributions of the school included the discovery of the infinite series and taylor series of some trigonometry functions. The school flourished between the 14th and 16th centuries.

== European trade and influences ==
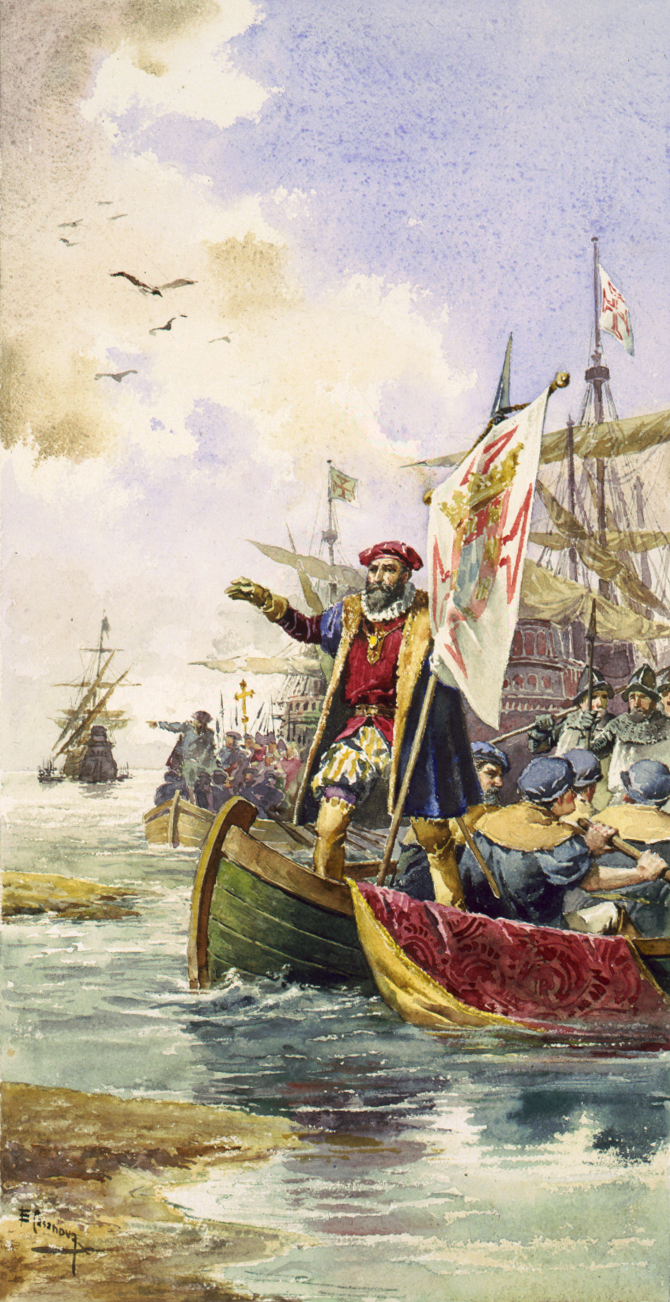
Vasco da Gama landing in Kerala.

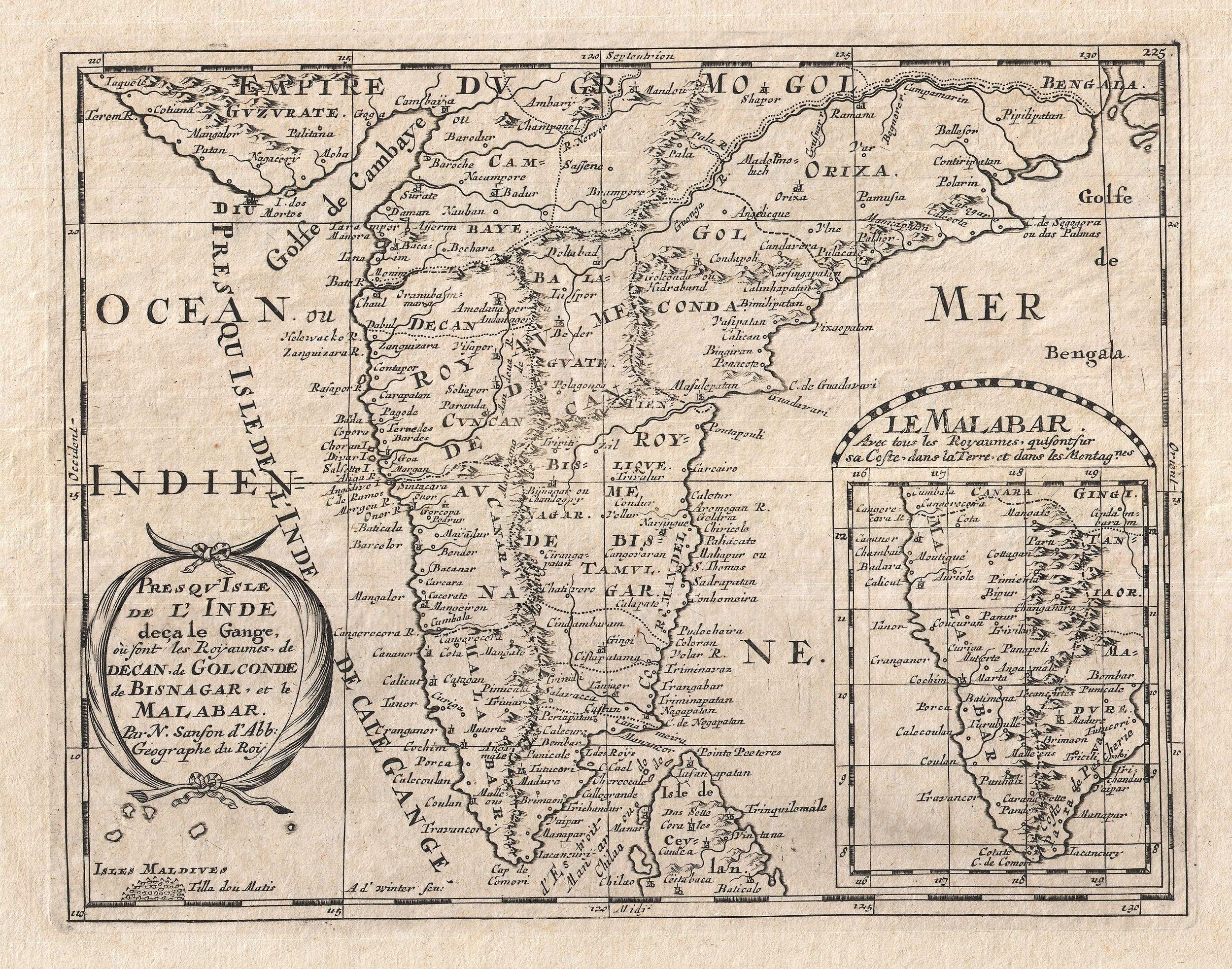
A 1652 Map of India (Malabar Coast is highlighted separately on the right side).

The maritime spice trade monopoly in the Indian Ocean stayed with the Arabs during the High and Late Middle Ages. However, the dominance of Middle East traders was challenged in the European Age of Discovery. After Vasco Da Gama's arrival in Kappad Kozhikode in 1498, the Portuguese began to dominate eastern shipping, and the spice-trade in particular. Following the discovery of sea route from Europe to Malabar in 1498, the Portuguese began to expand their influence between Ormus and the Malabar Coast and south to Ceylon.

=== Portuguese trade and influences ===
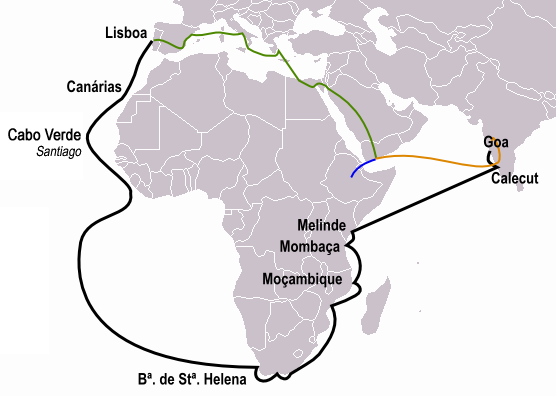
The path Vasco da Gama took to reach Kozhikode (black line).

Vasco da Gama was sent by the King of Portugal Dom Manuel I and landed at Kozhikode in 1497–1499. The Samoothiri Maharaja of Kozhikode permitted the Portuguese to trade with his subjects. Their trade in Kozhikode prospered with the establishment of a factory and fort in his territory. However, Portuguese attacks on Arab properties in his jurisdiction provoked the Samoothiri and finally led to conflict. The ruler of the Kingdom of Tanur, who was a vassal to the Zamorin of Calicut, sided with the Portuguese, against his overlord at Kozhikode. As a result, the Kingdom of Tanur (Vettathunadu) became one of the earliest Portuguese Colonies in India. The ruler of Tanur also sided with Cochin. Many of the members of the royal family of Cochin in 16th and 17th centuries were selected from Vettom. However, the Tanur forces under the king fought for the Zamorin of Calicut in the Battle of Cochin (1504). However, the allegiance of the Mappila merchants in Tanur region still stayed under the Zamorin of Calicut.

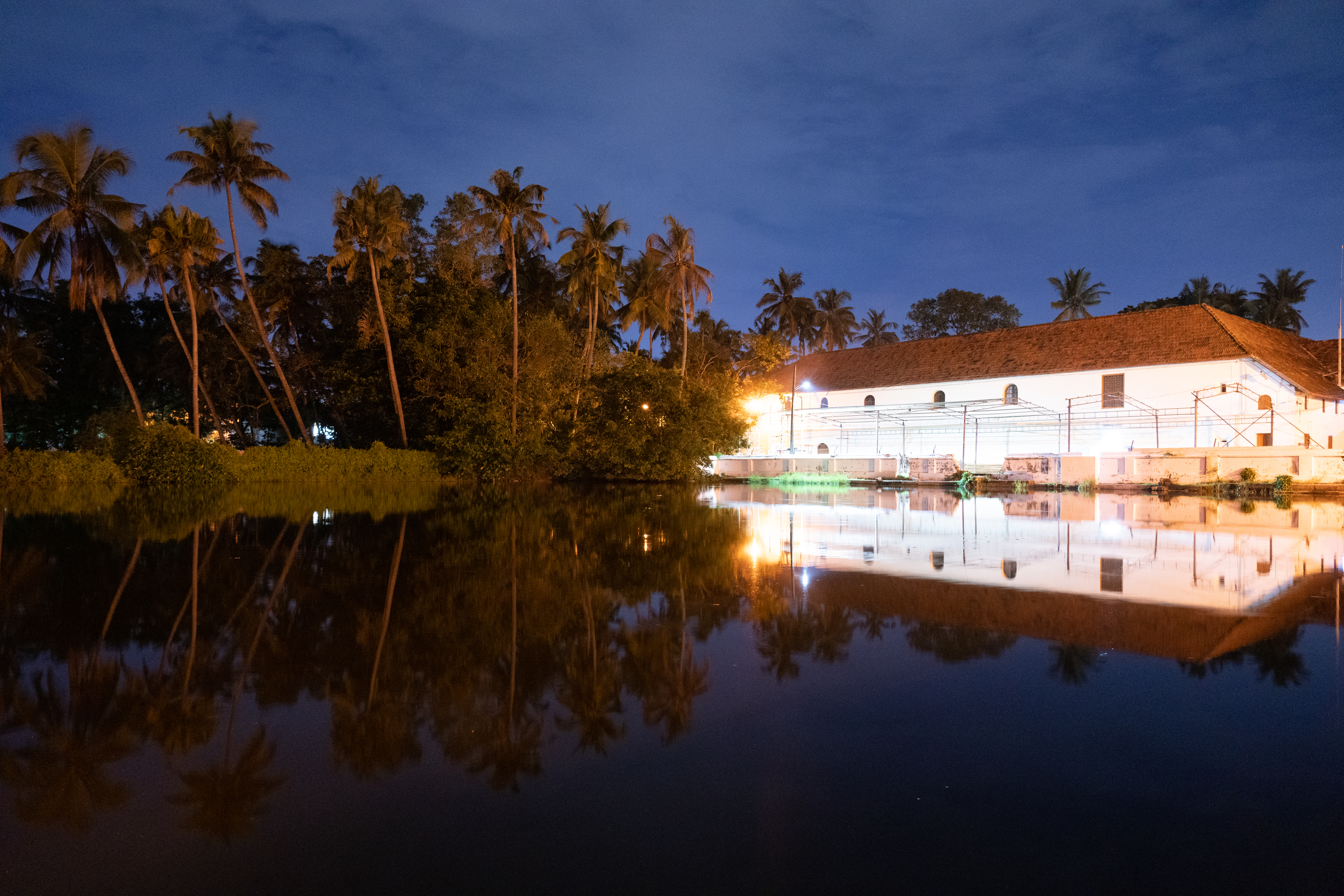
The Mattancherry Palace at Kochi was built and gifted by the Portuguese as a present to the Kingdom of Cochin around 1545.

The Portuguese took advantage of the rivalry between the Samoothiri and Rajah of Kochi – they allied with Kochi and when Francisco de Almeida was appointed Viceroy of Portuguese India in 1505, he established his headquarters at Kochi. During his reign, the Portuguese managed to dominate relations with Kochi and established a number of fortresses along the Malabar Coast. Nonetheless, the Portuguese suffered severe setbacks due to attacks by Samoothiri Maharaja's forces, especially naval attacks under the leadership of admirals of Kozhikode known as Kunjali Marakkars, which compelled them to seek a treaty. The Kunjali Marakkars are credited with organizing the first naval defense of the Indian coast. Tuhfat Ul Mujahideen written by Zainuddin Makhdoom II (born around 1532) of Ponnani in 16th-century CE is the first-ever known book fully based on the history of Kerala, written by a Keralite. It is written in Arabic and contains pieces of information about the resistance put up by the navy of Kunjali Marakkar alongside the Zamorin of Calicut from 1498 to 1583 against Portuguese attempts to colonize Malabar coast. Thunchaththu Ezhuthachan, who is considered as the father of modern Malayalam literature, was born at Tirur (Vettathunadu) during Portuguese period. The medieval Kerala school of astronomy and mathematics that flourished between the 14th and 16th centuries, was also primarily based in Vettathunadu (Tirur region)

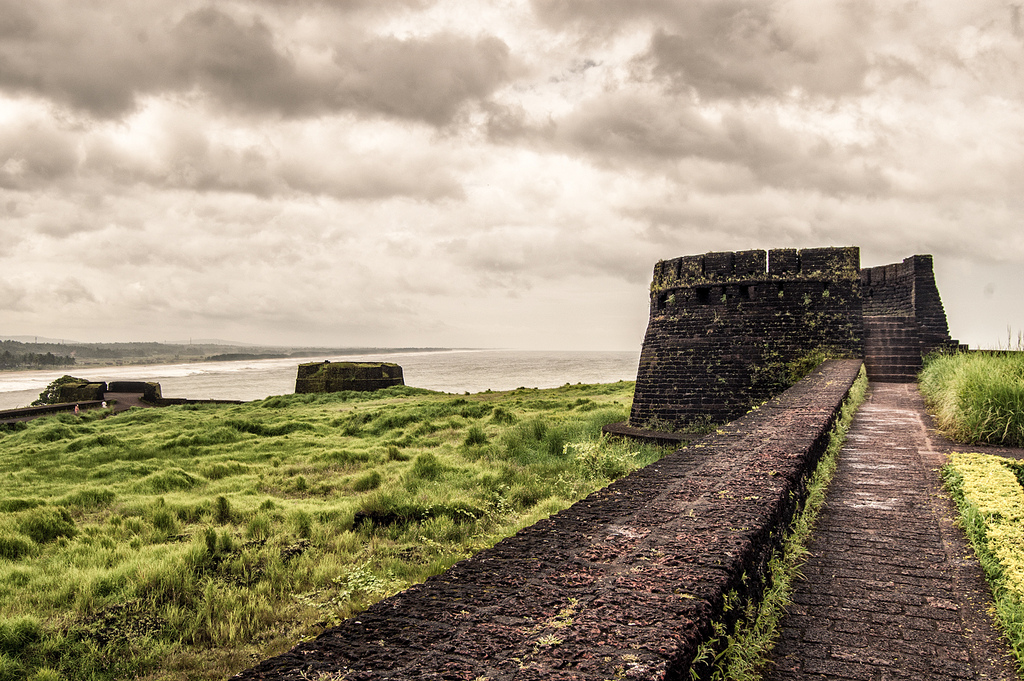
Bekal Fort at Kasaragod built in 1650 CE by Shivappa Nayaka.

The St. Angelo Fort at Kannur was built by the Portuguese in 1505, which was later captured by Dutch and Arakkal kingdom. The Portuguese Cemetery, Kollam (after the invasion of Dutch, it became Dutch Cemetery) of Tangasseri in Kollam city was constructed in around 1519 as part of the Portuguese invasion in the city. Buckingham Canal (a small canal between Tangasseri Lighthouse and the cemetery) is situated very close to the Portuguese Cemetery. A group of pirates known as the Pirates of Tangasseri formerly lived at the Cemetery. The remnants of St. Thomas Fort and Portuguese Cemetery still exist at Tangasseri. The Muslim line of Ali Rajas of Arakkal kingdom, near Kannur, who were the vassals of the Kolathiri, ruled over the Lakshadweep islands. The Bekal Fort near Kasaragod, which is also largest fort in the state, was built in 1650 by Shivappa Nayaka of Keladi.

=== French port in Kerala - Mahe ===
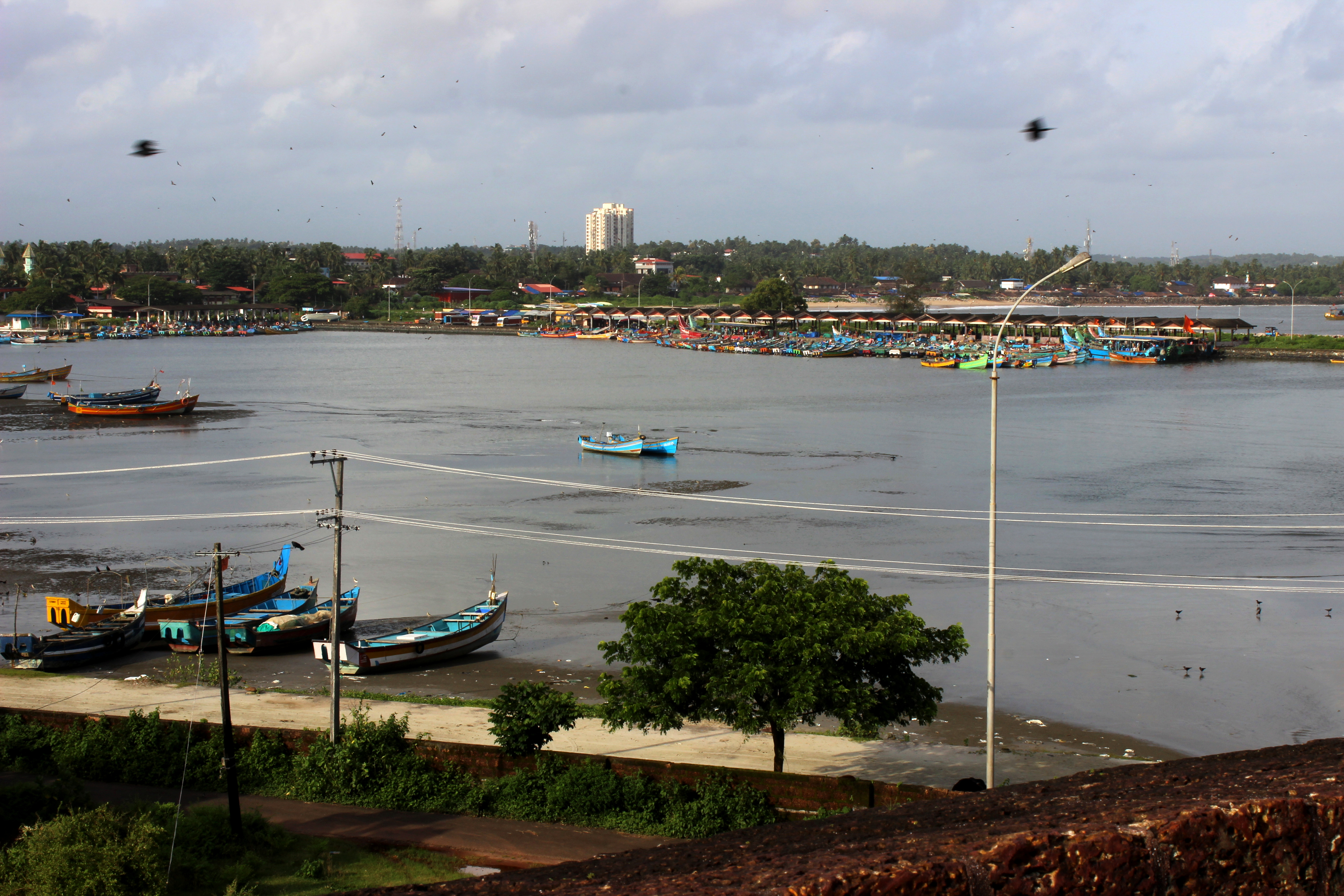
Mappila Bay harbour at Ayikkara, Kannur. On one side, there is St. Angelo Fort (built in 1505) and on the other side is Arakkal palace.

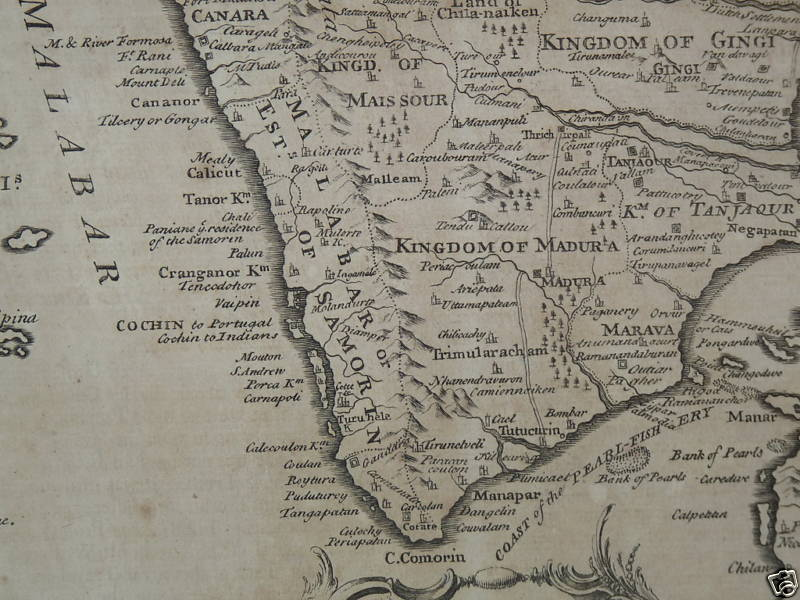
A 1744 map of Malabar Coast (Malabar coast is on the left side).

The French East India Company constructed a fort on the site of Mahé in 1724, in accordance with an accord concluded between André Mollandin and Raja Vazhunnavar of Badagara three years earlier. In 1741, Mahé de La Bourdonnais retook the town after a period of occupation by the Marathas.

In 1761 the British captured Mahé, India, and the settlement was handed over to the Rajah of Kadathanadu. The British restored Mahé, India to the French as a part of the 1763 Treaty of Paris. In 1779, the Anglo-French war broke out, resulting in the French loss of Mahé, India. In 1783, the British agreed to restore to the French their settlements in India, and Mahé, India was handed over to the French in 1785.

=== Dutch trade and influences ===
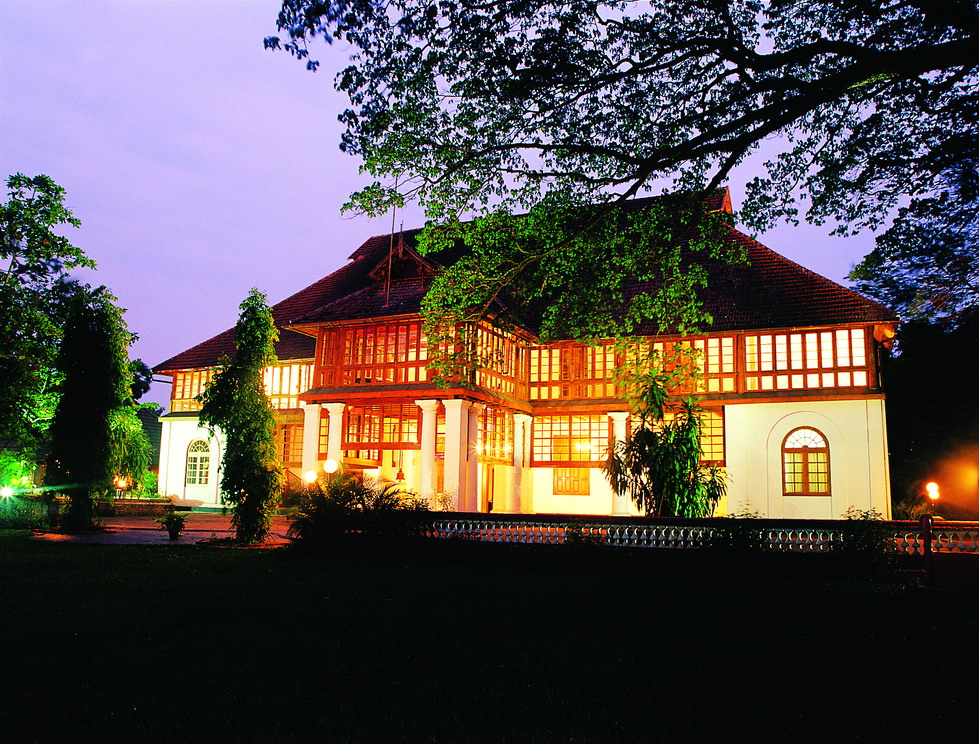
Bolgatty Palace, built in 1744 by Dutch Malabar, also acted as the British Residency in Kochi.

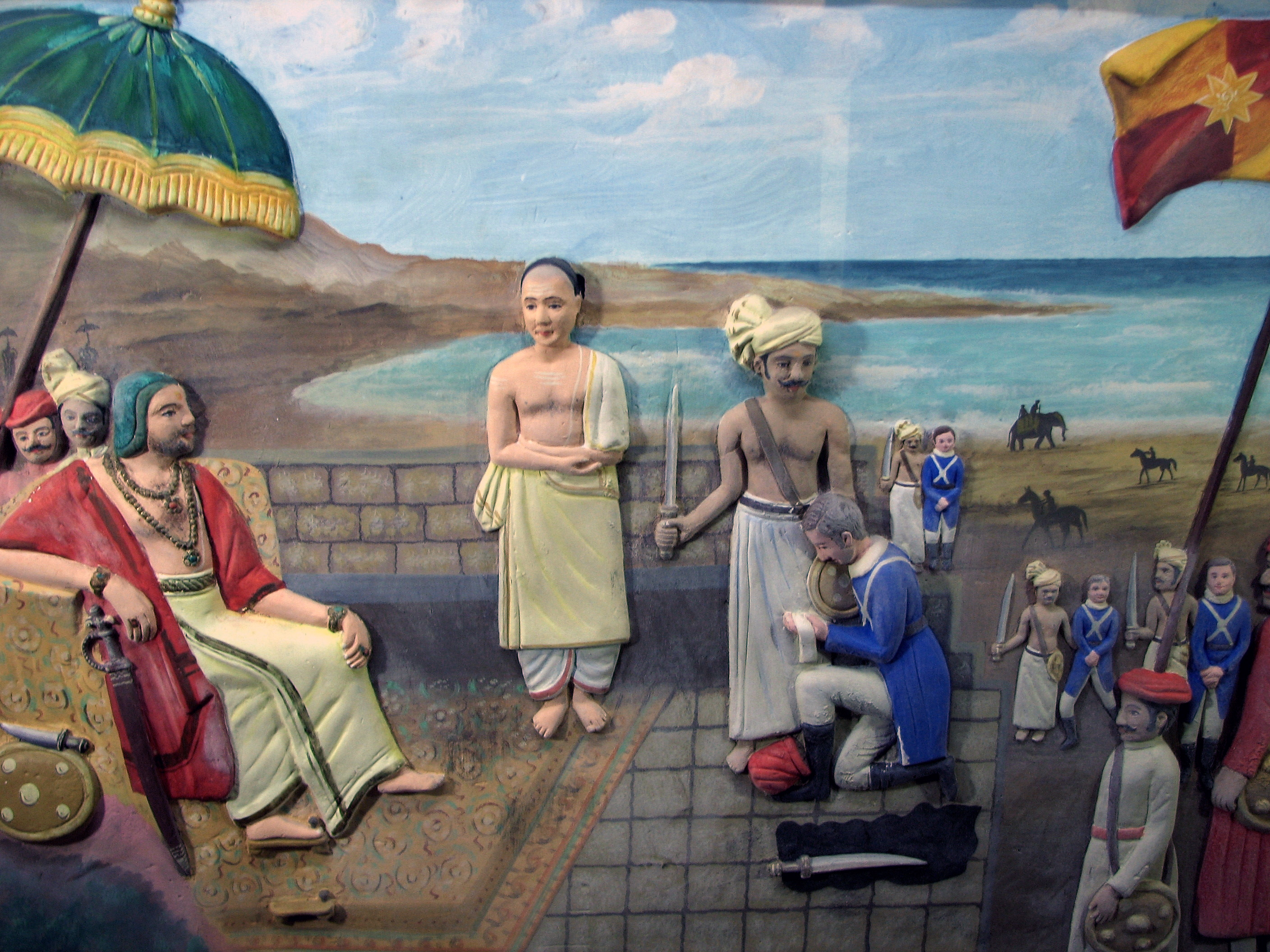
Dutch commander De Lannoy surrenders to Marthanda Varma at the Battle of Colachel (1741). Depiction at Padmanabhapuram Palace.

In 1602, the Zamorin sent messages to Aceh promising the Dutch a fort at Kozhikode if they would come and trade there. Two factors, Hans de Wolff and Lafer, were sent on an Asian ship from Aceh, but the two were captured by the chief of Tanur, and handed over to the Portuguese. A Dutch fleet under Admiral Steven van der Hagen arrived at Kozhikode in November 1604. It marked the beginning of the Dutch presence in Kerala and they concluded a treaty with Kozhikode on 11 November 1604, which was also the first treaty that the Dutch East India Company made with an Indian ruler. By this time the kingdom and the port of Kozhikode was much reduced in importance. The treaty provided for a mutual alliance between the two to expel the Portuguese from Malabar. In return the Dutch East India Company was given facilities for trade at Kozhikode and Ponnani, including spacious storehouses.

The weakened Portuguese were ousted by the Dutch East India Company, who took advantage of continuing conflicts between Kozhikode and Kochi to gain control of the trade. In 1664, the municipality of Fort Kochi was established by Dutch Malabar, making it the first municipality in the Indian subcontinent, which got dissolved when the Dutch authority got weaker in the 18th century. The Dutch Malabar (1661–1795) in turn were weakened by their constant battles with Marthanda Varma of the Travancore Royal Family, and were defeated at the Battle of Colachel in 1741, resulting in the complete eclipse of Dutch power in Malabar. The Treaty of Mavelikkara was signed by the Dutch and Travancore in 1753, according to which the Dutch were compelled to detach from all political involvements in the region. In the meantime, Marthanda Varma annexed many smaller northern kingdoms through military conquests, resulting in the rise of Travancore to a position of pre-eminence in Kerala. Travancore became the most dominant state in Kerala by defeating the powerful Zamorin of Kozhikode in the Battle of Purakkad in 1763. In 1757, to check the invasion of the Zamorin, the Palakkad Raja sought the help of Hyder Ali of Mysore. In 1766, Haider Ali of Mysore defeated the Samoothiri of Kozhikode and absorbed Kozhikode to his state.

=== The Kingdom of Mysore and British influences ===
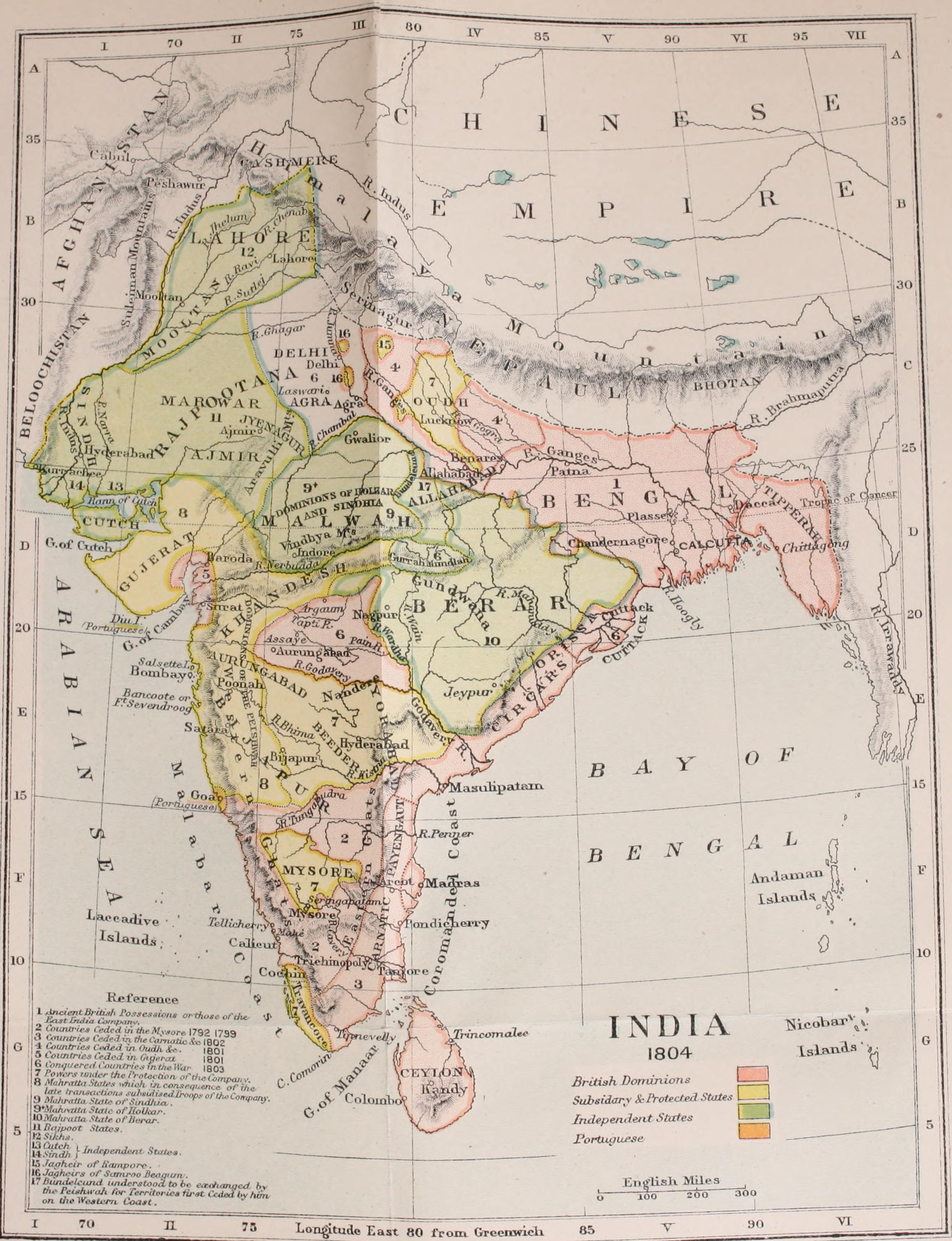
This map includes Kerala in the Southwestern region. The Kingdoms of Travancore and Cochin are seen in yellow.

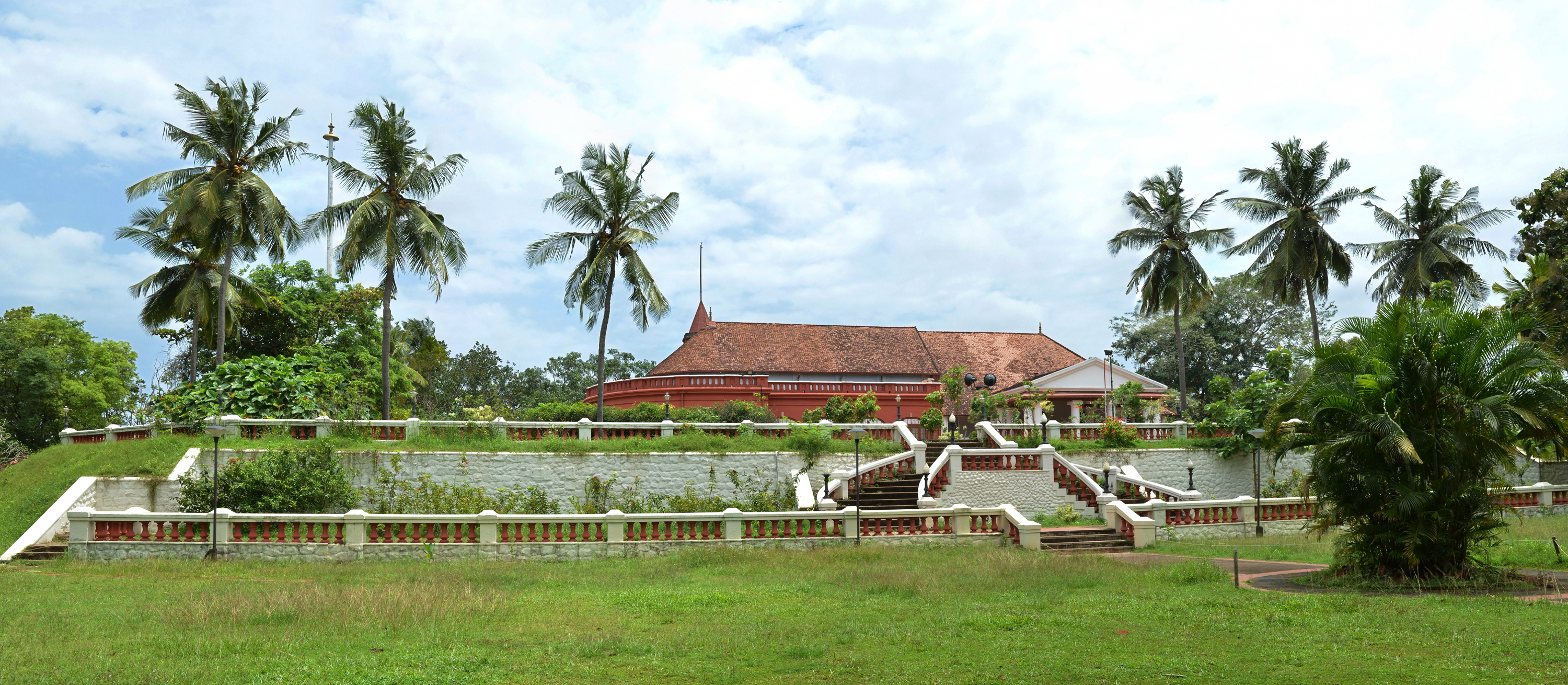
Kanakakkunnu Palace at Thiruvananthapuram. Thiruvananthapuram became a major city on Malabar Coast after the ruler Marthanda Varma annexed all minor kingdoms up to Cochin to form Travancore in the 18th century CE.

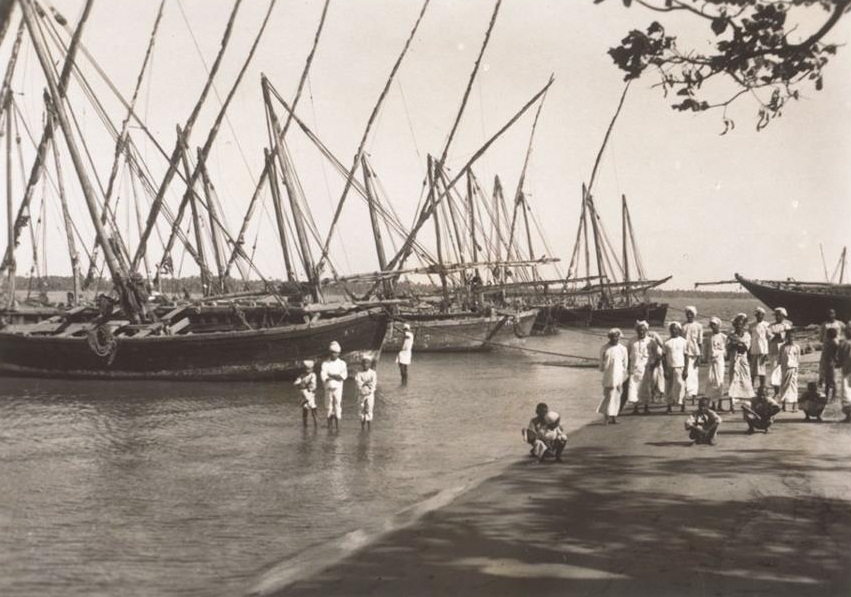
Ponnani harbour in the mid-1930s.

The arrival of British on Malabar Coast can be traced back to the year 1615, when a group under the leadership of Captain William Keeling arrived at Kozhikode, using three ships. It was in these ships that Sir Thomas Roe went to visit Jahangir, the fourth Mughal emperor, as British envoy. The island of Dharmadom near Kannur, along with Thalassery, was ceded to the East India Company as early as 1734, which were claimed by all of the Kolattu Rajas, Kottayam Rajas, and Arakkal Bibi in the late medieval period, where the British initiated a factory and English settlement following the cession.

The smaller princely states in northern and north-central parts of Kerala (Malabar region) including Kolathunadu, Kottayam, Kadathanadu, Kozhikode, Tanur, Valluvanad, and Palakkad were unified under the rulers of Mysore and were made a part of the larger Kingdom of Mysore in the latter half of the 18th century CE. Hyder Ali and his successor, Tipu Sultan, came into conflict with the British, leading to the four Anglo-Mysore wars fought across southern India. Tipu Sultan ceded Malabar District to the British in 1792 as a result of the Third Anglo-Mysore War and the subsequent Treaty of Seringapatam, and South Kanara, which included present-day Kasargod District, in 1799. The British concluded treaties of subsidiary alliance with the rulers of Cochin (1791) and Travancore (1795), and these became princely states of British India, maintaining local autonomy in return for a fixed annual tribute to the British. Malabar and South Kanara districts were part of British India's Madras Presidency.

Kerala Varma Pazhassi Raja (Kerul Varma Pyche Rajah, Cotiote Rajah) (1753–1805) was the Prince Regent and the de facto ruler of the Kingdom of Kottayam in Malabar, India between 1774 and 1805. He led the Pychy Rebellion (Wynaad Insurrection, Coiote War) against the English East India Company. He is popularly known as Kerala Simham (Lion of Kerala). The municipalities of Kozhikode, Palakkad, Fort Kochi, Kannur, and Thalassery, were founded on 1 November 1866 of the British Indian Empire, making them the first modern municipalities in the state of Kerala.

Organised expressions of discontent with British rule were not uncommon in Kerala. Initially the British had to suffer local resistance against their rule under the leadership of Kerala Varma Pazhassi Raja, who had popular support in Thalassery-Wayanad region. Other uprisings of note include the rebellion by Velu Thampi Dalawa and the Punnapra-Vayalar revolt of 1946. The Malabar Special Police was formed by the colonial government in 1884 headquartered at Malappuram. There were major revolts in Kerala during the independence movement in the 20th century; most notable among them is the 1921 Malabar Rebellion and the social struggles in Travancore. In the Malabar Rebellion, Mappila Muslims of Malabar rebelled against the British Raj. The Battle of Pookkottur adorns an important role in the rebellion. Some social struggles against caste inequalities also erupted in the early decades of the 20th century, leading to the 1936 Temple Entry Proclamation that opened Hindu temples in Travancore to all castes. Kerala also witnessed several social reforms movements directed at the eradication of social evils such as untouchability among the Hindus, pioneered by reformists like Sri Narayana Guru, Ayyankali and Chattambiswami among others. The non-violent and largely peaceful Vaikom Satyagraha of 1924 was instrumental in securing entry to the public roads adjacent to the Vaikom temple for people belonging to untouchable castes.

== The Kingdom of Travancore ==
The Kingdom of Travancore was a kingdom in Central and Southern Kerala that existed from ancient times until 1949. Until the reign of Marthanda Varma, the kingdom was known as Venad. In the 11th century, Venad became a vassal of the Chola Empire. In the 16th century, Venad became a vassal of the Vijayanagara Empire. In the late 18th century, Travancore made an alliance with the British Empire and later became a British Protectorate.

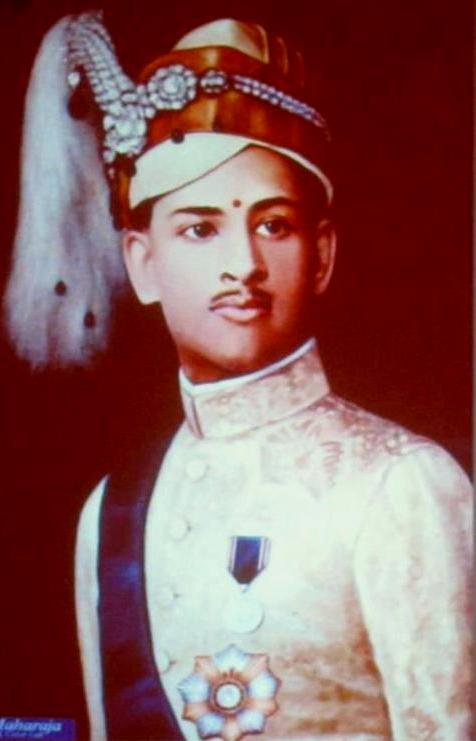
A portrait of Chithira Thirunal Balarama Varma, the last ruling king of Travancore.

=== Details of Chithira Thirunal's Rule and Reforms ===
The last ruling king of Travancore was Chithira Thirunal Balarama Varma, who reigned from 1931 to 1949. "His reign marked revolutionary progress in the fields of education, defence, economy and society as a whole." He made the famous Temple Entry Proclamation on 12 November 1936, which opened all the Kshetrams (Hindu temples in Kerala) in Travancore to all Hindus, a privilege reserved to only upper-caste Hindus till then. This act won him praise from across India, most notably from Mahatma Gandhi. The first public transport system (Thiruvananthapuram–Mavelikkara) and telecommunication system (Thiruvananthapuram Palace–Mavelikkara Palace) were launched during the reign of Sree Chithira Thirunal. He also started the industrialisation of the state, enhancing the role of the public sector. He introduced heavy industry in the State and established giant public sector undertakings. As many as twenty industries were established, mostly for utilizing the local raw materials such as rubber, ceramics, and minerals. A majority of the premier industries running in Kerala even today, were established by Sree Chithira Thirunal. He patronized musicians, artists, dancers, and Vedic scholars. Sree Chithira Thirunal appointed, for the first time, an Art Advisor to the Government, G. H. Cousins. He also established a new form of University Training Corps, viz. Labour Corps, preceding the N.C.C., in the educational institutions. The expenses of the university were to be met fully by the Government. Sree Chithira Thirunal also built a palace named Kowdiar Palace, finished in 1934, which was previously an old Naluektu, given by Sree Moolam Thirunal to his mother Sethu Parvathi Bayi in 1915.

=== Controversial Policies of C.P. Ramaswami Iyer ===
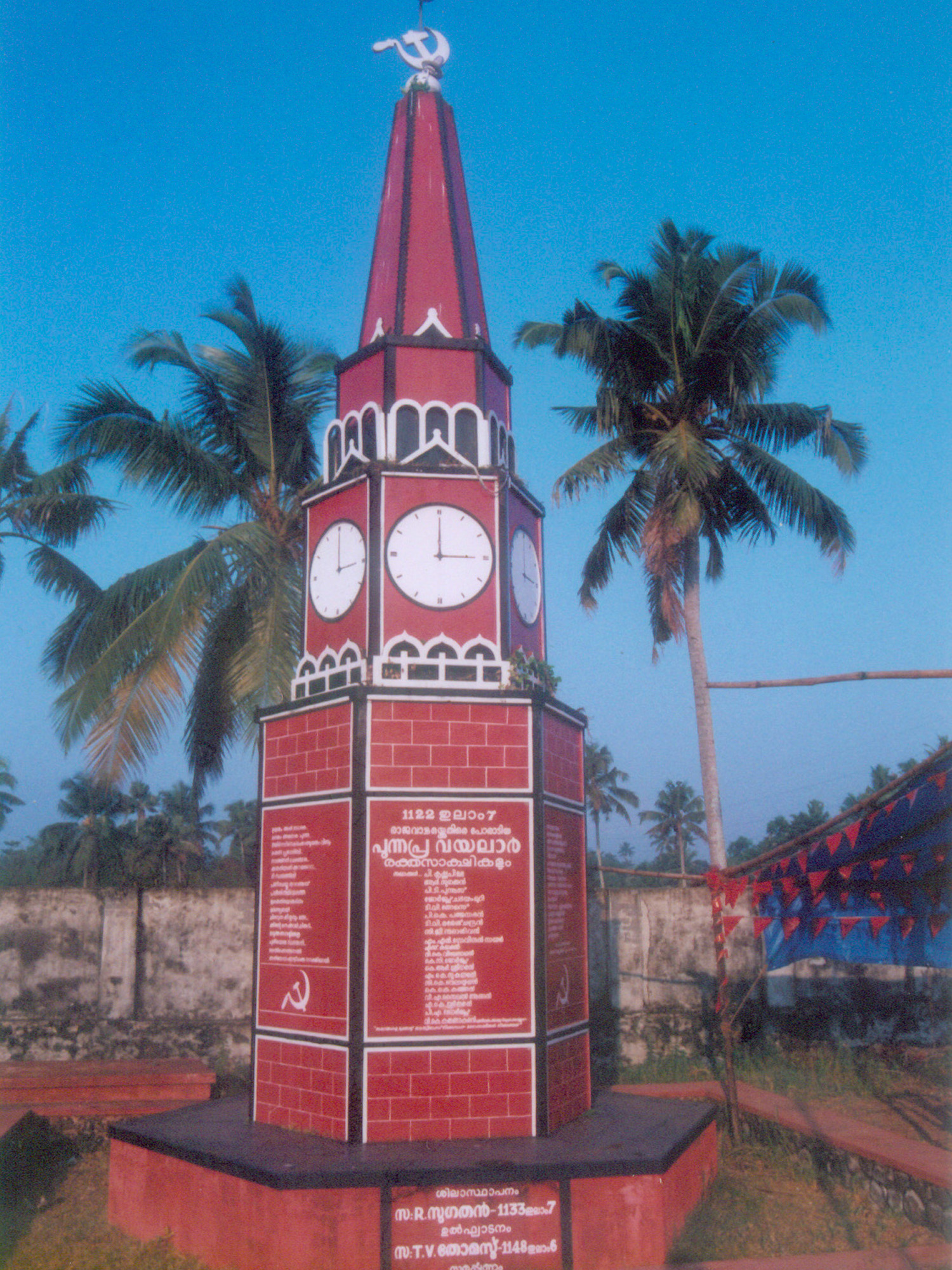
A memorial of the Punnapra Vayalar Uprising in the village of Kalarcode, which is situated close to Alappuzha.

However, his Prime Minister, C. P. Ramaswami Iyer, was unpopular among the communists of Travancore. The tension between the Communists and Sir C.P. Ramaswami Iyer led to minor riots in various places of the country. In one such riot in Punnapra-Vayalar in 1946, the Communist rioters established their own government in the area. This was put down by the Travancore Army and Navy.

=== Attempted Independence of Travancore as a fully sovereign nation ===
The Prime Minister issued a statement in June 1947 that Travancore would remain as an independent country instead of joining the Indian Union; subsequently, an attempt was made on the life of Sir C.P. Ramaswamy Iyer, following which he resigned and left for Madras, to be succeeded by Sri P.G.N. Unnithan. According to witnesses such as K.Aiyappan Pillai, constitutional adviser to the Maharaja and historians like A. Sreedhara Menon, the rioters and mob-attacks had no bearing on the decision of the Maharaja.

=== Annexation into the Republic of India ===
After several rounds of discussions and negotiations between Sree Chithira Thirunal and V.P. Menon, the King agreed that the Kingdom should accede to the Indian Union in 1949. On 1 July 1949 the Kingdom of Travancore was merged with the Kingdom of Cochin and the short-lived state of Travancore-Kochi was formed.

== Republic of India era ==
=== Formation of the state of Kerala ===
A map of Kerala.

The two kingdoms of Travancore and Cochin joined the Union of India after independence in 1947. On 1 July 1949, the two states were merged to form Travancore-Cochin. On 1 January 1950, Travancore-Cochin was recognised as a state. The Madras Presidency was reorganised to form Madras State in 1947.

On 1 November 1956, the state of Kerala was formed by the States Reorganisation Act merging the Malabar District (excluding the islands of Lakshadweep), Travancore-Cochin (excluding four southern taluks, which were merged with Tamil Nadu), and the taluk of Kasargod, South Kanara with Thiruvananthapuram as the capital. In 1957, elections for the new Kerala Legislative Assembly were held, and a reformist, Communist-led government came to power, under E. M. S. Namboodiripad. It was one of the earliest communist governments to be democratically elected to power, second only to San Marino. It initiated pioneering land reforms, aiming to lowering of rural poverty in Kerala. However, these reforms were largely non-effective to mark a greater change in the society as these changes were not effected to a large extent. Lakhs of farms were owned by large establishments, companies and estate owners. They were not affected by this move and this was considered as a treachery as these companies and estates were formed while Travancore was a vassal state of Britain. Two things were the real reason for the reduction of poverty in Kerala. One was the policy for wide scale education and the second was the overseas migration for labour to Middle East and other countries.

=== Liberation struggle ===
The Government of Kerala refused to nationalise the large estates but did provide reforms to protect manual labourers and farm workers, and invited capitalists to set up industry. Much more controversial was an effort to impose state control on private schools, such as those run by the Christians and the NSS, which enrolled 40% of the students. The Christians, NSS, Namputhiris, and the Congress Party protested, with demonstrations numbering in the tens and hundreds of thousands of people. The government controlled the police, which made 150,000 arrests (often the same people arrested time and again), and used 248 lathi charges to beat back the demonstrators, killing twenty. The opposition called on Prime Minister Jawaharlal Nehru to seize control of the state government. Nehru was reluctant but when his daughter Indira Gandhi, the national head of the Congress Party, joined in, he finally did so. New elections in 1959 cost the Communists most of their seats and Congress resumed control.

=== Coalition politics ===
Later in 1967–82 Kerala elected a series of leftist coalition governments; the most stable was that led by Achutha Menon from 1969 to 1977.

From 1967 to 1970, Kunnikkal Narayanan led a Naxalite movement in Kerala. The theoretical difference in the communist party, i.e. CPM is the part of the uprising of Naxalbari movement in Bengal which leads to the formation of CPI(ML) in India. Due to ideological differences the CPI-ML split into several groups. Some groups choose to participate peacefully in electoralism, while some choose to aim for violent revolution. The violence alienated public opinion.

The political alliance have strongly stabilised in such a manner that, with rare exceptions, most of the coalition partners stick their loyalty to the alliance. As a result, to this, ever since 1979, the power has been clearly alternating between these two fronts without any change. Politics in Kerala is characterised by continually shifting alliances, party mergers and splits, factionalism within the coalitions and within political parties, and numerous splinter groups.

Modern politics in Kerala is dominated by two political fronts: the Communist-led Left Democratic Front (LDF) and the Indian National Congress-led United Democratic Front (UDF) since the late 1970s. These two parties have alternating in power since 1982. Most of the major political parties in Kerala, except for the Bharatiya Janata Party (BJP), belong to one or the other of these two alliances, often shifting allegiances a number of time. As of the 2026 Kerala Legislative Assembly election, the UDF has a majority in the state assembly seats (102/140).

== See also ==
- Culture of Kerala
- Economy of Kerala
- Geography of Kerala
- Cuisine of Kerala
- List of years in Kerala
- Timeline of Kerala

== Sources ==
- Menon, A. Sreedhara (2007). A Survey of Kerala History (2007 ed.). Kerala, India: D C Books. ISBN 978-81-264-1578-6.
- Menon, A. Sreedhara (4 March 2011). Kerala History and its Makers. D C Books. ISBN 978-81-264-3782-5.
