= 1997 in Kerala =

- Centuries
- Decades: 1970s; 1980s; 1990s; 2000s; 2010s
- See also: List of years in Kerala; History of Kerala

Events in the year 1997 in Kerala.

== Incumbents ==
Governors of Kerala -

- Khurshed Alam Khan till January 25.
- Sukhdev Singh Kang since January 25.

Chief minister of Kerala – E.K. Nayanar

== Events ==
- May 5 - A bus accident in Mylakkadu, Kollam district on National Highway 47 claims ten lives.
- June 30 - Kerala State Co-operative Consumers Federation Limited starts 1020 Neeti Store across state through a formal inauguration by E. K. Nayanar at Thiruvananthapuram.
- July 9 - United Democratic Front conducts 18 hour Hartal in the state to protest against the arrest of M. V. Raghavan in connection with Koothuparamba firing.
- July 25 - K. R. Narayanan becomes the first Malayali and Dalit to become President of India.
- July 28 - Kerala High Court declares bandh illegal and unconstitutional on a petition filed by the Ernakulam Chamber of Commerce.
- July - KSKTU under leadership of V. S. Achuthanandan launches SRFA (Save Rice Field Agitation) protest against conversion of paddy fields to commercial purposes and cash crops in Alappuzha district.
- August 4 - Government of Kerala took possession of 94 acres of land in Thinkalkarikkakom which was under illegal possession of Thangal Kunju Musaliar through violation of lease terms.
- August 6 - A police raid in an ice cream parlor in Kozhikode reveals Ice cream parlour sex scandal allegedly involving P. K. Kunhalikutty.
- October 9 - Government of Kerala takes control over Sivagiri Mutt through an ordinance.
- October 17 - Elizabeth II the monarch of United Kingdom visits Kochi.
- October - Arundhati Roy becomes the first Indian author to win Booker Prize. She won the prize for her first book The God of Small Things.
- December 6 - An Islamic fundamentalist organization carries out blasts in Chennai-Alleppey Express at Thrissur railway station killing three.

== Deaths ==
- 15 July - Jayaram Padikkal, Indian Police Service officer, 60.
- December 12 - M. G. Soman, actor, 56.

== See also ==
- History of Kerala
- 1997 in India
