= Suryanelli rape case =

1996 incident in Kerala, India

The Suryanelli rape case (also called the Suryanelli sex scandal) refers to a case of kidnapping and subsequent rape of a 16-year-old school girl from Suryanelli, Kerala, India, in 1996. The girl was allegedly lured with the promise of marriage on 16 January 1996 and kidnapped. She was allegedly raped by 37 of the 42 accused persons, over a period of 40 days. The remaining had abetted the crime. After P.J. Kurien, the then Union Minister and later Rajya Sabha Deputy Chairman belonging to UDF led by Congress party, was named, the issue was politicised, due to a then upcoming general election. Several women's rights activists like K. Ajitha and Suja Susan George, and women's organisations, like NFIW and Anweshi, have taken an interest in the case.

On 2 September 2000, a Special Court in Kottayam found 35 of 39, of those who faced trial, to be guilty of various charges. On 12 July 2002, the prime accused - Dharmarajan was found guilty of various charges and sentenced to life imprisonment. However, he left jail on bail on 25 October 2002 and then disappeared. On 20 January 2005, the Kerala High Court acquitted all 35 convicts, except prime accused Dharmarajan, due to lack of evidence corraborating the victim's statement. The court found her to be untrustworthy. The verdict was criticised by women's rights activists. In January 2013, the Supreme Court of India repealed the acquittals awarded by the High Court and ordered a fresh hearing. In early February 2013, Dharmarajan appeared in a TV interview and said that P. J. Kurien was involved and the police covered it up. This stirred a controversy and politicians began demanding Kurien's resignation. The High Court of Kerala has discharged Prof Kurien from all charges on 4 April 2007. The Supreme Court also confirmed it. It has been refuted in Indian Parliament too. Soon after, Dharmarajan was arrested. In May, he retracted his previous statements. Kurien was acquitted by the Kerala High Court.

On 4 April 2014, the Kerala High Court upheld Dharmarajan's life sentence and acquitted 7 of the 35 surviving accused. As of October 2015, the case is in appeal at the Supreme Court.

== Incident and investigation ==
On 16 January 1996, a 16-year-old girl (initially reported as 15), from Suryanelli village in Idukki district, disappeared from her hostel. The family had come to Suryanelli because the father, employee of the Department of Telecommunications, had been posted there. The girl lived in the hostel of the Little Flower Convent School in Munnar, where she was a student. Her father reported her disappearance, but despite a police search she was not found. The girl reappeared after 40 days on 26 February 1996 at her father's workplace. The next day her kidnapping and rape was reported to the police.

The girl was examined by V. K. Bhaskaran (later prosecution witness #73), a gynaecologist at Government Taluk Hospital, Adimali, on 28 February 1996. He noted the vaginal examination was painful and the vulva was oedematous. The doctor, during the trial in 2002, stated that the victim had been subjected to "violent sexual acts". There was infection. The doctor said that intercourse would have been painful, if done during the infection. He said the vaginal wall was not lacerated. (Violent intercourse can result in lacerations.) The doctor said that there was no sign or evidence of resistance. However, the doctor did not rule out the possibility of rape, stating, "If, as stated by the victim, she was raped after being threatened and intimidated, then there would not be any sign of resistance on her body." The infection, inflammation, ulcers and fresh tears, coupled with the victim's visible distress, signified violence. Additionally, he pointed out that contusions or abrasions occurring in the initial days would have healed by the end of the ordeal, given the timeline.

The police named 42 persons as accused initially and 40 of them were found by 1999. The list included politicians and other notable persons.

== Events as established by prosecution ==
Red: Events of the first 24 hours
Munnar: The girl left hostel on 16 January.
Adimali: The girl met up with Raju. They took a bus at 4:30pm.
Kothamangalam: Raju disappeared. The girl reached Kothamangalam at 7:30pm, and decides to go to Kottayam.
Muvattupuzha: The girl reached Muvattupuzha by bus. She noticed Usha on the bus. She changed buses here.
Kottayam: She reached Kottayam. She was approached by Usha and introduced to Dharmarajan. Dharmarajan raped her in a lodge.
Ernakulam: The girl was taken to Ernakulam in a bus.

The prosecution found that she had been coaxed by a bus conductor, Raju (accused #1), to elope with him. The girl was reportedly in love with him. Raju asked the girl to leave her hostel in Munnar and meet him at Adimali on 16 January 1996. There, he convinced her to accompany him to Kothamangalam and they left at 4:30pm. The man abandoned the girl on the bus and disappeared midway. The girl reached the destination at 7:30pm. She decided to travel onward to Kottayam where her mother's sister lived. She took a bus to Muvattupuzha. Reaching Muvattupuzha, she took an auto-rickshaw to the KSRTC bus stand. From there, she took a fast passenger bus towards Trivandrum. On this bus, she noticed a woman, later identified as Usha (accused #2).

She reached Kottayam but was apprehensive of navigating the city's lanes at night. She decided to go to her uncle at Mundakkayam. But, there was no bus to Mundakkayam at night. Usha approached her and offered help. She introduced the girl to one Sreekumar, who was later identified as Dharmarajan, a lawyer and prime accused. He promised that he would take her to Mundakayam later. He told her that his mother was staying at a lodge and she could stay there. The girl agreed to accompany him, but he raped her in the lodge. On the same night, her father had reported her as missing. An assistant sub-inspector had conducted a search but could not locate her.

The next morning she was taken to Ernakulam in a bus. Thereafter, she was taken to the various places, which included Kumili, Kambam, Palakkad, Vanimel, Aluva, Theni, Kanyakumari, Trivandrum, and Kuravilangad. On the morning of 26 February 1996, she was freed. During the intervening period, she was raped or gang raped by 38 of the 42 accused. The remaining four, including Usha and Raju, had abetted the crimes. Several of the 38 were political workers or involved in politics. Later, many claimed the accusation was a conspiracy to frame them.

== Trials and appeals ==
=== 2000-2002 ===
==== Initial convictions ====
On 2 September 2000, the Special Court at Kottayam found 35 of the 39 accused persons to be guilty and four were acquitted. Among the convicts were three women. One of the accused had died during the trial and two were still absconding. The verdict was 356 pages long. The court criticised the police's handling of the case in the initial stages and its attempt to shield the accused persons. Various charges which included Sections 120 (B) (criminal conspiracy), 376 (2)(B) (gang rape), 365 (kidnapping with intent to confine), and 366 (A) (kidnapping with intent to rape) of the Indian Penal Code, were proven against various persons. The sentencing took place on 6 September.

==== Dharmarajan's trial ====
On 16 September 2000, Dharmarajan was arrested from Karnataka. He had been absconding for 4 years. In 2002, the trial of the prime accused, Dharmarajan, began. The court presided by P. Chandrasekhara Pillai found him guilty of several charges including gang rape and abduction on 10 July 2002. The court said that as a lawyer he was aware of the implications of his actions and sentenced him to life in prison on 12 July 2002 by judge V. Chandrasekharan Nair. He was found guilty of Sections 120 (B) (criminal conspiracy), 363 (kidnapping), 366 (A) (kidnapping with intent to rape), 368 (illegal confinement), 332 (hurting a public servant), 373 (buying a minor for sex), 376 (rape), 376(2)(B) (gang rape), 392 (robbery) read with Sections 109 (abetting a crime) and 34 (common intent) of the Indian Penal Code.

Dharmarajan had filed an appeal in the Kerala High Court, but it was rejected on 13 June 2002. After receiving his sentence, Dharmarajan only served a small part of his sentence. He had been sent to the Central Prison, Poojappura on 13 July 2002 and 25 October 2002 he had been released on bail. After that, he disappeared. The police could not track him down and in 2010 the warrant was dropped. He had served 2 years and 92 days, including the time in custody during pre-trial.

=== 2005-2007 ===
==== Kerala High Court's acquittals ====
On 20 January 2005, a Kerala High Court bench, comprising Justice K. A. Abdul Gafoor and Justice R. Basant, overturned the lower court's verdict and acquitted 35 of the 36 accused due to lack of evidence. Dharmarajan's sentence was reduced from life imprisonment to 5 years. The court decided that her statements cannot be taken as the truth in absence of collaborating evidence, as she had been deemed untrustworthy.

==== Defence's arguments ====
The defence had pointed out as girl had squandered her hostel fees on other purposes and had admitted to pawning her jewellery on 1 January 1996, weeks before eloping. The defence said that there was lack of evidence that she had resisted, or indicted to the accused persons that she was an unwilling participant. Thus, rape could not be proved. The only other notable witness, apart from the victim, was accused #42 who had been remanded. She had turned into a prosecution witness. The defence called the victim to be deemed untrustworthy citing past cases.

The defence claimed that the prosecution had also tried to withhold certain evidences and witnesses. One investigating officer initially a prosecution witness, was not called during the second case. He had to be presented by the defence. The prosecution also had tried to suppress evidence that proved that the girl had given her hostel fees to one of the accused. The evidence, regarding a letter left by the girl on the day she vanished, was also suppressed. The initial statements given to various officers after her reappearance were presented a very late date, as a result the defence couldn't make a good case or cross examine the victim properly. They called these unfair towards the accused. The defence also pointed to an early statement made by the father which proved that, he was aware that the girl had run away, not kidnapped.

==== Prosecution's arguments ====
The public prosecutor said that accused #1 had first blackmailed the girl with a photo album and later asked her to leave with him. The girl had given the album to a friend Fatima. Fatima had entrusted the album to accused #1 who had promised to give to the girl. The girl had allegedly collected the money to pay off accused #1. An auto-rickshaw driver had overheard him talking to accused #2 about the girl. The prosecution also provided evidence that the prime accused, Dharmarajan, was residing in the lodge where she was first raped, since 2 January 1996. The prosecution said that this proved that there was conspiracy to abduct the girl. As both her parents were working, the prosecution said that the girl no lack of money and had no need to sort such means. The prosecution also replied to the other contentions raised by the defence.

==== Other evidences and witnesses ====
Blue: Places where the girl was taken
Ernakulam: She taken there on 17 January and kept at a lodge.
Vanimel: The girl was at the house of an accused from 22 to 25 January.
Kumili: The girl was at a rest house from 15 to 21 February. She was allegedly rape by Kurien there on 19. She was taken to the Periyar Hospital on 21.
Elappara: The girl was taken to the Appu Hospital on 25 February.
Other places where she was taken: Kambam, Palakkad, Aluva, Theni, Kanyakumari, Trivandrum, and Kuravilangad.

The court noted that some investigating officers were aware of the existence of a letter written by the girl before her disappearance, but they had not tried to trace it or simply did not present it. The content was only known to a witness who had read it before giving it to the police, and the receiving officer recorded this. The witness had said that letter said that she was going on a trip with accused #1, but later it was claimed the she was lured with the promise of marriage. The auto-rickshaw driver was found an investigator much late into the case on 23 July 1996. Even though by then the case had become infamous, the driver had not approached the police. The investigating officers before him were aware of the letter and thus did not suspect a conspiracy. The appearance of the driver changed the course of the case. Another public witness, used to prove conspiracy, had changed his statement later, claimed that he being harassed by the police and had to move away. The girl had not searched for accused #1 when he allegedly disappeared before Kothamangalam. The court observed that the girl refused to talked about accused #1. The court noted that all these raised doubts on whether there was a conspiracy between accused #1, #2 and Dharmarajan. The court said the letter proved that there was no kidnapping.

The court accepted the evidence proving the girl had stayed at the various places she mentioned, but said that these did not prove non-consent. The girl then just passed the age of consent (then 16 years), so the cases could not be treated as statutory rape. The court noted she had given away her hostel fees to someone and pawned her jewellery. She had given a false name while pawning it. She had been questioned in the Sister Abhaya murder case but she said she couldn't remember it. The court noted that she was expelled from the Mount Carmel School, Kottayam, in Class 8, was home-tutored for a year, before joining Little Flower Girls High School, Nallathanni. When asked for the reason of expulsion, she said that she used to wet her bed and her older sister used to cleaned it up. But, after her sister graduated, she could no longer clean up. But, her tutor, presented as a witness, said that she was expelled for bad conduct. There was also evidence that the father kept close tabs on her movements and frequently called the nuns of the convent school. On 16 January, the school had called the father to inform him that the girl had sought permission to go and give her clothes to the laundry.

The court said that the girl had admitted that she was kept at lodges and hotels wherever she was taken. She was also taken to hospitals twice during the ordeal. But, she did not try to alert anyone about her plight or tried to escape. On the morning of 17 January, she was taken by Dharmarajan to the Kottayam bus stand. Even though the place was familiar to her from the previous day and she had studied for some years in Kottayam while commuting from Mundakkayam to Kottayam, she did not run. Instead, she was taken to Ernakulam. Dharmarajan took a room in Ernakulam at 6:45pm. In a statement, she had said that she went to see a film with him later, this was retracted and the statement was called fabricated. But it was found, the police could not have guessed the film's name. The court said that it implied she was outdoor during daylight in a busy city for hours. In one case, she had been left alone for half-a-day by an accused in a room and she had made no attempt to escape. In another incident on 4 February, one Jacob Sait walked into her room but she did not inform him of her ordeal, and Sait had gone away. In another incident, a room boy had walked in and found her with two men. From 22 January to 25 January, the girl was at the house of an accused in Vanimmel, Kozhikode. A neighbour had seen her on veranda and in the courtyard, but she did not try to escape. She had made a call to her uncle during her captivity, but it was not certain whether her captors forced her to call him. But her uncle did not notify the police, raising doubts on whether it was an abduction.

On 21 February, she was taken to the Periyar Hospital in Kumili. The girl said that she had been taken there because of pain in her private parts and pus was coming out of her vagina. However, the doctor at the Periyar hospital said she looked normal and had a normal gait. The out-patient card showed that she complained only of a sore throat and had a false name. Even though she was alone with the doctor, she did not tell him about her plight or her real name. She told him that she was visiting Thekkady and will return to Ponkunnam. On 25 February, she was staying overnight with an accused at his house, when she complained of stomach pain. She had not revealed her plight to the women family members of the accused. She was taken to Appu Hospital in Elappara. She was diagnosed with constipation and undressed by a nurse for an enema but the nurse did not notice any injuries. The prescription card showed a false name. The robbery charge was against Dharmarajan dropped as the police could not find the ornaments. The girl had said he had forcibly taken her to the jewelers and sold them. The court said that all these raised doubt on the truth of her statements. There was also an evidence Dharmarajan had taken money from other accused, in exchange for supplying the girl.

==== Verdict ====
The court held Dharmarajan guilty of Sections 366 (A) (kidnapping with intention of rape) and 372 (selling a minor for sex) of the Indian Penal Code. He was fined with ₹25,000 for each offence and given a sentence of 5 years. Failure to pay, on each count carried a year of additional jail. Before the trial was complete, the media had begun reporting misleadingly on the judgement. This was noted in the final verdict. The court asked the media to report "only after ascertaining the truth and not from any truncated or partial version." It said that the reports should be based on the complete contents of the judgement. The verdict also recommended raising the age of consent to 18. In November 2005, the Supreme Court of India accepted an appeal against the verdict.

==== Evidences and witnesses ====
The girl and 3 witnesses put Kurien in Kumili at 7:00pm on 19 February.
The 4 witnesses and telephone records put Kurien in Tiruvalla and Perunnai between 3:22pm and 10:22pm on 19 February.

==== Verdict ====
The court noted that the family could have known that Kurien was not named as an accused from media sources. Thus, there was no cause for the delay in filing the complaint. The court also question why Poulose, Rajappan and Kunjukutty were not given to the police as witnesses by the family for one year. The court noted that two of the witnesses who placed Kurien on the crime scene, were chance witnesses and not locals. The court found that prior acquaintance of Poulose with the father suspicious. The court that the lower court had erred by letting case go so far. The court, presided by Justice K. R. Udayabhanu, used the power vested in it under the Section 482 of the Code of Criminal Procedure, 1973, to correct errors of lower court, and discharged the Kurien under Section 227 of the Code of Criminal Procedure, 1973 (insufficient evidence).

==== Supreme Court appeal ====
On 16 November 2007, a Supreme Court bench, comprising Justice K. G. Balakrishnan and Justice R. V. Raveendran, rejected an appeal from the state government seeking a retrial against P. J. Kurien. But, the Court said that it was a private complaint not a state prosecution and no new evidence had been found. Kurien had been represented by Arun Jaitley, also a BJP leader. This later became controversial.

=== 2013-present ===
==== Supreme Court retrial order ====
Following the 2012 Delhi rape case, a women's rights group, Janadhipatya Mahila Association, petitioned the Supreme Court of India pointing out that the appeal against the Kerala High Court's acquittal had been pending for 8 years. Justice Altamas Kabir took cognizance of the case. On the first day, 31 January 2013, a bench of Justice A. K. Patnaik and Gyan Sudha Misra set aside the Kerala High Court's order. A fresh hearing, by the Kerala High Court, and sentencing within six months was ordered.

==== Dharmarajan's arrest ====
After the Supreme Court order, a new warrant was issued for Dharmarajan. On 15 February 2013, the Kerala Police found Dharmarajan in Sagara, Karnataka. The police found him drunk and walking on the streets. On 16 February 2013, he was presented at a Kottayam court. He was ordered to serve rest of his sentence and sent to Thiruvananthapuram prison.

Around 9 February 2013, TV channel Indiavision broadcast an interview of former judge R. Basant, who was part of the two-member bench that acquitted most of the accused in 2005. The video recorded with a hidden camera showed Basant defending his judgement he said, "There was ample evidence to show the girl was used for child prostitution, which is not rape." He also said, "I am not blaming her. The girl is not normal, she is deviant. All these are there in the judgment." He repeatedly asked the interviewer to read the judgement to understand why he and judge Gafoor (by then deceased) had acquitted them. The statements made in the interview were vocally condemned by women's organisations. Basant later did not deny that the interview had taken place, but said the interviewer had come for a discussion and he was not aware that the interviewer was carrying a hidden camera.

On 17 February 2015, K. Sudhakaran, an INC leader, said that people knowing the history of the girl's case would know that she had several chances to escape but she stayed back. He also said that she moved around "as a prostitute, making money and accepting gifts". He added later that prostitution is different from rape. The statement attracted strong criticism from political parties and women's groups.

On 29 May 2013, Dharmarajan retracted his previous statement claiming Kurien's involvement. He said that he had never met him and had only seen him on the news. He also said that he did not own a car back then.

==== Kerala High Court verdict ====
On 4 April 2014, a Kerala High Court bench, comprising Justice K. T. Sankaran and M. L. Joseph Francis, upheld the lower court's sentence, for the prime accused Dharmarajan, of life imprisonment. It also rejected an appeal that the victim was a deviant and did not try to escape, instead, observing that there was clear evidence of prolonged rape and abuse over approximately 40 days. The bench also acquitted seven of the accused. The remaining accused were given sentences ranging from 13 years imprisonment to fine, with 3 months of rigorous imprisonment in case of default. By then, five of the 35 accused had died. In May 2014, arrest warrants were issued for 23 accused who had failed to surrender before the court.

==== Supreme Court appeals ====
In October 2014, 16 accused filed appeals in the Supreme Court of India. On 13 October 2015, the court rejected a bail petition from the accused.

== Victim and her family in the aftermath ==
In 2006, it was reported that the girl was working at the sales tax office at Devikulam. The job had been provided to her by the LDF government under Chief Minister E. K. Nayanar's reign, who belonged to CPI-M. The family had built a house in Suryanelli, but they had to sell it and move away in 2006 due to the hostile environment. The victim's older sister was reported to be working as a nurse in Bangalore.

In 2012, it was reported that the victim had been suspended from her job at the Changanacherry sales tax office in a case of breach of trust and forgery. She was reinstated after 8 months due to public criticism. They said that they were still being treated as outcasts. It was reported that Suja Susan George, a teacher and a CPI-M candidate, was their only family friend. Her older sister had chosen to remain unmarried.

In 2013, she told Sneha Mary Koshy of NDTV that her family had changed house twice due to jeering neighbours. In 2013, she and her family were interviewed by Shahina K. K. of OPEN magazine. The victim said that she does not go to social events. Her work environment was hostile towards her.

== In popular culture ==
A Malayalam language film, Achanurangatha Veedu, was made by director Lal Jose based on this case. The film was released in 2006.

The Chronicle of Golgotha Days a Novel by the author Sujith Balakrishnan was inspired from the 42 days of the tormenting events.

== See also ==
- Rape in India
- Ajmer rape case
- 2012 Delhi rape case
