= 1998 in Kerala =

- Centuries
- Decades: 1970s; 1980s; 1990s; 2000s; 2010s
- See also: List of years in Kerala; History of Kerala

Events in the year 1998 in Kerala.

== Incumbents ==
Governors of Kerala - Sukhdev Singh Kang

Chief minister of Kerala – E.K. Nayanar

== Events ==
- 28 February - Parliament elections for 12th Loksabha held in Kerala.
- 3 March - United Democratic Front bagged 11 out of 20 seats in the Parliament elections.
- 31 March - Peoples Democratic Party leader and Islamic fundamentalist Abdul Nazer Mahdani arrested from Kaloor in connection with 1998 Coimbatore bombings and Hate speech.
- 17 May - Prime Minister of India inaugurates Kudumbashree at Malappuram district.
- 22 May - President of India K. R. Narayanan inaugurates the new legislative assembly building Niyamasabha Mandiram of Kerala.
- 30 July - An Indian Airlines Dornier aircraft crashed at Kochi during take-off and kills nine people which includes six passengers.
- 14 November - Enathu Bridge inaugurated and opened for traffic by P. J. Joseph.
- November - Former Central Reserve Police Force constable Ramachandran Nair confesses before media that deceased Naxalite Arikkad Varghese, was killed in an encounter killing in 1970.

== Dates unknown ==
- By following the National Policy on Education 1986, Kerala implements Pre-Degree Course (Abolition) Act, 1997 and brings pre-degree from University to Higher secondary education.

== Deaths ==
- March 19 - E. M. S. Namboodiripad, former Chief Minister, 88.
- September 9 - Chadayan Govindan, Communist leader, 69.

== See also ==
- History of Kerala
- 1998 in India
