= K. Lakshmana =

Indian police officer (born 1935)

- Born: 1935 (age 90–91); Kasaragod
- Occupation: Former police officer

K. Lakshmana is a Kerala Cadre Indian Police Service officer who retired as State Police Chief of Kerala Police in rank of Inspector General of Police.

He was sentenced to life imprisonment by a CBI Special Court forty years later, in the case relating to the encounter killing of Arikkad Varghese in the Thirunelly forest in Wayanad on 18 February 1970.

== Personal life ==
K. Lakshmana is from Scheduled Caste background and is one of the first direct recruited Deputy superintendent of police from a disadvantaged background. Adv. Sangeetha Lakshmana, prominent advocate who practices at the High Court of Kerala, is his daughter.

== Service record ==
- As DySP in the Anti-Corruption Wing of the Kerala Police in the 1960s, Lakshmana had handled important cases of corruption alleged against Chief Forest Conservatory, Public Works Department, Prisons Department, Directorate of Health Services, Medical Colleges etc. In all these instances, corrupt practices involved were successfully investigated and exposed by this Officer.
- A significant detection on investigation conducted by Lakshmana was the surprise inspection of spurious X-rayequipments supplied in the State Health Department. Spurious led glass used in the X-ray Screen used in the X-ray rooms in hospitals as protection from radiation by the X-ray technicians were detected from various hospitals. Along with that, spurious protective aprons supplied to those X-ray units for use by technicians was also detected. Lakshmana has been instrumental in curtailing the health hazards caused to such X-ray technicians.
- The first case of misuse of original genuine Security Paper used to print the currency notes of the Reserve Bank of India, by the counterfeiters of Kerala, after committing theft of the same from the Security Paper Mill of RBI in Hoshangabad was detected by the Counterfeit Squad of the Crime Branch CID Kerala headed by Lakshmana in the 1970s.
- A member of quack medical practitioners were apprehended and prosecuted by the Crime Branch Team headed by him in the 1970s for the first time in the history of Kerala.
- During The Emergency he was SP of Kozhikode district.
- In a surprise inspection conducted at the Connemera Market, Palayam, Trivandrum in the 1960s he detected meat of diseased animals infected with TB being sold out as ‘pure mutton’ with forged seal of the Corporation Health Officer. Another detection during that raid was the practice of butchers to treat the skinned carcass of male calves of cows in betal leaf juice to make it appear as mutton rather than beef. Tails of goats grafted to the tail of such carcasses of calves to invite the customers were also detected. Such spurious and hazardous meat of low quality being supplied to Mental Hospital Trivandrum was also detected during the said raid conducted by this Officer.
- Apart from his achievements in various investigations of crimes and in enquiries into corruption and other administrative lapses and irregularities, Lakshmana was known for his lightning inspections conducted in police stations and other police offices. His inspection and enquiry reports and case dairies later became the chosen reference materials in the police training colleges of the State Police. Lakshmana was also known for his strictness in enforcing discipline in the State Police in order to prevent misuse of police powers as a result of which he had become the target covert attack by the Kerala Police Association.

== Encounter of Arikkad Varghese ==
In 1970's Naxalite–Maoist insurgency was intense in Wayanad district of Kerala, then part of Kannur district. There were Bolivian Revolutionary style executions conducted by Naxals. Varghese was leader of naxals who executed a landlord named Vasudeva Adiga in Wayanad. Kerala Police and Central Reserve Police Force were combinedly trying to nab Varghese and he gets killed in this in February 1970.

There were lot of controversies surrounding death of Varghese among Naxals and Communist Party of India (Marxist) followers. In November 1998, there was a revelation by CRPF Constable Ramachandran Nair before media that he had shot Varghese following orders from then DySP Lakshmana and DIG Vijayan.

Following this revelation, the latter's brothers and former Naxal colleagues like Ayinoor Vasu approached the Kerala High Court for a CBI probe. The court in 1999 had asked the CBI to investigate Varghese's death. The CBI had filed charge sheets against Nair, Vijayan and Lakshmana before CJM in March 1999.

In the ensuing trial, the court examined 31 witnesses in the trial.

Arikkad Varghese's two brothers and neighbour Prabhakaran, saw a handcuffed Arikkad Varghese being taken by the police, and they testified this in the court. Thomas, one of the brothers had told the court that on the day of the incident, some policemen came to his house and informed the family that Arikkad Varghese had died in an encounter. He had identified the body, which was buried at the compound of their house after the Church refused a resting place.

Delivering the judgment, CBI Special court judge S Vijay Kumar said the first accused in the case, late CRPF constable P Ramachandran Nair had committed the act of murder on the command of Lakshmana, the second accused, who was the then DYSP. The judge convicted Lakshmana of the offence under Section 302 read with Section 34 of IPC

The court also stated that the statement of witnesses has established the presence of Lakshmana on the spot of crime and his giving threatening instructions to Ramachandran Nair to kill Varghese. The court held that it cannot at any stretch of imagination be concluded that all the witnesses have colluded or conspired together to falsely implicate the accused in the case. These witnesses are also not shown to have any element of motive or enmity to the accused, the court held. The chances of Arikkad Varghese who is a Naxalite leader, alone getting isolated in the forest without the company of any of his followers and getting himself engaged in an encounter with a team of armed CRPF men are remote, the court held.

Ramachandran Nair, who died in 2006, had stated that he made the confession after all these years to clear his conscience.

The verdict of the CBI Special Court was later upheld by the Kerala High Court.

== See also ==
- Jayaram Padikkal
- M. Abdul Sathar Kunju
- Jacob Punnoose
- R. B. Sreekumar
- Kerala Police
