= 2002 in Kerala =

- Centuries
- Decades: 1980s; 1990s; 2000s; 2010s; 2020s
- See also: List of years in Kerala; History of Kerala

Events in the year 2002 in Kerala.

== Incumbents ==
Governors of Kerala

- Sukhdev Singh Kang (till April)
- Sikander Bakht (since April)

Chief minister of Kerala – A. K. Antony

== Events ==
- 6 February - Government employees and teachers in Kerala started indefinite strike.
- 2 March - Communist Party of India (Marxist) workers kills two Rashtriya Swayamsevak Sangh workers in Meloor, Kannur district.
- 22 April - Group of villagers and Adivasis starts Plachimada Coca-Cola struggle.
- 27 June - A person named Sankaranarayanan allegedly killed Ahmed Koya who raped and murdered his daughter an year ago in Manjeri.
- 27 July - Kumarakom boat disaster; State Water Transport Department boat accident near Kumarakom kills 29 passengers.
- 1 October - Kerala State Road Transport Corporation launches Volvo B7R buses in Thiruvananthapuram - Kozhikode and Thiruvananthapuram - Palakkad routes and becomes the third government transport company in India to achieve this feat.
- 18 November - A. P. J. Abdul Kalam inaugurates Akshaya project a Computer literacy and governance through ICT project of Government of Kerala.

=== Date not known ===
- Kerala introduces three new RTO codes namely KL-16, KL-17 and KL-18 at Attingal, Muvattupuzha and Vatakara.

== Births ==
- Anaswara Rajan - September 8
- Mathew Thomas - October 16

== Deaths ==
- January 2 - Geetha Hiranyan, 43, poet.
- January 6 - Kunjandi, 82, actor.
- June 19 - N. F. Varghese, 53, actor.
- July 1 - Saswathikananda, 52, head of Sivagiri mutt.
- September 24 - P. R. Pisharoty, physicist, 93.
- December 23 - Ratheesh, 48, actor.

== See also ==
- History of Kerala
- 2002 in India
