= K. Ajitha =

Indian naxalite (born 1950)

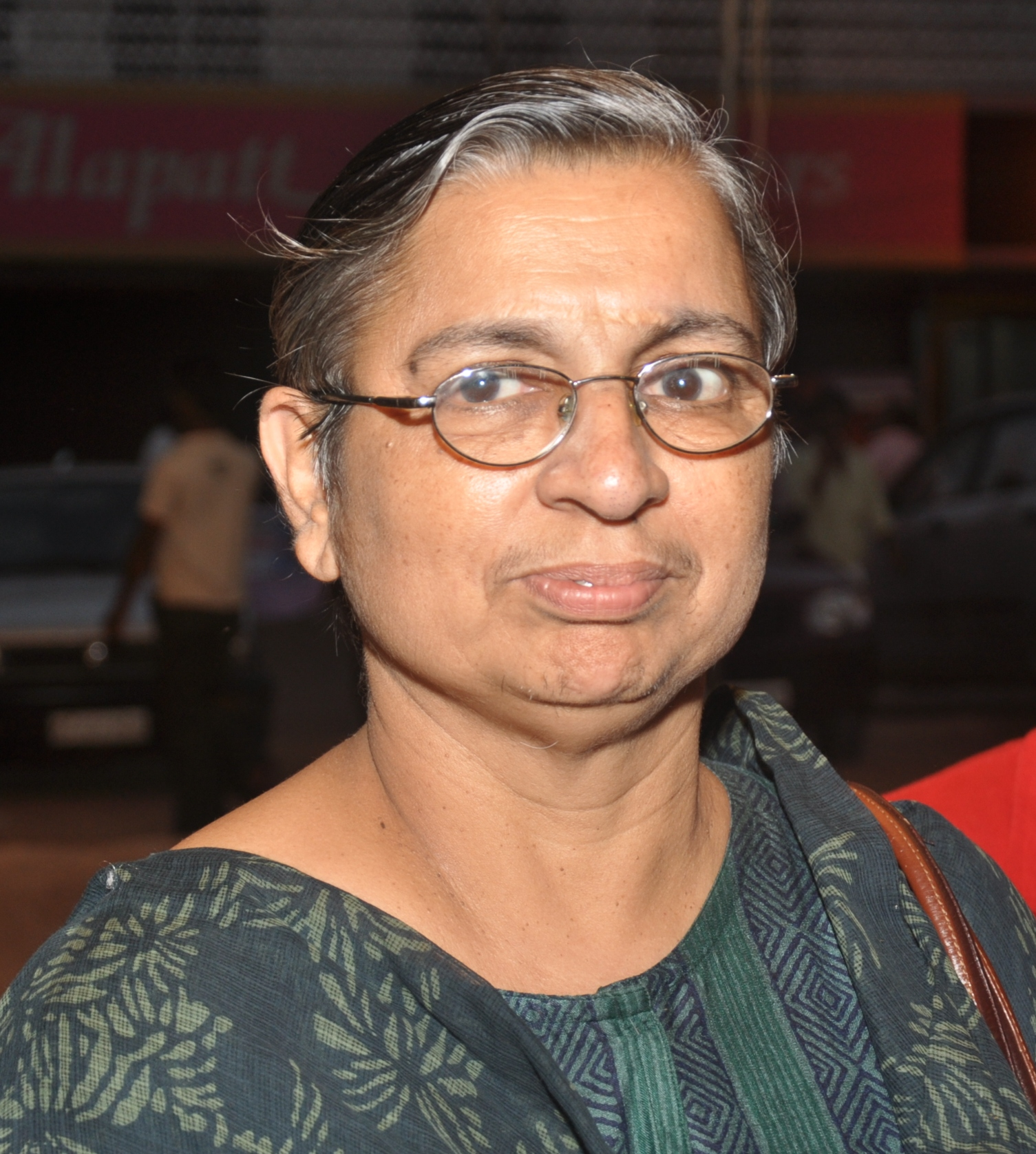
- Born: 1950 (age 75–76); Kerala State, India
- Occupation: Social activist
- Spouse: Yakoob
- Children: Clint, Gargi
- Parent(s): Kunnikkal Narayanan; Mandakini
- Website: Anweshi

Kunnikkal Ajitha (born 1950) is a former Indian naxalite who took active part in the naxalite movements in Kerala in the 1960s when the group conducted armed raids on Thalassery and Pulpally police stations and killed two policemen. Ajitha was subsequently arrested, tried and sentenced to nine years in prison.

After her jail sentence, Ajitha parted ways with the armed struggle movement and is currently a human rights activist and social reformer with an active presence in Kerala's social milieu. Anweshi, the non-governmental organisation she founded in 1993 which now is a constituent of Kerala Sthree Vedhi (Kerala Women's Forum), works for the cause of women's rights in co-ordination with the National Mission for Empowerment of Women.

Ajitha is married to Yakoob, a former colleague and the couple has a son named Clint and a daughter named Gargi. She is an atheist.

== Early years ==
K. Ajitha was born in April 1950 in Kozhikode, Kerala, India to Kunnikkal Narayanan and Mandakini, both active supporters of naxalite movement. She had her early education in Kozhikode. By the time Ajitha reached college, she became disillusioned with the society and started associating with the naxal movement. She dropped out of college while doing Pre-degree course and became an active naxalite.

== Militant years ==
=== Thalassery and Pulpally police station attacks ===
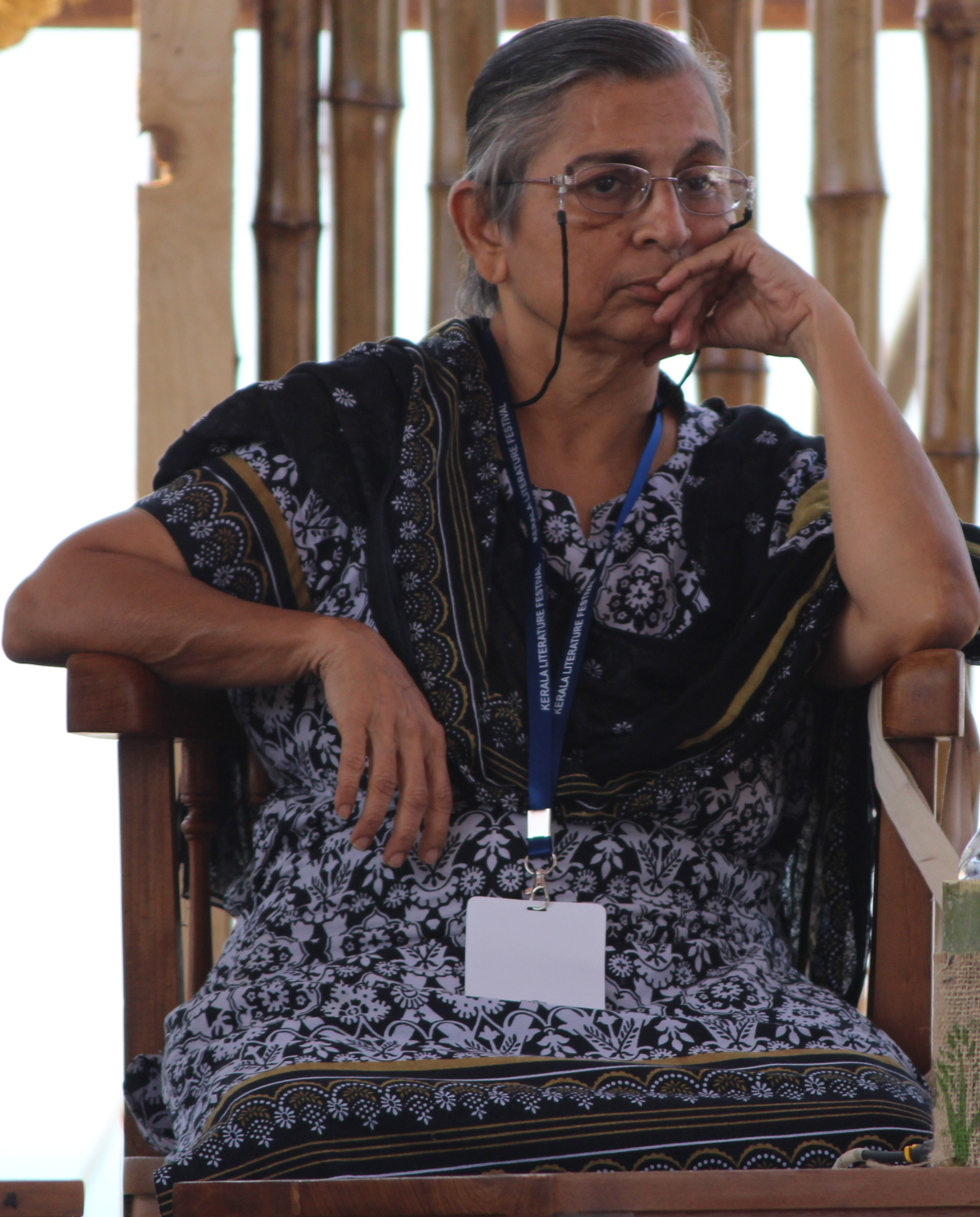

In the late 1960s, Ajitha got associated with Arikkad Varghese, a militant activist working against the atrocities meted out by the feudal lords and police to the tribal and villagers of Wyanad. They formed a group in 1968 and decided to take up arms. Ajitha was the only female member of the group.

On 22 November 1968, a group of about 300 armed guerrillas, under Ajitha's father Kunnikkal Narayanan, made an unsuccessful attempt to attack the Thalassery police station with the aim to steal arms.

48 hours later, on 24 November 1968, the group, under the leadership of Varghese and consisting of Thettamala Krishnankutty, Kurichiyan Kunjiraman, Kisan Thomman, Philip M. Prasad and Ajitha, targeted the Malabar Special Police camp in Pulpally set up to deal with the 7000 farmers who were agitating against the eviction by Pulpally Dewaswom authorities. The armed attack left 2 policemen, a wireless operator and a sub inspector dead. Later, the group attacked the farms of two local landlords and distributed the food grains stocked there to the tribals.

After the raids, the militants entered the dense forests of Wyanad and went into hiding. But, they were captured by the police after a few days of intensive search. Varghese was murdered in a faked encounter. One of the leaders of the group, Kisan Thomman, was also killed in a bomb blast.

=== Prison life ===
After her capture, Ajitha was reported to have endured torture at the police station; she was paraded before the public and was reportedly submitted to the Third degree treatment. After the trial that ensued, Ajitha was sentenced to 9 years of solitary confinement in prison.

She spent the first half of the term at the Central Jail at Trivandrum and the latter half at the Cannanore jail where her parents were also imprisoned. Ajitha used the time in prison to learn about the problems faced by women of Kerala, especially sex workers.

She was released in 1977 after 8 years at the age of 27.

== Social career ==
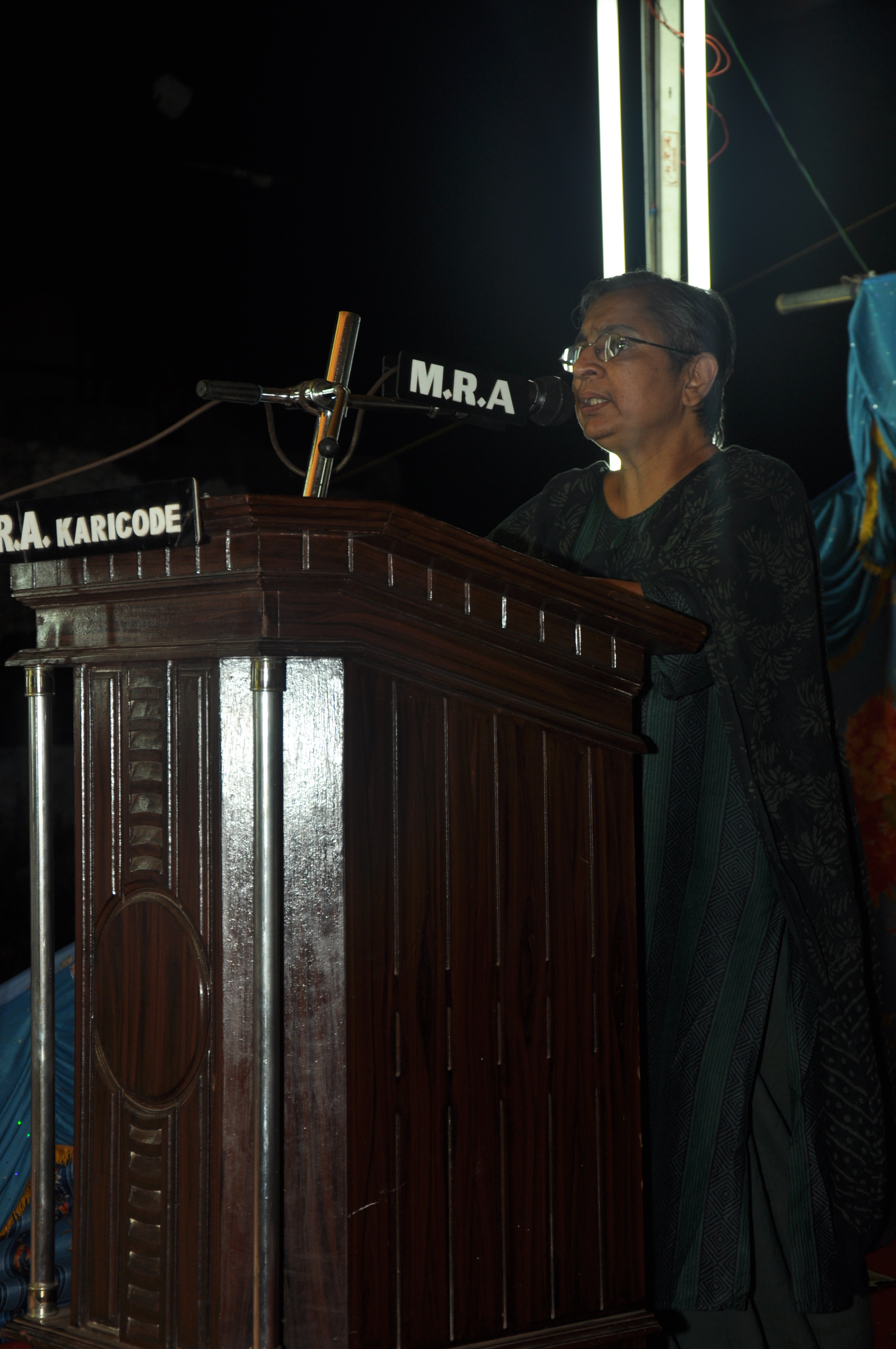

After her release from prison, Ajitha attempted to start a normal life, married Yakoob and gave birth to a baby girl. However, it was a short-lived attempt when, in 1988, a conference of women's organisations in Mumbai influenced her to return to social activism and she founded an organisation called 'Bodhana' (Awareness), based in Kozhikode (Calicut).

The organisation could not carry on for long but Ajitha set up another organisation called Anweshi (the Searcher) in 1993. She was an active participant in many sensational human rights cases in Kerala.

=== Ice cream parlour case ===
Ice cream parlour case (1997) involved the sexual exploitation of minor girls at a local ice cream parlour in Kozhikode which offered ice cream laced with sedatives to sexually exploit them later. The scandal surfaced when five minor girls approached Ajitha who, under the aegis of Anweshi, conducted a private investigation and reported the matter to the police. They alleged that the dead bodies of two teenage girls found on the railway tracks in the city had strong connection with the case. Many known names such as that of P. K. Kunhalikutty, Kerala's Industries Minister at that time and leader of Indian Union Muslim League (IUML), CPM leader T.P Dasan and some custom officials featured on the list of accused.

During the trial, two of the five victims retracted their statements. Kerala High Court, in 2005, dismissed the petition and the Supreme Court dismissed the case citing lack of evidence in 2006.

== Amnesty International ==
In 2016, she supported Amnesty international in the controversy against ABVP.

== Awards and recognitions ==
Anweshi, the NGO founded by Ajitha, has received many awards for its contribution to the social cause.

- Jana Samskruti Award, Abu Dhabi, 1997
- Lakshmi Award by Sahrudaya Vedi, Trichur, 1997
- Yugadeepam Sam Award-Trivandrum, 1998
- Kamala Bhaskar Award, by Bhaskar Foundation, 2003
- Sadguru Jnanananda Award by Manava Seva Dharma Samvardhini Trust, Chennai, 2004
- V.K. Rajan Puraskaram, Bhoomika Trust, Kodungalloor, 2004
- Award by B.P. Moideen Seva Mandir, Mukkam, Kozhikode, 2004.
- Award by K.Balakrishnan Smaraka Samithi for human rights activist, 2007
- R. Shankaranarayanan Thampi Smaraka Award on 2 November 2009
