= Abdul Sathar Kunju =

Indian police officer (1939–2025)

M. Abdul Sathar Kunju
- അബ്ദുൽ സത്താർ കുഞ്ഞ്
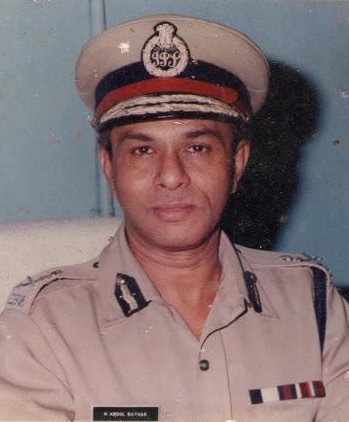
- Abdul Sathar Kunju in the 1990s

Director General of Police, Kerala
- In office 1996- 1997
- Preceded by: R. Radhakrishanan IPS
- Succeeded by: C.A Chaly IPS

Inspector General of Police, Kerala
- In office 1986-1996

Personal details
- Born: M. Abdul Sathar Kunju; 26 June 1939 Oachira, Kollam, Kerala, India
- Died: 13 January 2025 (aged 85) Thiruvananthapuram, Kerala, India
- Spouse: Rafiya
- Education: BA English, 1960; MA Political Science, 1962; Bachelor of Laws
- Alma mater: Sree Narayana College, Kollam, University of Kerala; Government Law College, Thiruvananthapuram
- Occupation: Law Enforcement Officer
- Awards: Police Medal for Meritorious Service; President’s Police Medal for Distinguished Service

M. Abdul Sathar Kunju (26 June 1939 – 13 January 2025) was an Indian civil servant and 1963 batch officer of Kerala cadre of Indian Police Service who retired as the 21st chief of Kerala Police in 1997.

== Early life and education ==
Abdul Sathar Kunju was born on the 26th day of June 1939 in the erstwhile Princely State of Travancore into an affluent family in the small town of Ochira to Mohammed Kunju and Saliha Umma.

M. Abdul Sathar Kunju did his undergraduate and post graduate studies at S.N. College Kollam, University of Kerala. He bagged the prestigious Dr. A. Ramaswamy Mudaliar Gold Medal instituted by University of Kerala for securing first rank in Political Science.

Former Karnataka Cabinet Minister and retired Chief Secretary J Alexander and Former Director General of Police of Kerala Mr. N. Krishnan Nair were his batchmates at S.N. College. The trio qualified the Civil Service Exam in the same year, i.e. 1963.

== Career ==
=== Training ===
Sathar Kunju joined the Indian Police Service in 1963. He underwent the Foundation Course (FC) at National Academy of Administration Mussoorie, where his batchmates included future Ministers Mani Shankar Aiyar (Indian Foreign Service), S.Krishna Kumar (IAS: Kerala) and J. Alexander (IAS: Karnataka Cadre). The 1963 Batch also included T.R. Prasad (IAS: Andhra Pradesh), T.K.A. Nair (IAS: Punjab) and Sanjivi Sundar (IAS: Gujarat).

Abdul Sathar Kunju subsequently underwent Police Training at Mount Abu, where the then National Police Academy was located. He belonged to 16 RR of IPS where future Kerala Governor Nikhil Kumar was his batch mate. R. K. Raghavan was also his batchmate.

=== Kerala Cadre ===
Sathar Kunju got allotted to Kerala Cadre of Indian Police Service. He started his career as Assistant Superintendent of Police of Alwaye, in 1966. He subsequently took over as Assistant Commissioner of Police, Kochi.

In 1967, he got promoted to the rank of Superintendent of Police. He served as Superintendent of Police of Kottayam, twice. In 1971, he took over as Superintendent of Police, Thiruvananthapuram Rural. Abdul Sathar Kunju also served as Superintendent of Police, Alappuzha. He also served as SP Government Railway Police (GRP).

He headed Police Training College, Thiruvananthapuram as its Principal. He also served the Motor Vehicle Department as Joint Transport Commissioner from 1983 to 85.

Sathar Kunju served as Deputy Inspector General with Vigilance and Anti-Corruption Bureau for three years. His tenure as D.I.G. South Zone saw the effective containment of riots at Poonthura and some other places.

Till 20.11.1981, Kerala Police was headed by an officer of the rank of Inspector General of Police.

Abdul Sathar Kunju served as D.I.G. (Crimes), Inspector General of Police (Crimes) and Additional Director General of Police (Crimes), before getting promoted to the rank Director General of Police.

He served as Director General of Police Jails from 18.10.1996- 05.06.1997. In early 1997 Mr.Sathar Kunju also held the post of Commandant General of Kerala Fire and Rescue Services.

Sathar Kunju took charge as Kerala’s State Police Chief (S.P.C.) in the rank of Director General Of Police in June 1997 and superannuated from service on the same month at the age of 58 years. Chief Minister E. K. Nayanar also held the Home Portfolio during Abdul Sathar Kunju’s tenure as Director General of Police (Law and Order)

== Criminal investigation ==
Abdul Sathar Kunju as Deputy Inspector General (South Zone) oversaw the Investigation of the famous Ettumanoor Temple Theft case. It was highly appreciated by the then state Government.

Abdul Sathar Kunju served as Deputy Inspector General of Police, Inspector General of Police and Additional Director General of Police in the Crime Branch C.I.D of Kerala Police.

Abdul Sathar Kunju was instrumental in creating the post of Medico-Legal Adviser for Kerala Police when he was Inspector General of Police (Crime Branch C.I.D). Noted forensic surgeon and later Principal of Government Medical College Thiruvananthapuram Dr. B. Umadathan was the first occupant of this post.

== Recognition ==
He was awarded the President’s Medal for Meritorious Service and President's Medal for Distinguished Service.

== Family ==
He is married to Smt. Rafiya and the couple has two sons and two daughters.

== Death ==
He died on 13 January 2025 in Thiruvananthapuram at the age of 85.

== In books ==
- Memoirs of a Forensic Surgeon by Dr. Umadathan (former Principal of Government Medical College Thiruvananthapuram) discussed in detail about the contribution of Sathar Kunju.
- Kerala Muslim History, Statistics and Directory by Dr. C.K. Karim in Volume-3 has a brief biographical write up.

== See also ==
- Kerala Police
- Department of Home (Kerala)
- K Lakshmana
- Jayaram Padikkal
- Jacob Punnoose
