= Mandakini Narayanan =

Naxalite leader

Mandakini Narayanan (died 16 December 2006), popularly known as Ma, was an Indian Naxalite leader in Kerala.

== Life ==
Born in Gujarat, she married the late Naxal leader Kunnikkal Narayanan. She herself was one of the front-runners of the Naxalite movement in Kerala, a prominent state in India.

Mandakini was born to a Gujarati couple, Navin Chandra Osa and Urvashi Osa. She worked with the undivided Communist Party while studying in Mumbai.

Mandakini, along with her husband and daughter, led several agitations waged by Naxalites in Kerala. She was arrested and sent to jail in the Pulpally and Thalassery police stations attack cases, which resulted in death of two police officials. She received a sentence of two and a half years during the emergency and was subjected to severe police excesses.

Mandakini died on 16 December 2006, at the age of 82.

Mandakini was survived by her daughter K. Ajitha, Naxalite turned human rights activist and social reformer. Ajitha now champions the cause of women-rights and fights against social evils and corruption through an organization named ANWESHI.
