= Arikkad Varghese =

Indian communist (1938–1970)

Naxal Varghese

1st Kerala State Secretary of CPIML
- In office 1969–1970

Personal details
- Born: 19 February 1938 Vellamunda, Malabar District, British India
- Died: 18 February 1970 (aged 31) Thirunelli, Kerala, India
- Party: CPIML
- Known for: Communist activist Murdered by the police

Arikkad Varghese (19 February 1938 – 18 February 1970), popularly known as Saghavu (Comrade) Varghese or Naxal Varghese was an Indian left-wing extremist - Naxalite CPIML leader involved in activities supposedly supporting Adivasis in Wayanad during the 1960s. His actions were linked to advocating for the rights of Adivasis against alleged exploitation by individuals with feudal affiliations and political connections. Varghese was heavy influenced by left wing ideologies will resulted in direct actions of against authorities.

Varghese's death was shrouded in controversy, initially portrayed as a accidental death confrontation with the police, but after 40 years in early 2000’s, a former policeman Ramachandran, then constable in Kerala Police confessed to being responsible for his death. However, the full truth and motive behind the incident or whether several other police or feudal authorities were involved or not remains unresolved.

CPIML leaders and activists who worked with Arikkad Varghese were Ajitha, and Grow Vasu.

== Naxal life ==
Arikkad Varghese, among others, was allegedly involved in actions against what some perceive as the misuse and exploitation of illiterate Adivasi people in Wayanad during the 1960s. The Naxalites, according to reports, were linked to the assassination of several landlords, purportedly distributing assets gained from these landlords to the poor. Inspired by the Naxalbari uprising, they instigated the Thalassery-Pulpally riots. Key leaders in these riots were Kunnikkal Narayanan, who led the assault on the Thalassery police station, and Varghese, who targeted the Pulpally wireless station.

Following these attacks, Narayanan's group dispersed. Similarly, Varghese's group, identified by locals in Adakkathode, Kannur, was forced to scatter as well. Varghese managed to escape capture and found refuge in Karinkalkuzhi, Kannur.

In the 1970s, Varghese and his team persisted in their operations, spreading fear across the Thrissileri-Thirunelli regions of Wayanad through targeted acts of violence and destruction.These actions not only instilled terror among the local population but also brought about significant changes in the socio-political, economic, and agricultural sectors of Kerala, particularly in Wayanad.

Subsequently, authorities attempted to quell these activities, and by 1970, the protests reportedly weakened.

== Death ==
On 17 February 1970, Varghese sought shelter and food from Karimath Sivaraman Nair. During his rest, reports suggest someone alerted the police, leading to his arrest. His body was later discovered at Koomparakuni near the Thirunelli police station. Allegedly, the church declined to bury his body, and he was subsequently interred at his ancestral home in Ozhukkan Moola, Vellamunda.

Police constable P. Ramachandran Nair admitted publicly in 1998 that he had shot Varghese on orders of K. Lakshmana, then a deputy superintendent of police. A gun was planted on the dead body to imply that he had been shot dead in an encounter with the police. On 28 October 2010, in a historic judgement a special CBI court found former police officer K. Lakshmana guilty of compelling Ramachandran Nair to shoot Varghese and was sentenced to life imprisonment and a fine of ten thousand rupees. The verdict was later upheld by the Kerala High Court.

== Legacy ==
Varghese is often called 'Kerala Che Guevara', comparing him with the iconic Cuban communist revolutionary, because of the similarity of work he undertook for the underprivileged and the similarity in the circumstances of death.

== In popular culture ==
The 2008 Malayalam film Thalappavu directed by Madhupal, has the murder of Varghese as its main theme. Malayalam actor Prithviraj played the role of Naxal Varghese in the movie.

Malayalam film Kabani Nadi Chuvannappol (1975) also portrays the life of Naxalite Varghese.

== See also ==
- Thalappavu (film)
- Rajan case
