= 1996 in Kerala =

- Centuries
- Decades: 1970s; 1980s; 1990s; 2000s; 2010s
- See also: List of years in Kerala; History of Kerala

Events in the year 1996 in Kerala.

== Incumbents ==
Governors of Kerala -

- P. Shiv Shankar till April.
- Khurshed Alam Khan since May.

Chief ministers of Kerala –

- A.K. Antony till May 9.
- E.K. Nayanar from May 20.

== Events ==
- 16 January - Suryanelli rape case
- 24 January - Kerala Legislative Assembly equivocally passed Kerala Scheduled Tribes (Restriction on Transfer of Lands and Restoration of Alienated Lands) Act which legalised all Adivasi land transactions till date.
- 1 April - AK Antony government bans Arrack in Kerala and shuts down 5600 country liquor shops.
- 14 May - An accident in an unmanned Level crossing claims 35 lives in Cheppad.
- 29 July - Valiyapalam Bridge on Main Eastern Highway at Ranni collapsed.
- 17 August - EK Nayanar government begins implementation of People's Planning in Kerala, which effectively decentralize nearly 35% of state budget to Local self government bodies.
- 17 September - The first Mobile phone conversation in Kerala taken place at Ernakulam between Thakazhi Sivasankara Pillai and Vice Admiral AR Tandon on an Escotel mobile network.
- 4 October - A pro-maoist outfit named Ayyankali Pada kept District magistrate of Palakkad district in hostage using fake weapons to protest against Kerala Scheduled Tribes (Restriction on Transfer of Lands and Restoration of Alienated Lands) Act.
- 9 October - Pradip Somasundaran wins Meri Awaz Suno reality show in Doordarshan.
- 8 November - Kerala's first Bailey bridge opened in Ranni as a makeshift arrangement.

=== Dates unknown ===
- The first edition of International Film Festival of Kerala held in Kozhikode to commemorate 100th anniversary of Filmmaking.
- Indian Institute of Management Kozhikode established.

== Deaths ==
- 23 April - V. Sambasivan, 67, Kadhaprasangam artist.
- 23 September - Silk Smitha, 36, actress.

== See also ==
- History of Kerala
- 1996 in India
