= Seetha Mount =

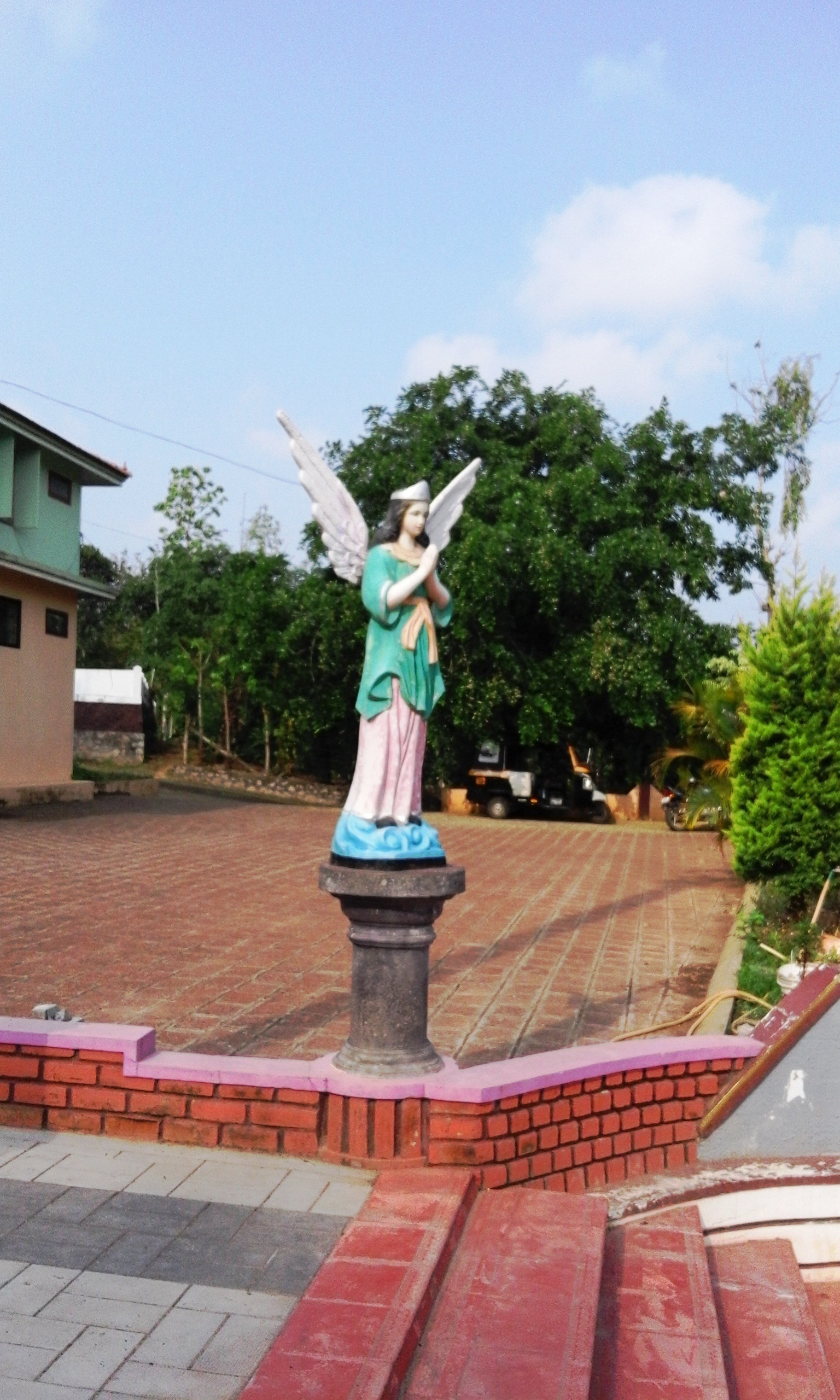
- Interactive map of Seetha Mount
- Coordinates: 11.83677°N 76.20083°E
- Country: India
- State: Kerala
- District: Wayanad
- Time zone: UTC+5:25 (IST)
- PIN: 673579

Seetha Mount is a small village near Pulpally in Wayanad district of Kerala state in India.

== Location ==
Seetha Mount is located about nine kilometers from Pulpally on the road to Kabanigiri village on the bank of river Kabini.

== Landmark ==
There is a large church in the village and a small school nearby. The postal code of the village is 673579.

== Transport ==
Seetha Mount village is near Pulpally town which can be accessed from Mananthavady. The Periya ghat road connects Mananthavady to Kannur and Thalassery. The Thamarassery mountain road connects Calicut with Kalpetta. The Kuttiady mountain road connects Vatakara with Kalpetta and Mananthavady. The Palchuram mountain road connects Kannur and Iritty with Mananthavady. The road from Nilambur to Ooty is also connected to Wayanad through the village of Meppadi.

The nearest railway station is at Mysore and the nearest airports are Kozhikode International Airport-120 km, Bengaluru International Airport-290 km, and Kannur International Airport, 58 km.

== Image Gallery ==
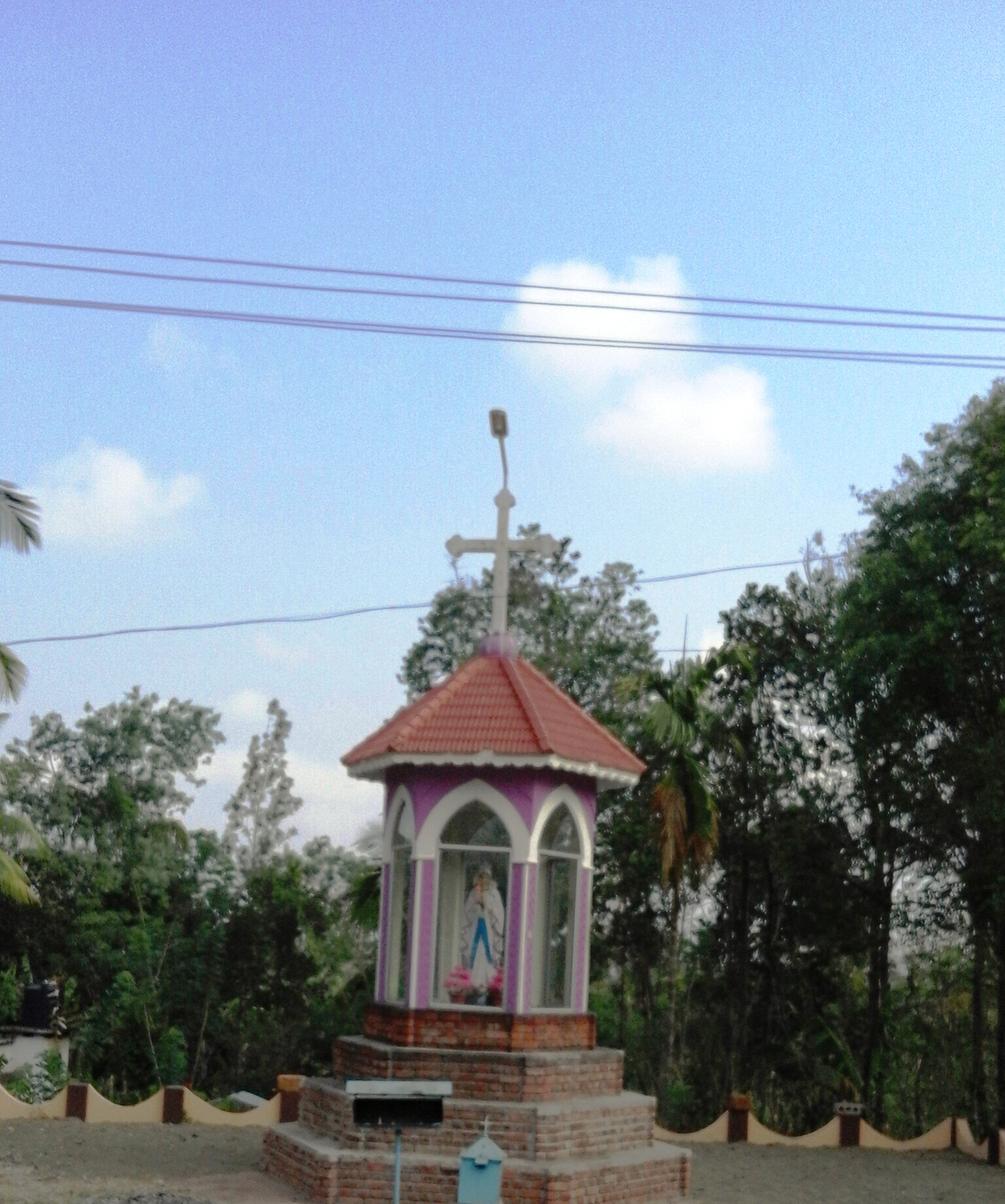
Kappela

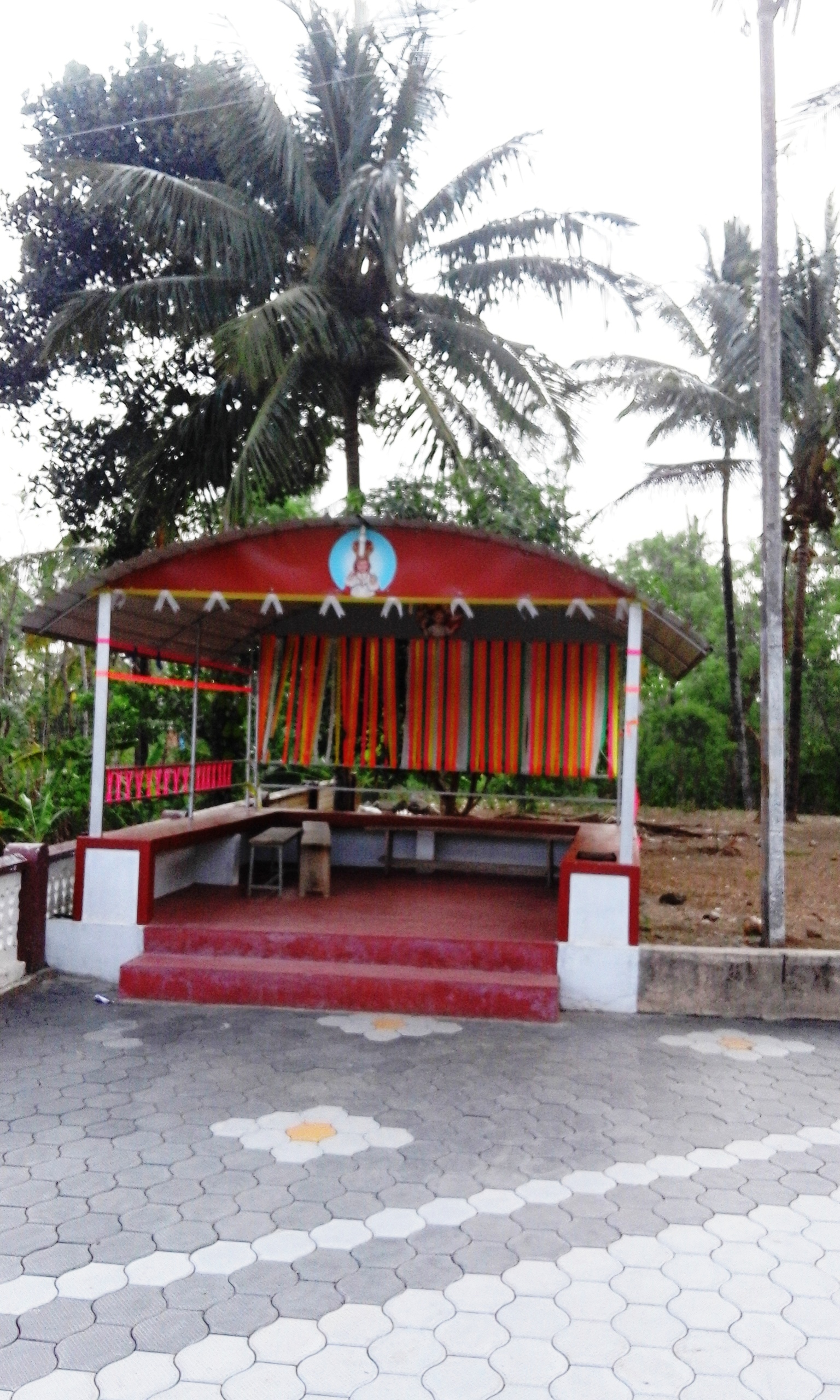
Church
