= 2000 in Kerala =

- Centuries
- Decades: 1980s; 1990s; 2000s; 2010s; 2020s
- See also: List of years in Kerala; History of Kerala

Events in the year 2000 in Kerala.

== Incumbents ==
Governors of Kerala - Sukhdev Singh Kang

Chief minister of Kerala – E.K. Nayanar

== Events ==
- February 12 - Minister Neelalohithadasan Nadar resigns over sexual harassment complaint filed against him by Nalini Netto IAS. Another Indian Forest Service officer also filed complaint against him regarding an incident in 1999.
- June 1 - Kerala High Court declared Bandh as unconstitutional.
- June 11 - Cochin International Airport became international airport.
- August 17 - Kairali TV a Malayalam language Television broadcasting service promoted by Communist Party of India (Marxist) launched.
- September - K.K. Usha became the first women Chief Justice of Kerala High Court.
- September 27 - A girl named Asna aged 8 injured in a bomb attack on her home by Rashtriya Swayamsevak Sangh workers in Kannur district.
- October 21 - A hooch tragedy in Kalluvathukkal claims 31 lives and eyesight of nearly 500 people.
- December 12 - An Earthquake measuring 5.0 in Richter magnitude scale felt in Idukki district and Kottayam district of Kerala.
- December 26 - Prime Minister of India Atal Bihari Vajpayee arrives at Kumarakom for a week long holiday.

== Birth ==
- Naslen - June 11
- Aarsha Chandini Baiju - November 8

== Deaths ==
- March 23 - Antony Padiyara, Archbishop of the Syro-Malabar Church, 79.
- April 27 - Puthupally Raghavan, political activist, 90.
- August 26 - Balan K. Nair, actor, 67.
- October 17 - Kudamaloor Karunakaran Nair, Kathakali artist, 84.

== See also ==
- History of Kerala
- 2000 in India
