= Padikkal =

Indian surname

Padikkal, alternatively known and spelled as Padikkala, is a Malayali surname commonly found in Kerala, India. The surname has historically been associated with prominent ancestral households noted for scholarly traditions, literacy, and education. It is primarily found among upper-caste Hindu communities, including Brahmin and Nair families, as well as among the historically aristocratic and socially prominent Syrian Christian communities of Kerala.

Notable people with this surname include:

- Devdutt Padikkal (born 2000), Indian cricketer
- Jayaram Padikkal (1936–1997), Indian police official
