= Sibi Pulpally =

Indian photographer

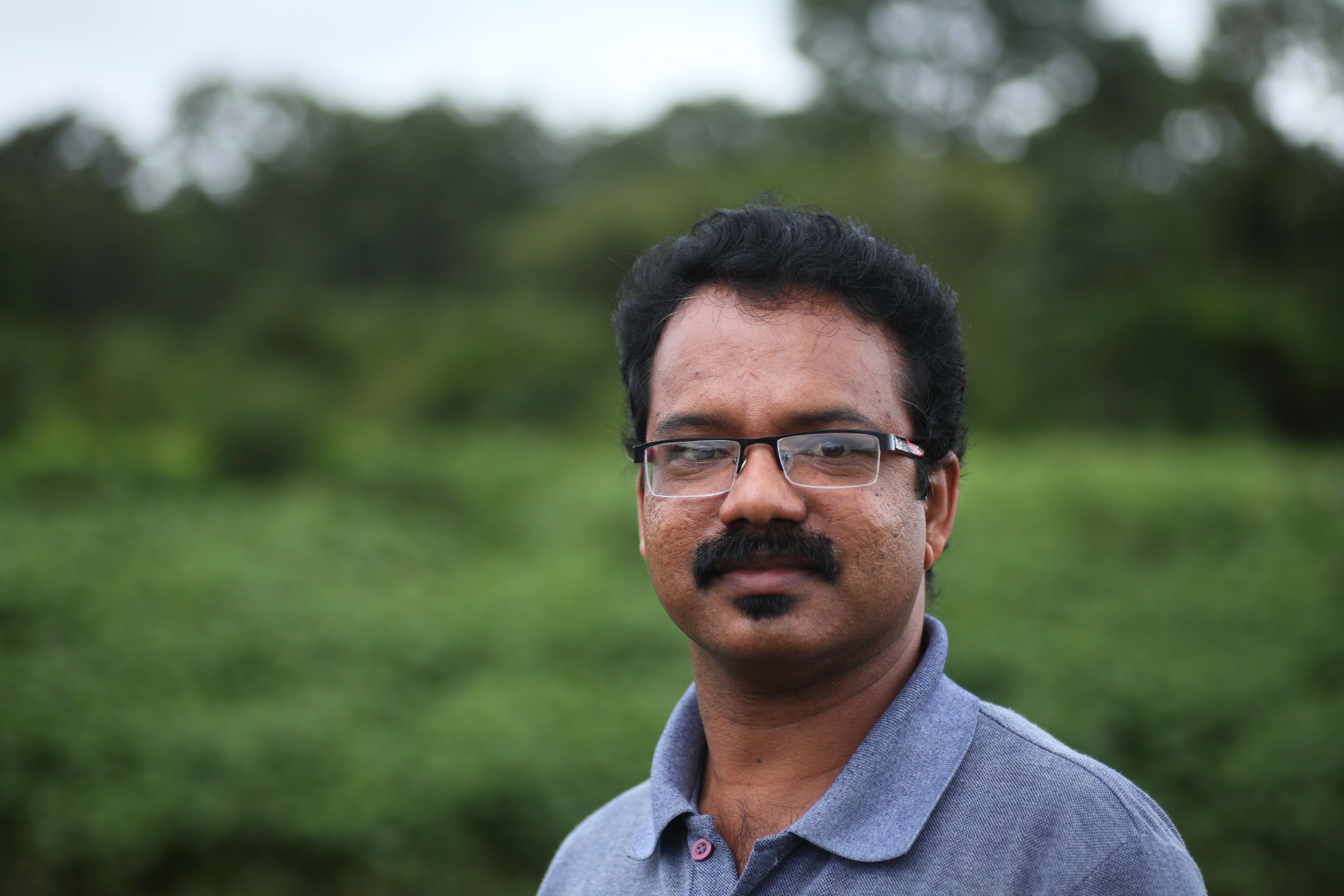
- Born: 1973 (age 52–53); Wayanad, Kerala

Sibi Pulpally is a photographer from Kerala, India. In 2009, he won the Kerala Lalithakala Academy Award for his photo Kaalukal urangunnilla (English: Legs never sleep). He worked as the researcher and one of the producer of documentary Have You Seen Arana? which has won several awards internationally. He also worked as the still photographer for the film Guda, the first film in the tribal language of the Kattunaikkars.

== Personal life ==
Sibi Pulpally was born in Pulpally, Wayanad district. He runs a photography studio called Sibees Studio in Pulpally. His photos were published by many media outlets and reputed academic institutions including Caravan, Leeds University and Princeton University.

== Awards ==
- Kerala Lalithakala Academy Award 2009
- Kerala State Photography Award 2019: Consolation Prize
- Kodamana Satyanath Photography Award by Premji Smaraka Samiti
- Victor George Award

== Solo exhibitions ==
- Sthree jeevitam (English:Women's Life): Lalithakala Academy Art Gallery, Mananthavadi, Wayanad
