= 2001 in Kerala =

- Centuries
- Decades: 1980s; 1990s; 2000s; 2010s; 2020s
- See also: List of years in Kerala; History of Kerala

Events in the year 2001 in Kerala.

== Incumbents ==
Governors of Kerala - Sukhdev Singh Kang

Chief minister of Kerala –

- E.K. Nayanar (till May)
- A. K. Antony (since May)

== Events ==
- January 6 - 2001 Aluva massacre
- February - A thirteen year old girl named Krishnapriya was raped and killed by a youth named Ahmed Koya near Manjeri.
- March 11 - Forty one passengers suffered death by burns following a bus accident at Pookkiparamba near Kottakkal.
- April 10 - A scientist killed due to explosion of a missile at Naval Armament Depot, Aluva.
- May 10 - 2001 Kerala Legislative Assembly election held.
- May 17 - Indian National Congress led United Democratic Front came into power in Kerala under the leadership of A. K. Antony.
- June 22 - Kadalundi train derailment in Malappuram district claims 59 lives.
- June 30 - Mavoor Gwalior Rayons factory shutdown following decades of environmental activism.
- August 29 - October 16 - C. K. Janu led Kudil Ketti Samaram before Kerala Government Secretariat.
- September 12 - Government of India notifies Minimum support price for Natural rubber belonging to higher grades.
- September 25 - Red rain in Kerala in Kottayam district.
- November 9 - A landslide at Amboori, Thiruvananthapuram district claims 39 lives.
- November 21 - Clinical services commenced in Malabar Cancer Centre, Thalassery.
- December 8 - Indian Federal Democratic Party headed by P. C. Thomas extends support to ruling National Democratic Alliance.

=== Dates unknowwn ===
- Third Antony ministry allows self financing colleges in Kerala for professional courses.

== Birth ==
- Mamitha Baiju
- 27 August - Esther Anil

== Deaths ==
- January 17 - P. R. Kurup, 85, politician.
- April 7 - G. N. Ramachandran, 78, Physicist
- July 9 - Victor George, 46, Photographer.

== See also ==
- History of Kerala
- 2001 in India
