= 1999 in Kerala =

- Centuries
- Decades: 1970s; 1980s; 1990s; 2000s; 2010s
- See also: List of years in Kerala; History of Kerala

Events in the year 1999 in Kerala.

== Incumbents ==
Governors of Kerala - Sukhdev Singh Kang

Chief minister of Kerala – E.K. Nayanar

== Events ==
- January 14 - Fifty three pilgrims killed in 1999 Sabarimala stampede.
- January 26 - Relay satyagraha by environmental activists at Kozhikode against Mavoor Gwalior Rayons Factory.
- June 10 - Commercial operations started from new Nedumbassery Airport at Kochi with an Air India flight to Dammam.
- August 25 - Communist Party of India (Marxist) leader P. Jayarajan suffered a near fatal physical attack by Rashtriya Swayamsevak Sangh workers at his home in Kadirur.
- September 11 - 1999 Indian general election took place in all 20 constituencies of Kerala.
- October 6 - United Democratic Front bagged 11 of the 20 parliamentary seats in 1999 Indian general election in Kerala.
- October 10 - Mavoor Rayons Factory stops production following 36 years long protests against pollution.
- November 11 - Kerala Infrastructure Investment Fund Board established.
- November 14 - Nineteen passengers were killed and 90 were injured in a bus accident near Poredam Kollam district.
- December 1 - A school teacher named K.T. Jayakrishnan Master who was a Rashtriya Swayamsevak Sangh worker hacked to death in front of students by Communist Party of India (Marxist) workers while he was teaching in Mokeri UP School at Kannur.

== Deaths ==
- January 8 - K.T. Achuthan, politician,87.
- April 10 - Thakazhi Sivasankara Pillai, writer and Jnanpith Award winner, 86.
- May 12 - Kalamandalam Kalyanikutty Amma, dancer, 84.

== See also ==
- History of Kerala
- 1999 in India
