= Anweshi Women's Counselling Centre =

Anweshi Women's Counselling Centre is a non-governmental organization based in Calicut district of Kerala, headed by former naxalite leader K. Ajitha. Anweshi has been involved with a challenging task of exposing one of the several `sex rackets’ in Kerala that trapped adolescent girls and young women in Kozhikode city.

The case popularly known as “The ice-cream parlor case” gained particular importance because of the involvement of influential politicians, government officials, powerful rich persons etc. Many influential suspects including politician “P.K. Kunhalikutty”, being politically and economically very powerful, were able to sabotage the investigation processes and the trial.

As a result, all the key victims/witnesses turned hostile. The prosecutor, who is supposed to protect the interests of the victims, did not make much effort to question the hostile witnesses and the judge also did not probe. The trial was stage managed and hastily concluded, in which the ultimate victim was justice itself. In the Ice Cream Parlour case, all the accused were released with the judge commenting that the prosecution could not prove the case.

Recently the case got attention when another important suspect “K. A. Rauf” came out with shocking details about the case including corruption and bureaucracy in the judicial system. This case is under investigation and a committee headed by Additional Director-General of Police (ADGP) Vinson M. Paul has been appointed by the State Government.
