= Nawab Rajendran =

Indian journalist (1950-2003)

- Born: T. A. Rajendran; 1950; Payyannur, Malabar District, Madras State (present day Kannur, Kerala), India
- Died: 10 October 2003 (aged 52–53)
- Other name: Nawab Rajendran
- Occupations: Social activist; Journalist
- Parents: Kunjirama Poduval; Bhargaviamma

Thekke Arangath Rajendran, popularly known as Nawab Rajendran (1950 – 10 October 2003), was an Indian social activist and journalist from Kerala. He was the founder of Nawab, a local newspaper, and was a popular litigant who, through his prolific use of public interest litigation, helped bring many cases into public notice for nearly three decades, including a number of cases against late K. Karunakaran, former Union Minister of Commerce and Industries and Chief Minister of Kerala. Nawab Rajendran: Oru Manushyavakasa Porattathinte Charithram, a biography by Kamalram Sajeev, details Rajendran's social activism.

== Biography ==
T. A. Rajendran was born in 1950 to Kunjirama Poduval and Bhargaviamma at Payyanur, in Kannur district in the South Indian state of Kerala. He started his career as a journalist by founding a local daily, under the title, Nawab and started publishing anti-corruption stories regularly which earned him enemies due to which he suffered several assaults and was remanded on many occasions. Soon, unable to stand against the opposition, he had to close down the daily permanently. However, the daily earned him the moniker Nawab Rajendran. Subsequently, he resorted to the use of public interest litigations to fight against corruption and social injustices and filed many cases against prominent personalities, starting with the infamous Thattil Estate Murder case against K. Karunakaran. He was involved in a number of cases against K. Karunakaran and his biography details the encounters, including allegations about how the political leader used the services of Jayaram Padikkal, then Deputy Inspector General of Kerala Police, took away documents supposedly incriminating K. Karunakaran.

Rajendran, mostly seen in public wearing a knee-length kurtha and carrying a cotton shoulder bag, was diagnosed with cancer towards the later part of his life. On 10 October 2003, he was found unconscious in a lodge and was declared dead on arrival at the hospital. His body was cremated against his wish to donate his body to a medical college and the action of the authorities also generated public criticism.

Rajandran once received an award for his social activism which carried a cash prize of ₹200,000 of which he donated ₹190,000 to the General Hospital, Ernakulam. The amount was used to form a charitable organisation, The Manawa Seva Trust, and the organisation collected additional funds to build a modern mortuary complex at the hospital.

== In popular culture ==
Vakkalathu Narayanankutty, a 2001 Malayalam film featuring Jayaram, was loosely based on Rajendran's life. His life has been documented by Kamalram Sajeev, in a biographical work, Nawab Rajendran: Oru Manushyavakasa Porattathinte Charithram, published in 2015. A tele film, Nawab Rajendran, has been made by Mandhath Creations, which is a documentary on Rajendran's life.

== See also ==
- List of persons from Kerala
