= Kabanigiri =

Village in Kerala, India

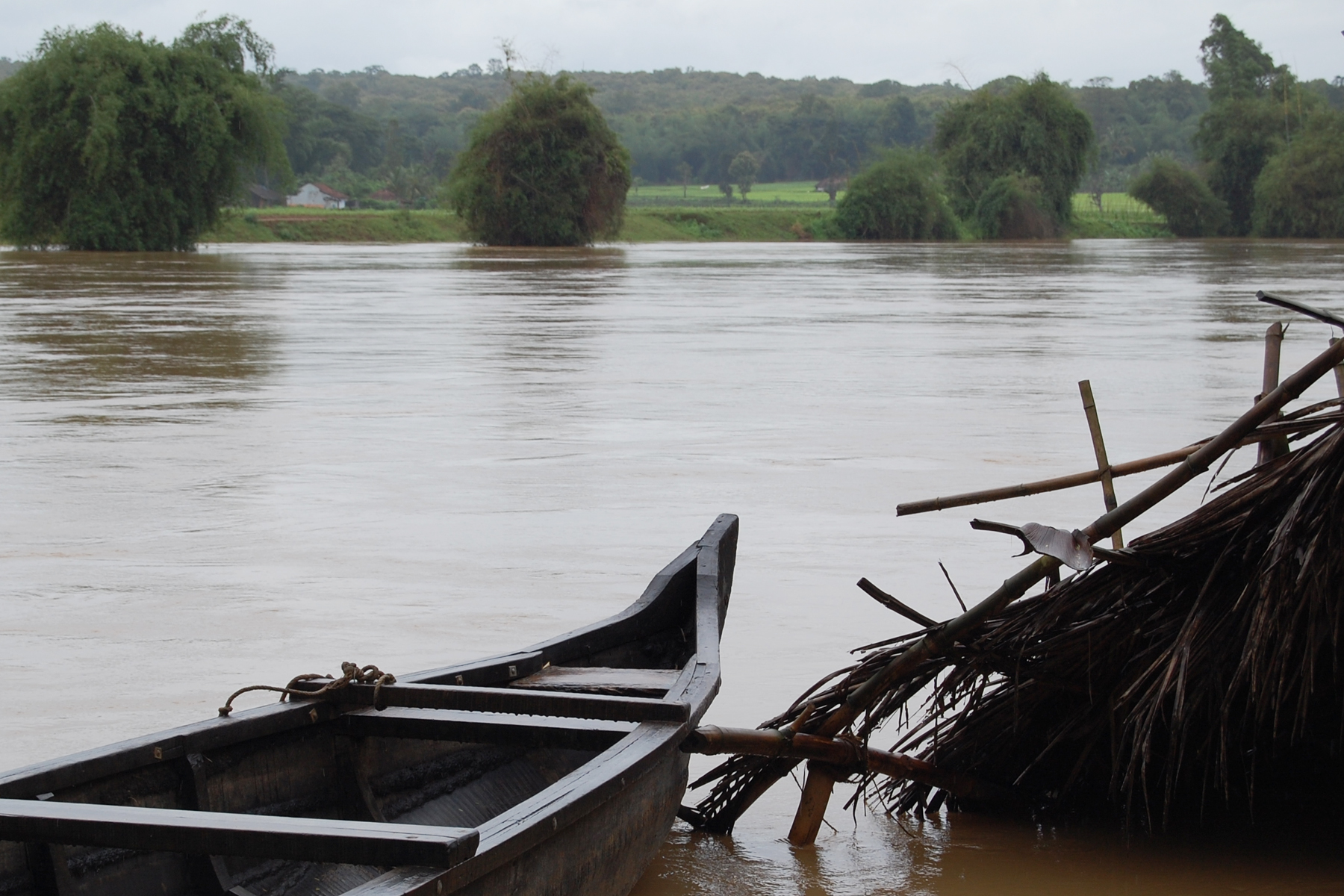
Kabani River

Kabanigiri is a village near Pulpally, Wayanad district. It is one of the nearest places to Kabani River.

== Kabanigiri Ferry ==
The Kabanigiri river ferry takes the villagers from Kabanigiri village in Kerala to D.B.Kuppe village in Karnataka. Machur town can also be accessed by the same ferry.

== Transportation ==
Kabanigiri can be accessed from Pulpally town near Mananthavady. The Periya ghat road connects Mananthavady to Kannur and Thalassery. The Thamarassery mountain road connects Calicut with Kalpetta. The Kuttiady mountain road connects Vatakara with Kalpetta and Mananthavady. The Palchuram mountain road connects Kannur and Iritty with Mananthavady. The road from Nilambur to Ooty is also connected to Wayanad through the village of Meppadi.

The nearest railway station is at Mysore and the nearest airports are Kozhikode International Airport-120 km, Bengaluru International Airport-290 km, and Kannur International Airport, 58 km.

== Image Gallery ==
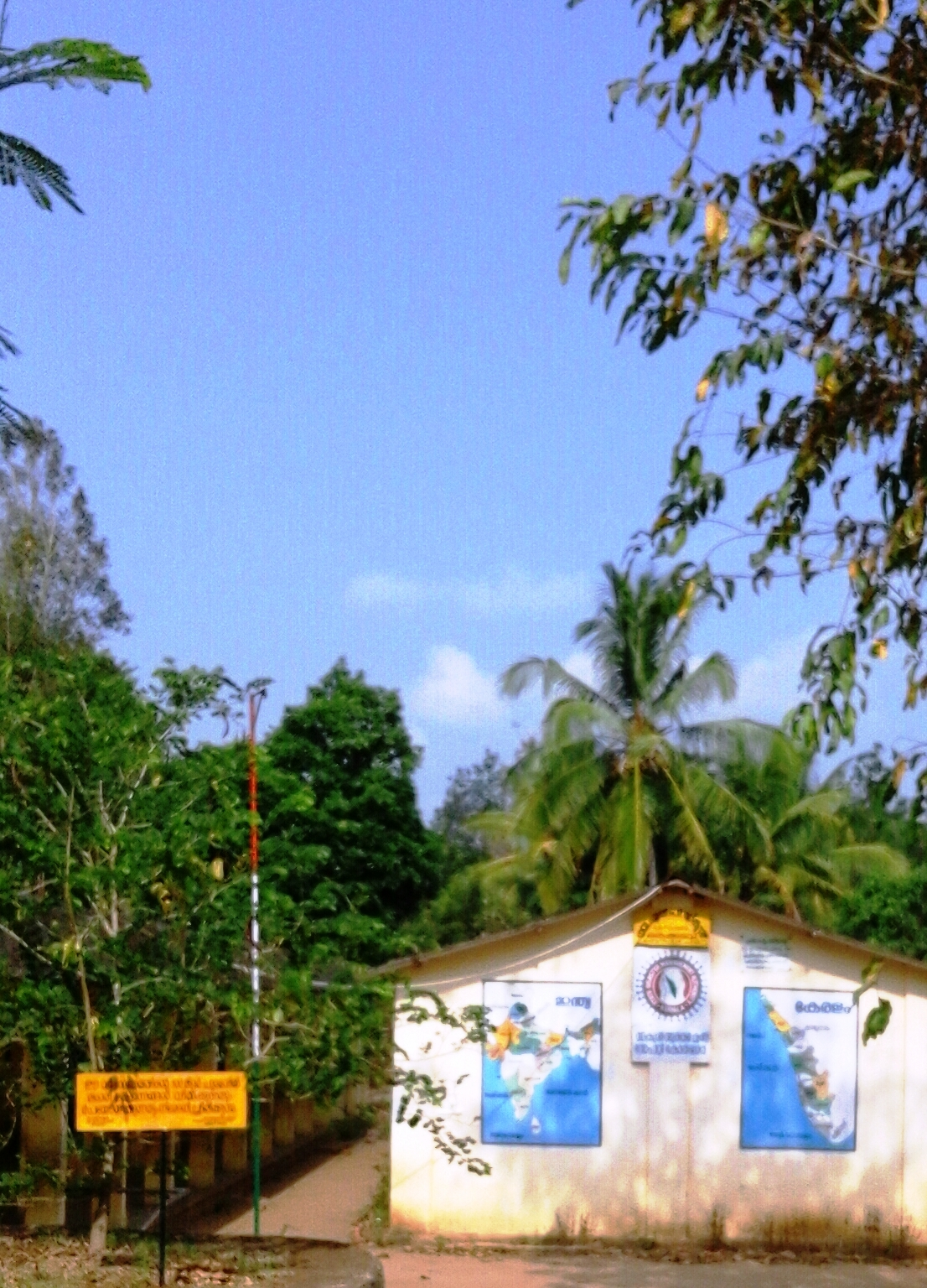
Kabanigiri school

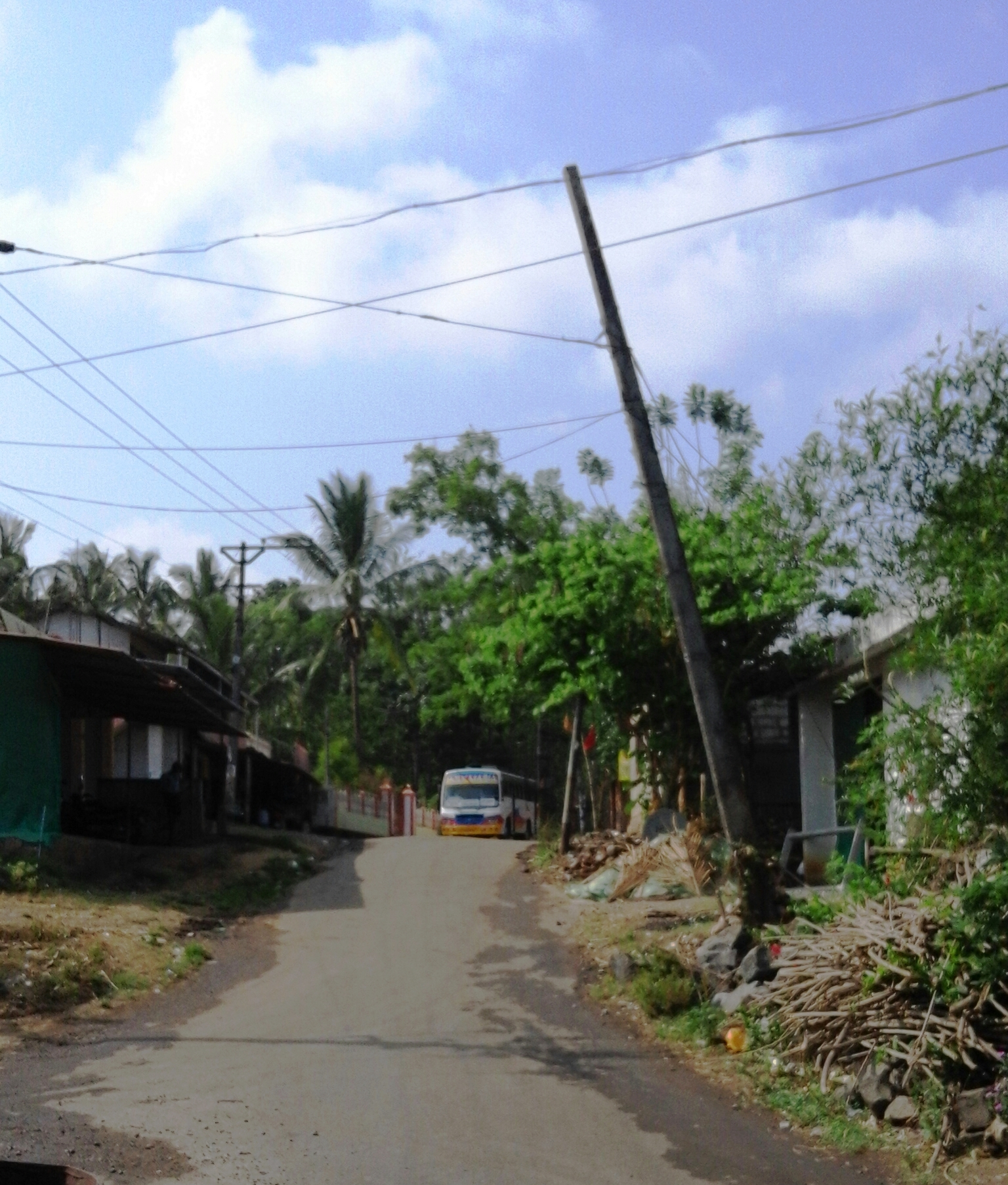
Kabanigiri town
