= Kunnikkal Narayanan =

Indian Naxalite activist

Kunnikkal Narayanan was one of the front-runners of the Naxalite movement in Kerala, India. His wife was Mandakini Narayanan (died 16 December 2006 aged 83). Narayanan, along with his wife and daughter, led several agitations waged by Naxalites in Kerala. He was arrested and sent to jail in the Pulpally and Thalassery police stations attack cases, which resulted in death of two police officials.

Narayanan was survived by his daughter K. Ajitha, Naxalite turned human rights activist and social reformer. Ajitha now champions the cause of women's rights and fights against social evils and corruption through an organization named ANWESHI.
