= Kumili =

- village
- Interactive map of Kumili
- Location in Andhra Pradesh, India
- Coordinates: 18°06′59″N 83°30′43″E
- Country: India
- State: Andhra Pradesh

Languages
  - Official: Telugu
- Time zone: UTC+5:30 (IST)
- PIN: 535204
- Vidhan Sabha constituency: Nellimarla Assembly constituency

Kumili is a historical village and panchayat in Pusapatirega mandal of Vizianagaram district, Andhra Pradesh, India.

== History ==
Kumili was the former seat of the erstwhile Vizianagaram Kingdom (later Vizianagaram estate). Ruins of this mud fort still exist here.

Kumili village's former name was Kumbilapuram. Vizianagaram Kingdom was first established in this village and they build a mud fort here. Later moved their capital to near by village Potnur and finally they established in Vizianagaram by building new fort and moved their capital there.

In 1607 Trailanga Swami was born.

== Demographics ==
The village has a population of 5,929 and about 1,300 houses in 2001. Males constitutes 2,991 and Females 2938 of the population.
