= Thinkalkarikkakom =

Thingalkarikkom pezhum moode(old name)
- village
- Interactive map of Thingalkarikkom
- Country: India
- State: Kerala
- District: Kollam

Population (2011)
  - Total: 18,790

Languages
  - Official: Malayalam, English
- Time zone: UTC+5:30 (IST)
- PIN: 691310
- Telephone code: 0475
- Vehicle registration: KL-
- Nearest city: anchal

Thingalkarikkom is a village in Kollam district in the state of Kerala, India.

In 1997, Government of Kerala took over possession of 94 acres land in this village which was illegally held by Thangal Kunju Musaliar. The Arippa land struggle that started in 2012 was surrounding land rights for Dalits from this parcel of land.

== Demographics ==
As of 2011 India census, Thinkalkarikkakom had a population of 18790 with 8755 males and 10035 females.
