= Ayinoor Vasu =

Political Leader

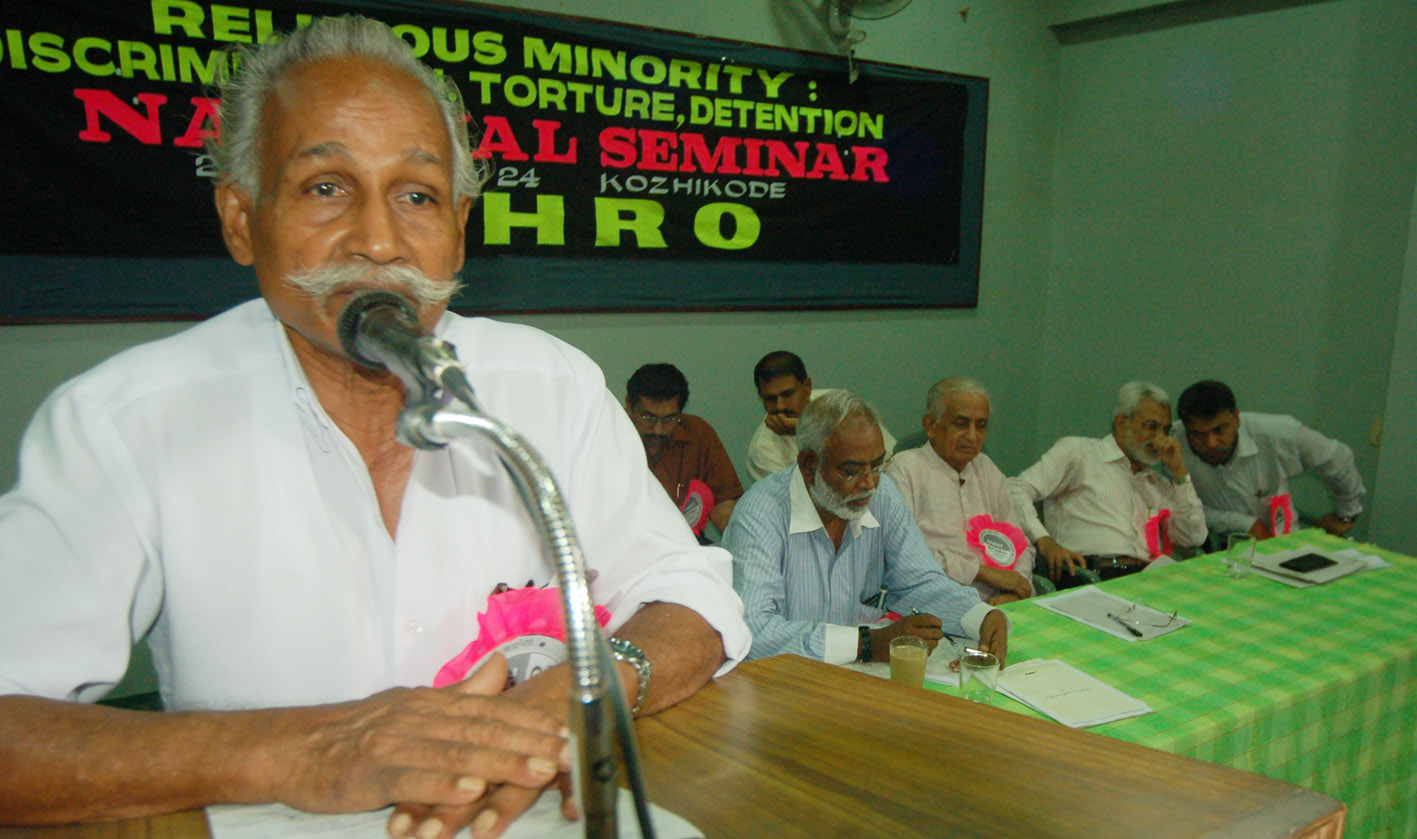
Grow Vasu during a meeting at Kozhikode.

Ayinoor Vasu (GROW Vasu) (born 1930) is a Human rights activist and trade unionist in Kerala, India.

== Biography ==
Mr. A. Vasu is also an environmental activist. He is well known for his bold stands in the fight for justice for Dalits, Tribals and minority communities. He was the first public figure in Kerala to take a stand against the arrest of Abdul Nazer Mahdani.

He began working in the Commonwealth Trust Weaving Mill in Kozhikode at the age of 16 in 1946. He has participated in many social and human rights activities and got arrested many times. The leader of Ayinoor Vasu was one of the biggest labour movements in Kerala. In 2019 he signed a joint human right statement for the release of Student Activist Rinshad Reera.

== Personal life ==
Grow Vasu was one of the forefront leaders in the Thirunelli Naxalite action in 1970 in which Varghese, a Naxalite leader was killed. Following this he was imprisoned at the Kannur Central Prison for seven years. After being released from jail, many refused to offer him employment because he was a Naxalite. To subsist, he made and sold umbrellas, a craft he learned in 1955 to raise funds for buying a band set for the Communist Party in Kozhikode.
