= Ice cream parlour sex scandal =

Political sex scandal in India

The ice cream parlour sex scandal is a long running sex scandal that rocked the Indian National Congress-led UDF government following a complaint by a Kozhikode-based NGO, Anweshi that an ice cream parlour was being run as a brothel and a number of girls were being sexually exploited there.

Former Chief Minister VS Achuthanandan has alleged in his petition that the then state government is not making any serious effort to bring the accused to book as several influential persons including its sitting Minister for Industries and Information Technology PK Kunhalikutty is said to be involved in the racket.

In his appeal Achuthanandan, stated that KA Rauf, co-brother of Kunhalikutty, made a disclosure at a press conference on 28 January 2011 that the minister had influenced several key witnesses in the sex scandal to turn hostile for pecuniary benefits.

On the basis of the said disclosure, Kerala police registered a fresh case on 30 January 2011 and on 2 February, a Special Investigation Team was constituted, to probe the claim, said the plea by former state CM.

The case diary relating to the "ice cream parlour sabotage case" indicated that Indian Union Muslim League leader and Industries Minister P K Kunhalikutty tried to influence witnesses in his favour. As per the investigation report, witnesses have in their statements to police alleged Kunhalikutty tried to persuade them to change their original depositions in his favour. They said they had also received financial benefits to retract from their earlier statements which went against Kunalikutty, through his relative K A Rauf.Though Kunhalikutty never became an accused in the case, he had come under a cloud in the wake of the scandal and had to quit a ministry then. In addition, accusations have been made that UDF government has deliberately obstructed progress in the investigation in order to protect themselves, relatives, or friends.
