= Jayaram Padikkal =

IPS officer (1937–1997)

R. Jayaram Padikkal
- Born: 1 May 1937; Peruvemba village Palghat, Malabar district, British India
- Died: 15 July 1997 (aged 60); Thiruvananthapuram, Kerala, India
- Occupation: IPS Officer - Director General of Police (DGP)
- Children: 1

R. Jayaram Padikkal was an Indian Police Service officer. He served as the Director General of Police (DGP), the highest rank in the force, from 1993 to 1994.

== Early years ==
Jayaram Padikkal was born in Peruvemba village Palghat in Kerala as the son of an Indian Army officer and had his education in Pune. He was said to be a good hockey player and a voracious reader, especially history, crime and philosophy and later joined the Indian Police Service.

In 1982 he was made the Deputy Inspector General of Police (DIG), for the state of Kerala and thus became the youngest DIG in the country. He was one of the few Indian Police officers to have received training at the Scotland Yard. He was a recipient of President's Police Medal.

== Controversy ==
When he was Deputy Inspector General (Crime Branch) of Kerala police, he and Sub inspector Pulikkodan Narayanan were accused of complicity in the torture and death of a student named Rajan at the hands of the police during the period of The Emergency. He was convicted but the conviction was overturned on appeal. He was known to maintain a good relationship with the then Kerala Chief minister K. Karunakaran.

In 1972, as District Superintendent of Police at Thrissur, Padikkal was involved in brutally assaulting Nawab Rajendran and destroying his press office. Its alleged that the attack was in retaliation to Nawab Rajendran's investigative journalism scoop against corruption done by then Home Minister K. Karunakaran in the land acquisition for setting up Kerala Agricultural University at Mannuthy.

A book about his life and career, called The Crime Diary of Jayaram Padikkal, was written by Venganoor Balakrishnan in 1997. It describes him as "a NOTORIOUS and controversial IPS officer from Kerala, India."

External image
- Picture of Jayaram Padikkal, from keralapolicehistory.com retrieved 2.06.2012

He died in the same year, after falling ill. Before that, he was attacked by some militants on his way from Ernakulam Town railway station to his home nearby.

== In media ==
A main character of 2018 film Kaattu Vithachavar.

== Popular culture ==
In 2006, the play Ormakal Zindabad ( (Long Live Memories) directed by G. Ajayan and staged by the socio-cultural organization 'Silence' under the leadership of C.R. Neelakandan, was staged at the Fine Arts Hall, Ernakulam on August 29, based on the custodial death of Rajan. The leading characters were portrayed by Salih Rawther as Jayaram Padikkal and Shabu Madhavan as Rajan.

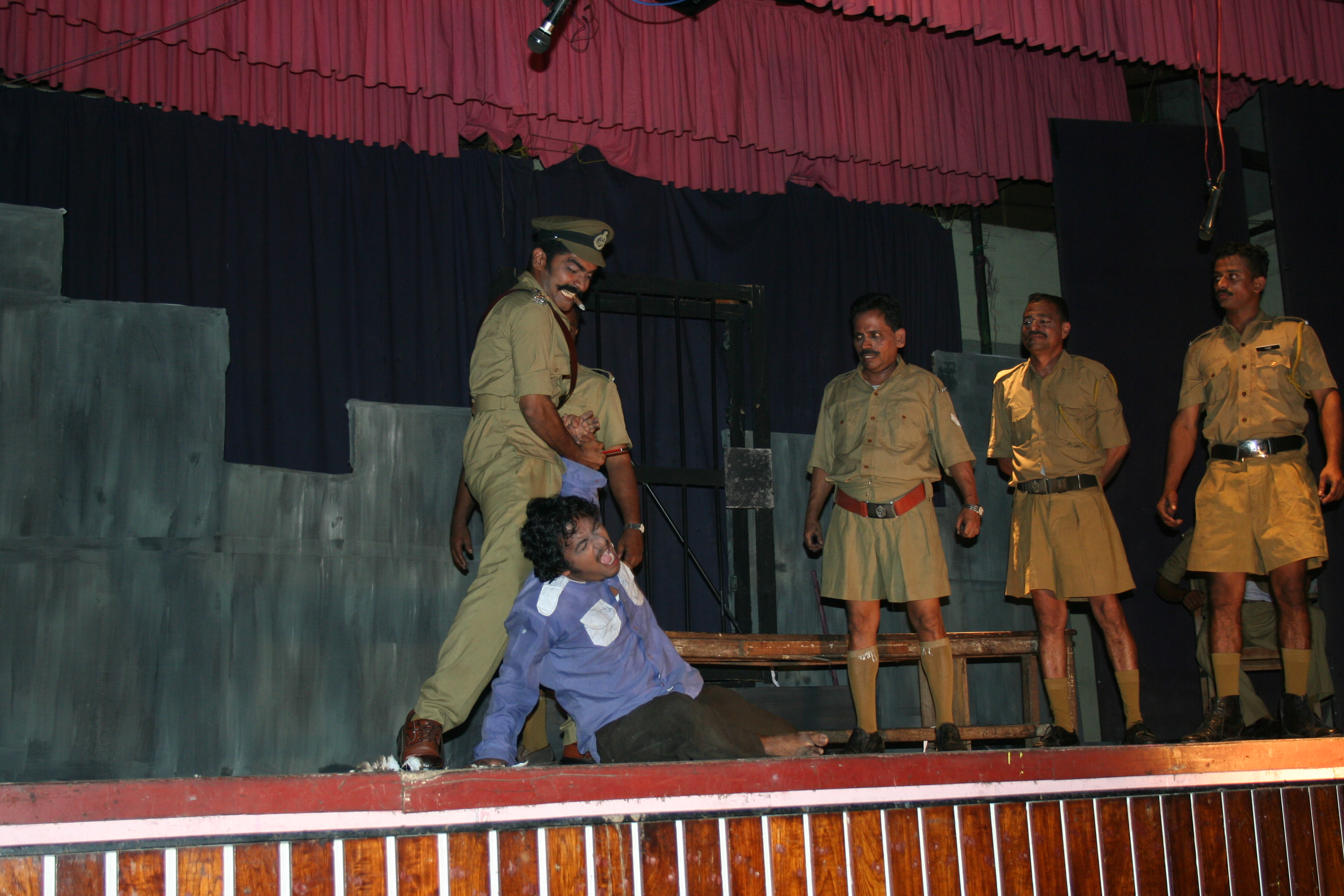
Ormakal zindabad drama
