= Pulpally =

Town in Kerala, India

- Village
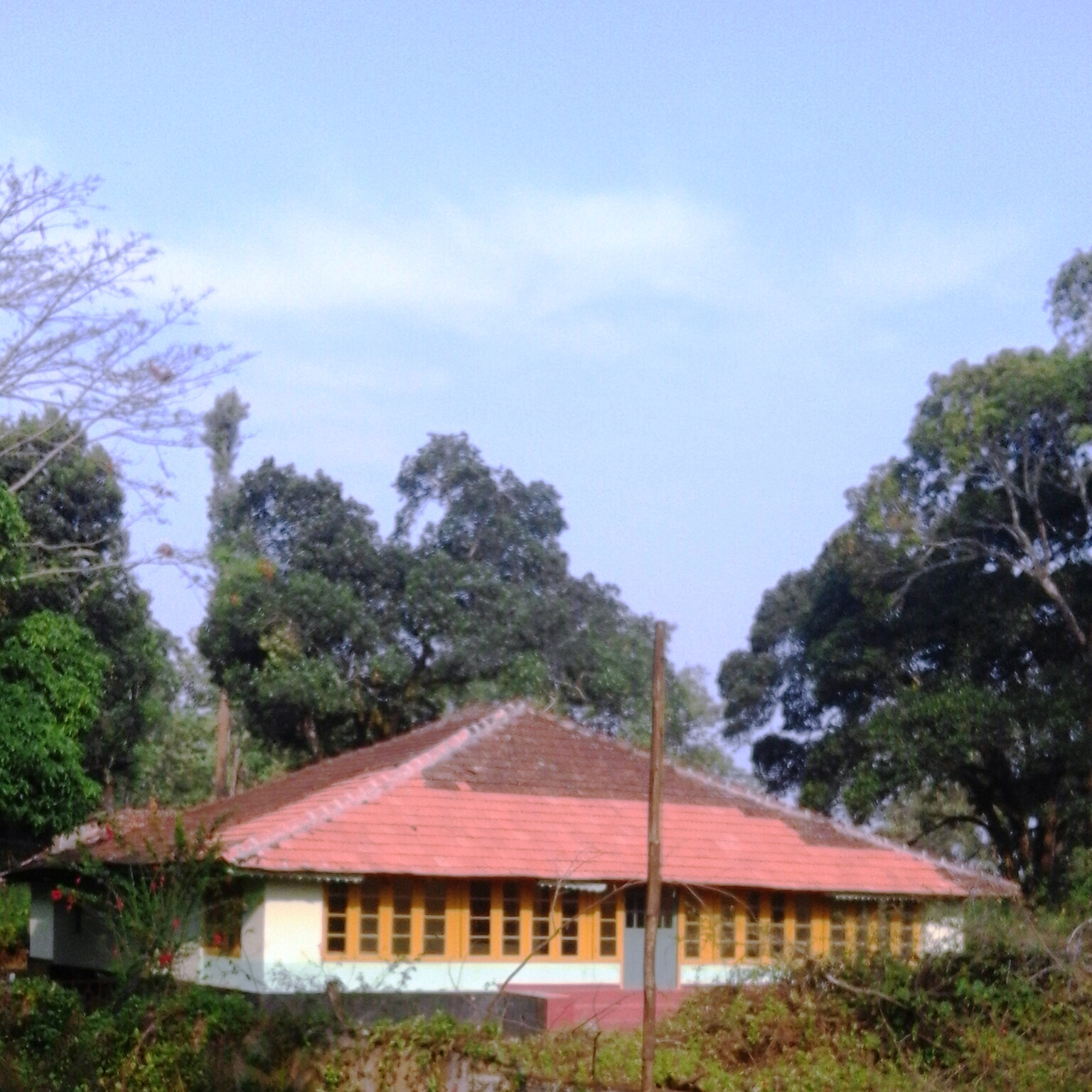
- Elephant Squad office, Kuppady

- Location in Kerala, India Pulpally (India)
- Coordinates: 11.793°N 76.165°E
- Country: India
- State: Kerala
- District: Wayanad

Government
  - Type: Grama Panchayat

Area
  - Total: 76.72 km^{2} (29.62 sq mi)
- Elevation: 742.5 m (2,436 ft)

Population (2011)
  - Total: 28,322
  - Density: 369.2/km^{2} (956.1/sq mi)

Languages
  - Official: Malayalam, English
- Time zone: UTC+5:30 (IST)
- PIN: 673579
- ISO 3166 code: IN-KL
- Vehicle registration: KL-73

Pulpally is a town in the Wayanad District of Kerala, India. Pulpally is also known as 'The land of black gold'. It is in Sultan Bathery Taluk and a Grama Panchayat under the local self-governance system. It is about 24 km from Sultan Bathery, and is almost surrounded by forest. The main source of income is agriculture.

== Image gallery ==
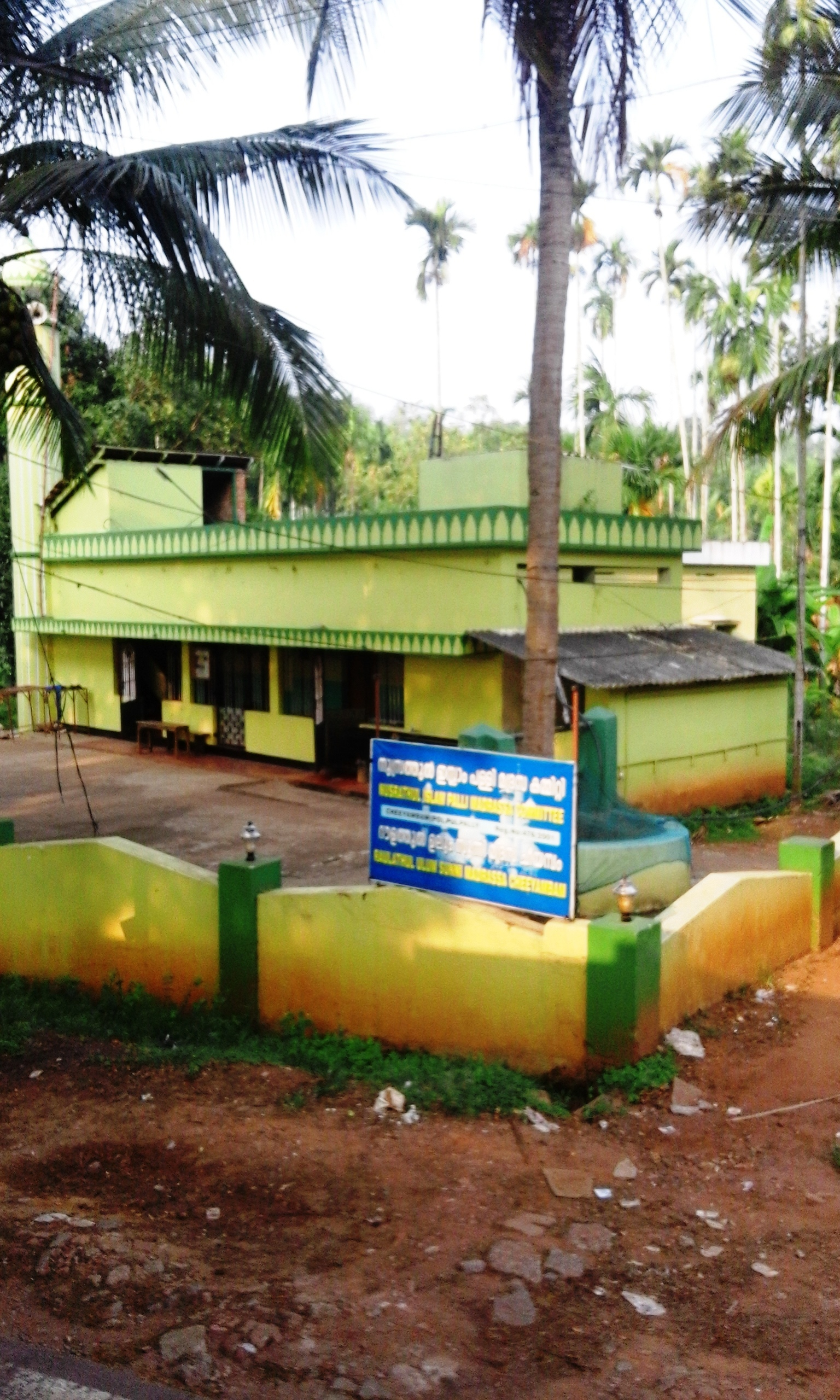
Cheeyambam Mosque

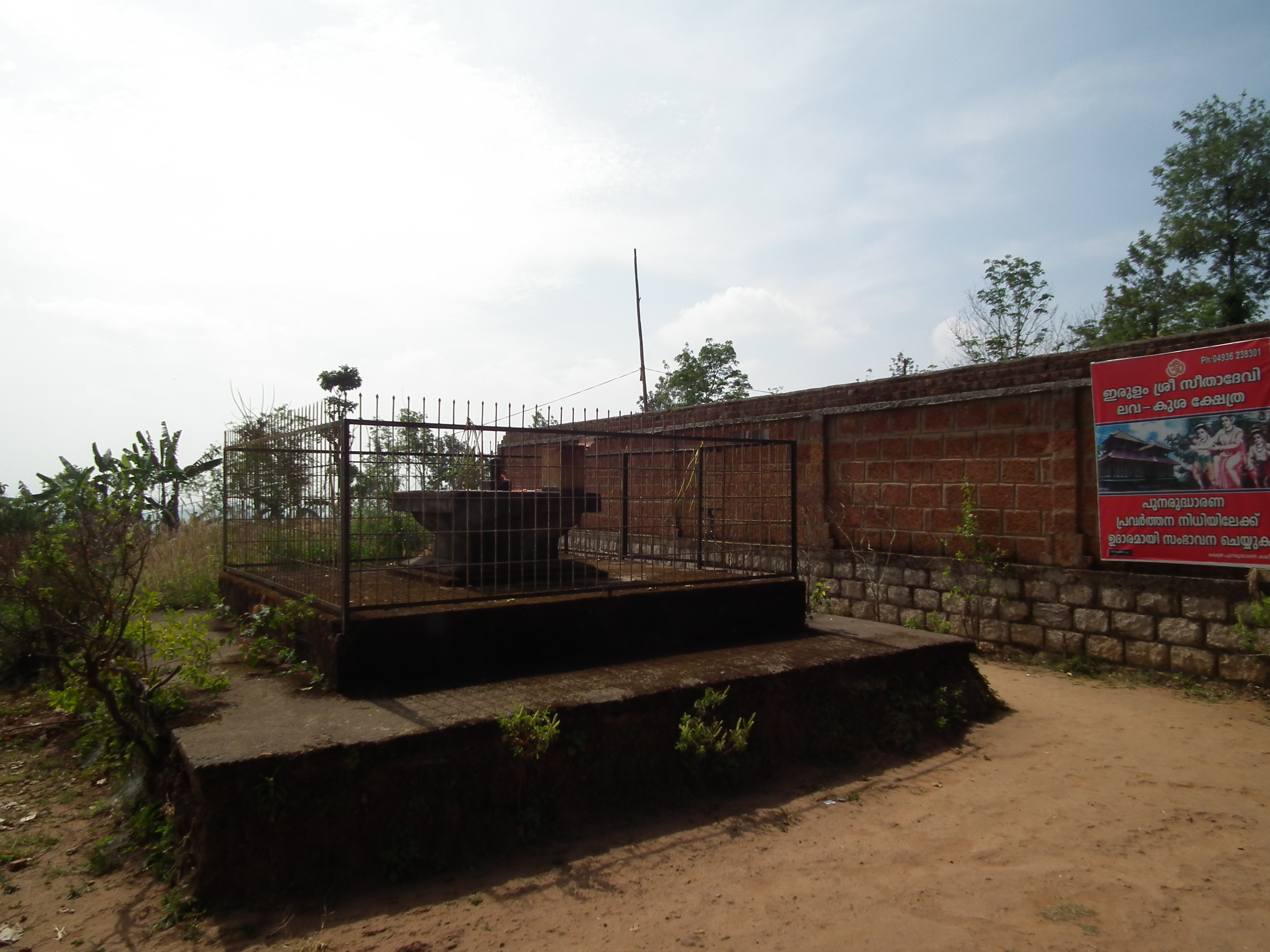
Mandapam

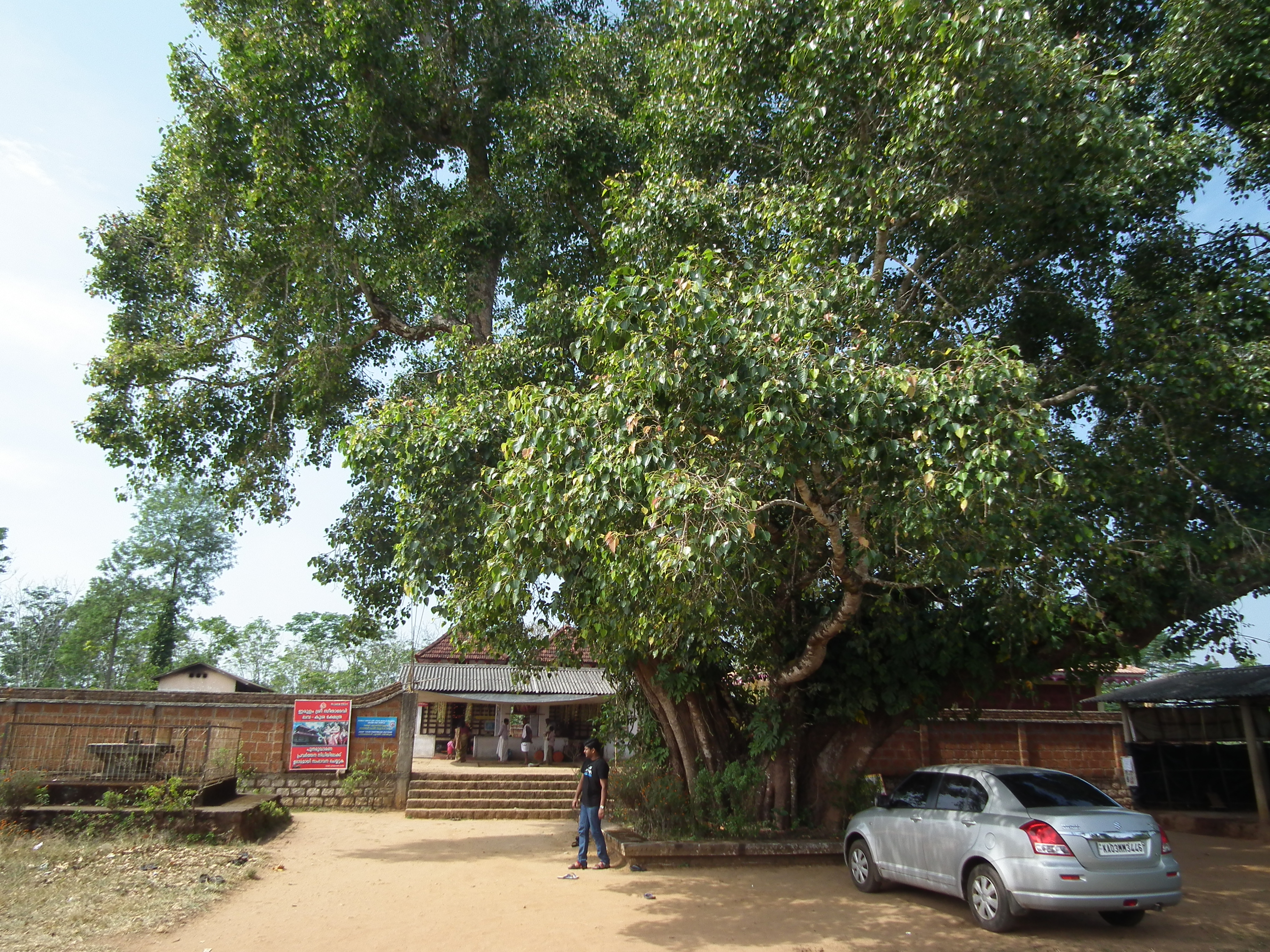
Sacred Tree

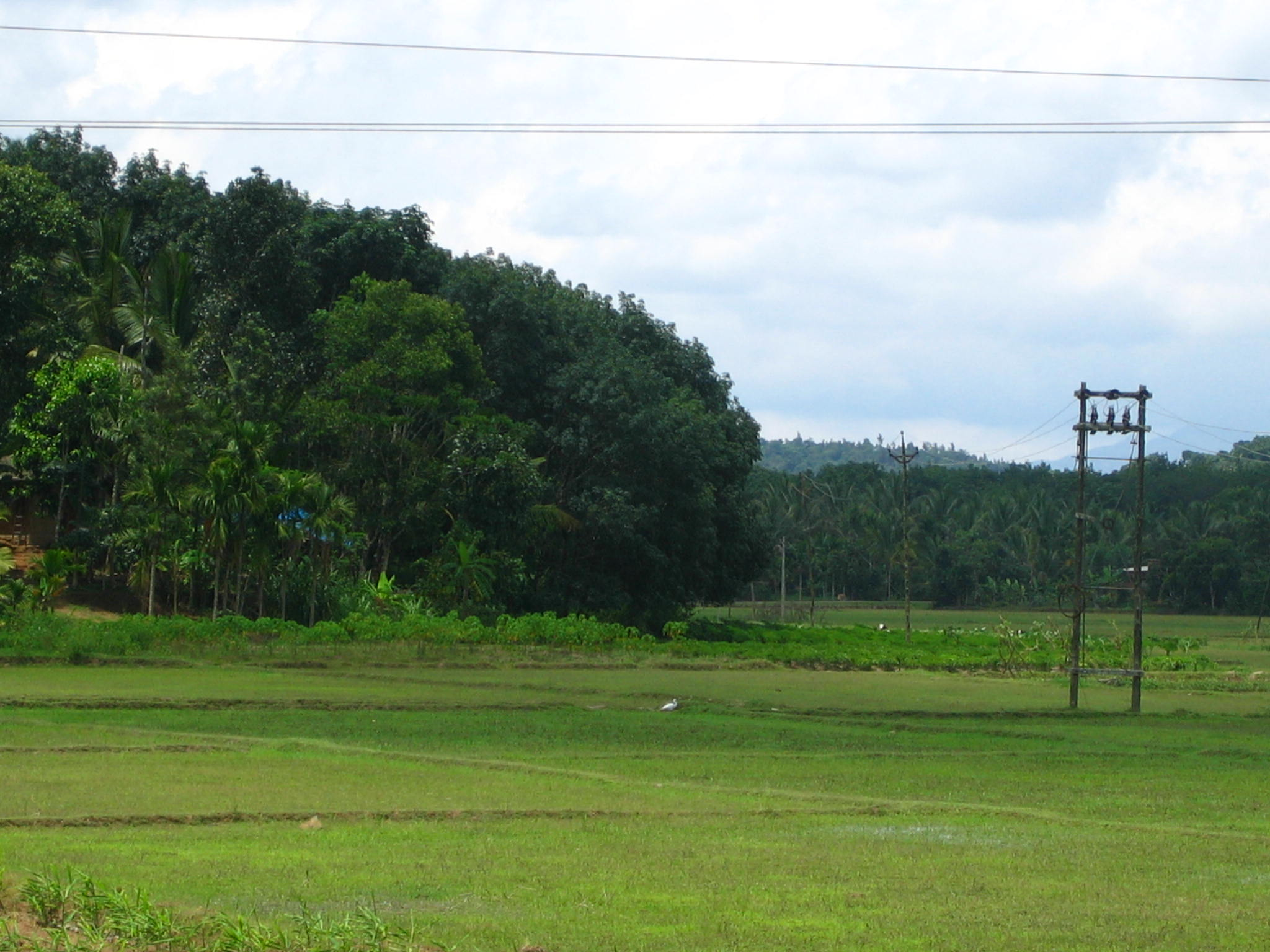
Oorpally, Payyampally

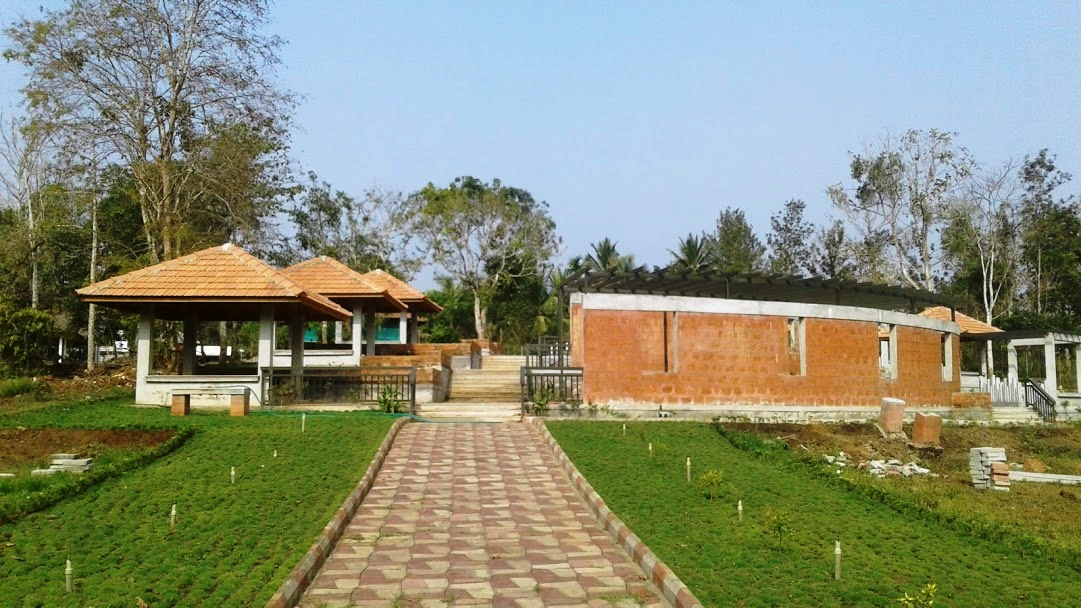
Pazhashi Memorial, Madappallikkunnu

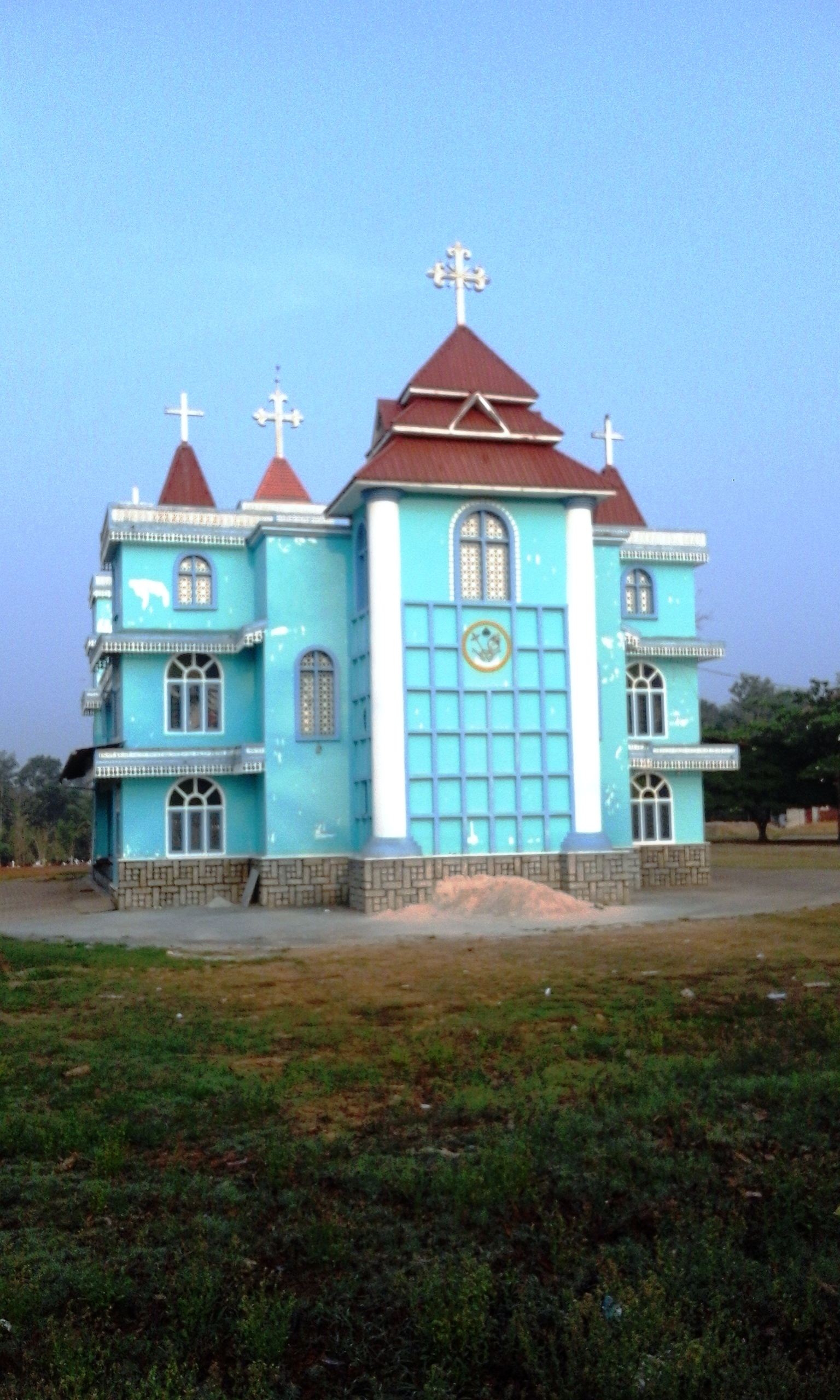
Simhasana Cathedral

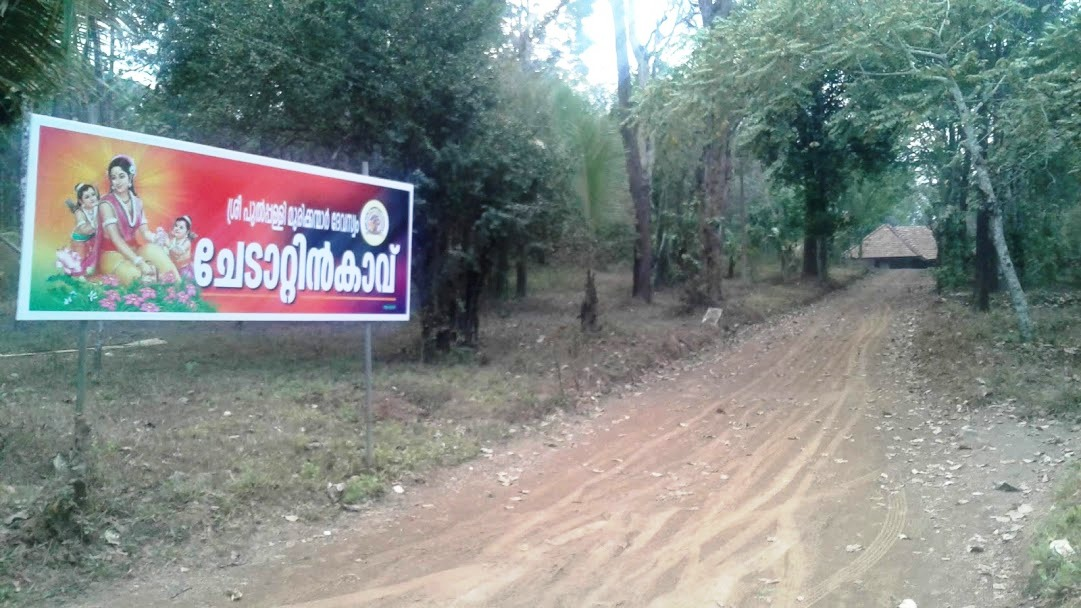
Kavu in Pulpally

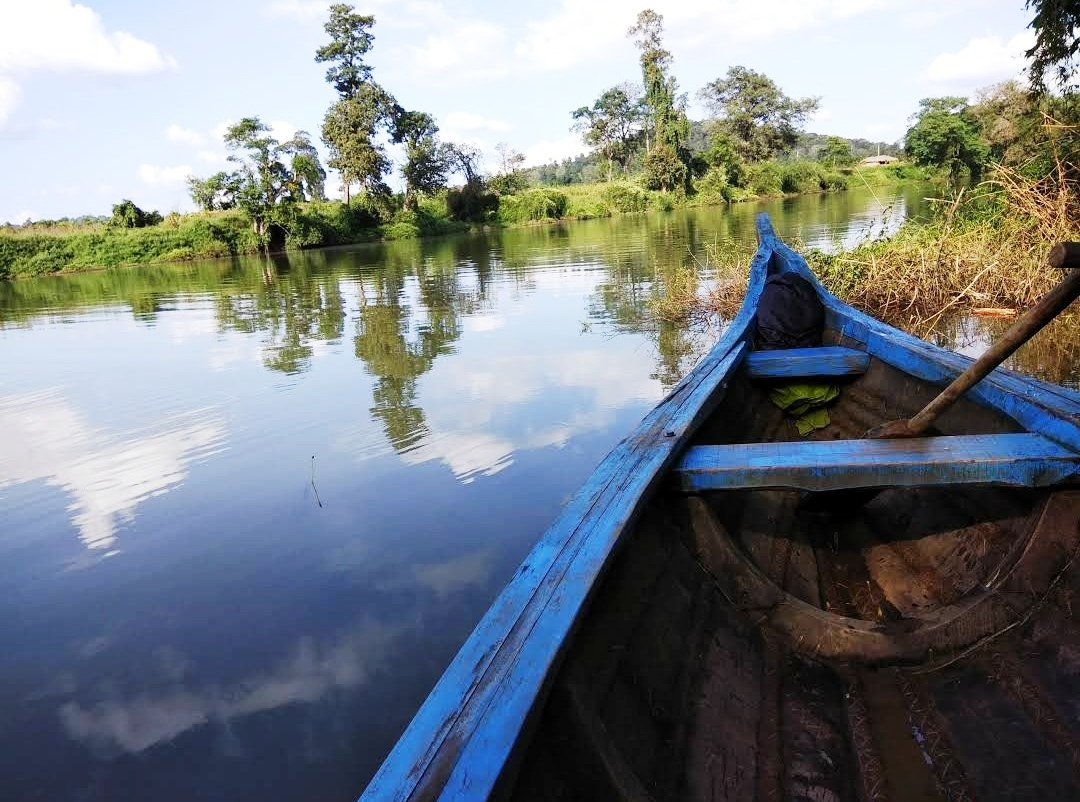
Marakkadavu Kabini river

== Sources ==
- Kurup, K. K. N. (1980), Pazhassi Samarangal
