= Sukhdev Singh Kang =

Indian judge and politician (1931–2012)

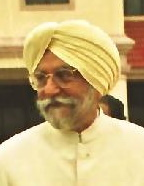

Governor of Kerala
- In office 25 January 1997 – 18 April 2002
- Preceded by: Mohammed Fazal
- Succeeded by: Sikander Bakht

Personal details
- Born: 15 May 1931
- Died: 12 October 2012 (aged 81) Chandigarh
- Awards: Padma Shri (1974)

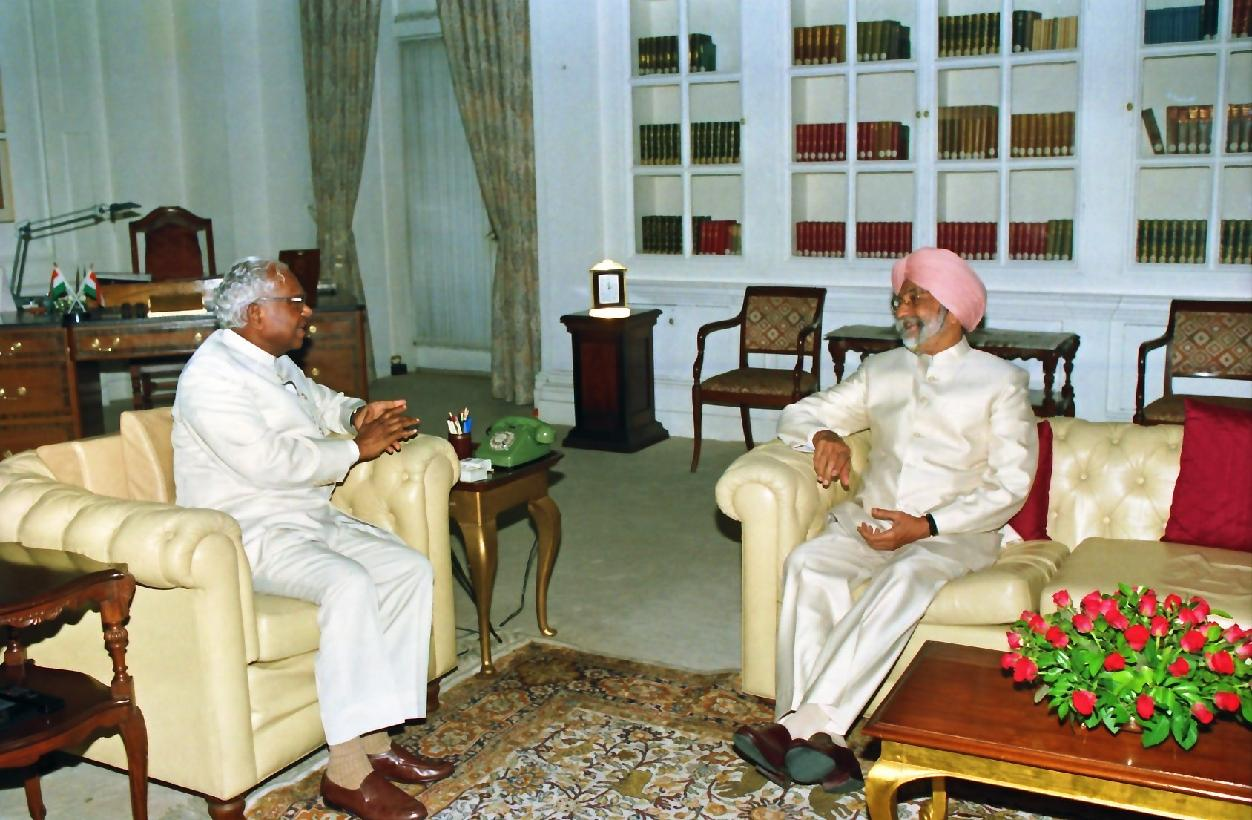
Indian President K. R. Narayanan meeting with Kerala Governor S. S. Kang at the Rashtrapati Bhavan

Sukhdev Singh Kang ( 15 May 1931 – 12 October 2012) was the fourteenth Governor of Kerala from 25 January 1997 to 18 April 2002. He served as a judge of the Punjab and Haryana High Court from 19 February 1979 till 23 October 1989 and was subsequently promoted and transferred as the Chief Justice of the Jammu and Kashmir High Court, a post he held from 24 October 1989 to 14 May 1993. During his tenure as Kerala governor, E K Nayanar and A K Antony were the Chief Ministers of Kerala. Following his stint as the Governor of Kerala, he was appointed a member of the National Human Rights Commission 1993. He then retired.

Kang died in Chandigarh on 12 October 2012 after a long illness. He was 81.
