= Tangasseri Lighthouse =

Lighthouse in Kerala, India

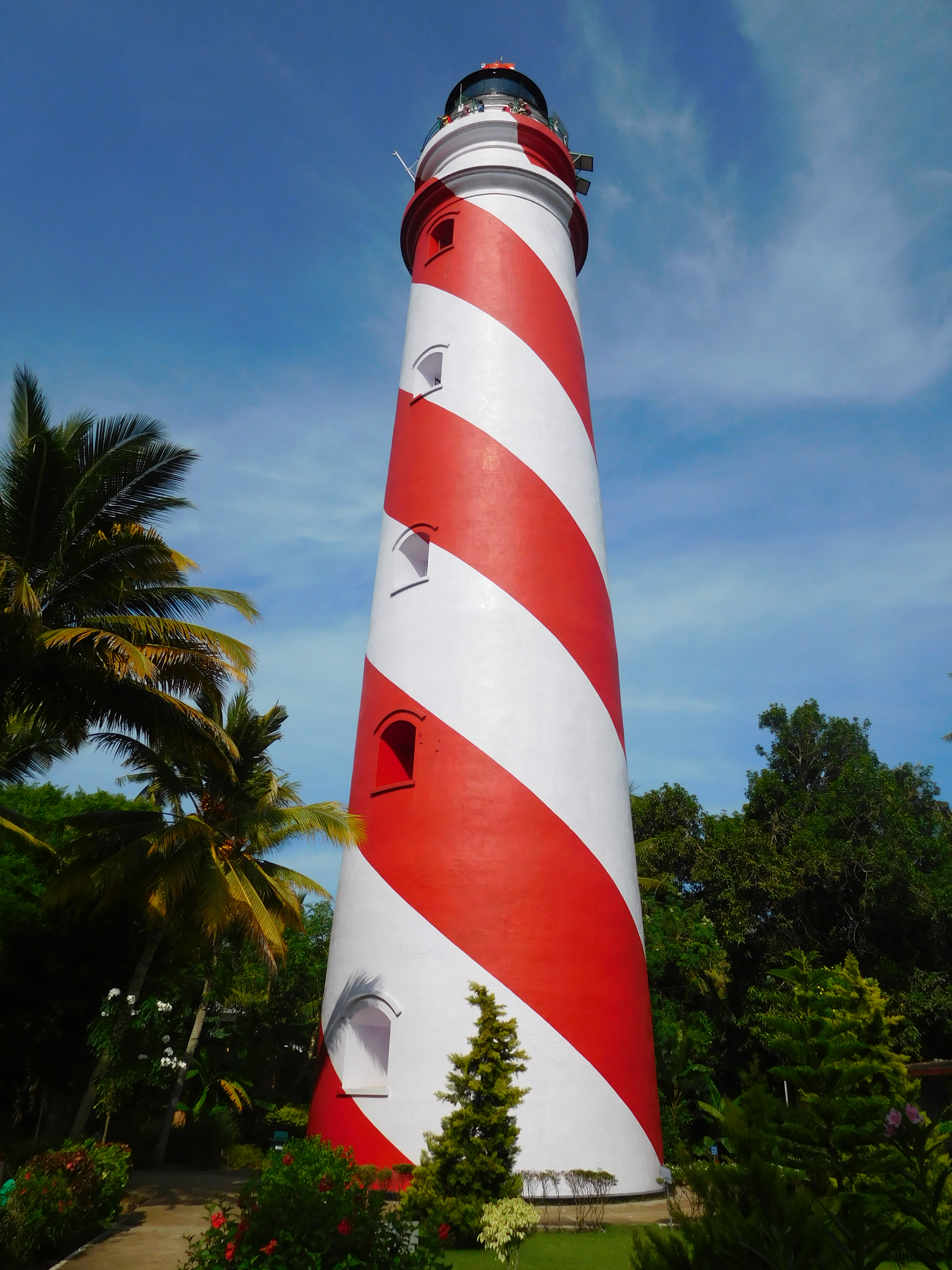
- The lighthouse in 2017
- Location: Tangasseri, Kollam, India
- Coordinates: 8°52′50″N 76°33′57″E

Tower
- Constructed: 1902
- Foundation: reinforced concrete
- Construction: masonry tower
- Height: 41 metres (135 ft)
- Shape: cylindrical tower with double balcony and lantern
- Markings: red and white diagonal stripe

Light
- Focal height: 42 metres (138 ft) above mean sea level
- Lens: 700 mm 2nd order 3 panel revolving optic inside 3.65 m diameter Lantern House (Chance Bros)
- Intensity: 1,27,950 CDS (220/250 volt) AC 400W X 3 nos. (Metal Halide Lamps)
- Range: 26 nautical miles (48 km; 30 mi)
- Characteristic: Fl (3) W 15s.

Tangasseri Lighthouse or Thangassery Lighthouse is situated at Tangasseri in Kollam city of the Indian state of Kerala. It is one of the two lighthouses in the Kollam Metropolitan Area and is maintained by the Cochin Directorate General of Lighthouses and Lightships. In operation since 1902, the cylindrical lighthouse tower painted with white and red oblique bands has a height of 41 metres (135 ft), making it the second tallest lighthouse in Kerala coast. Tangasseri Lighthouse is one of the most visited lighthouses in Kerala.

== History ==
Prior to construction of the lighthouse, the British East India company had installed a tower with an oil lamp. In 1902 the present Tangasseri Lighthouse was completed, which by 1930 had suffered cracks in the tower that required jacketing masonry to be installed. The light source was modified in 1932, 1940, 1962, 1967, 1990 and 1994.

In 2016, the Tangasseri Lighthouse got an elevator facility for its visitors.

== Location ==
The lighthouse is located on the coast at Tangasseri in Kollam city and is one of the locations in India that still maintains Anglo-Indian culture. Tangasseri is home to remnants of an ancient Portuguese built coastal defence, the St Thomas Fort, a Portuguese Cemetery, a canal, the ancient Port of Quilon and the Infant Jesus Cathedral.

Visitors are allowed access to the lighthouse between 11 am and 5 pm on all days except on Mondays.

== Gallery ==
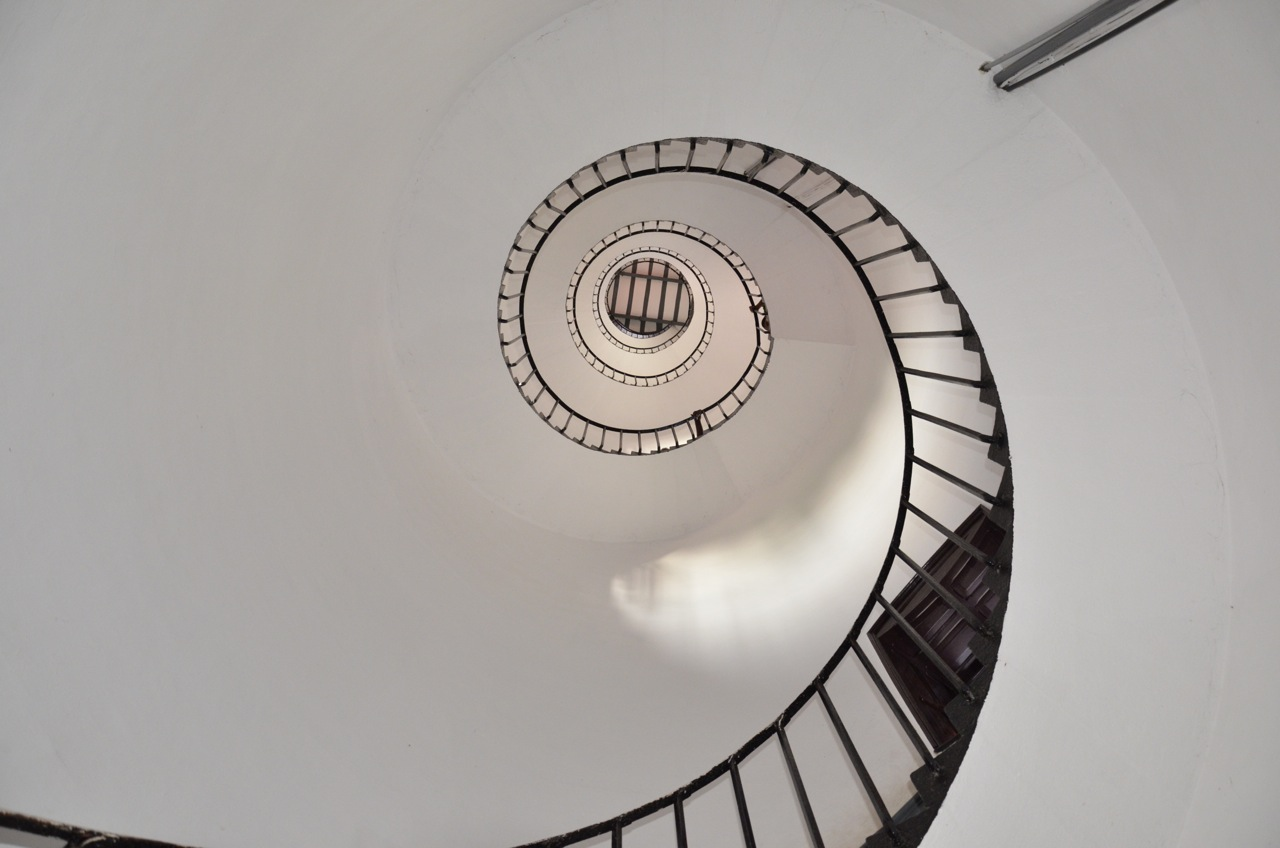
Upstairs in Tangasseri Lighthouse

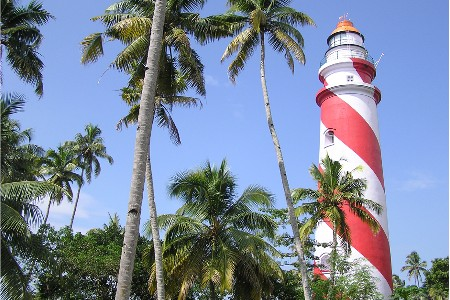
Tangasseri Lighthouse

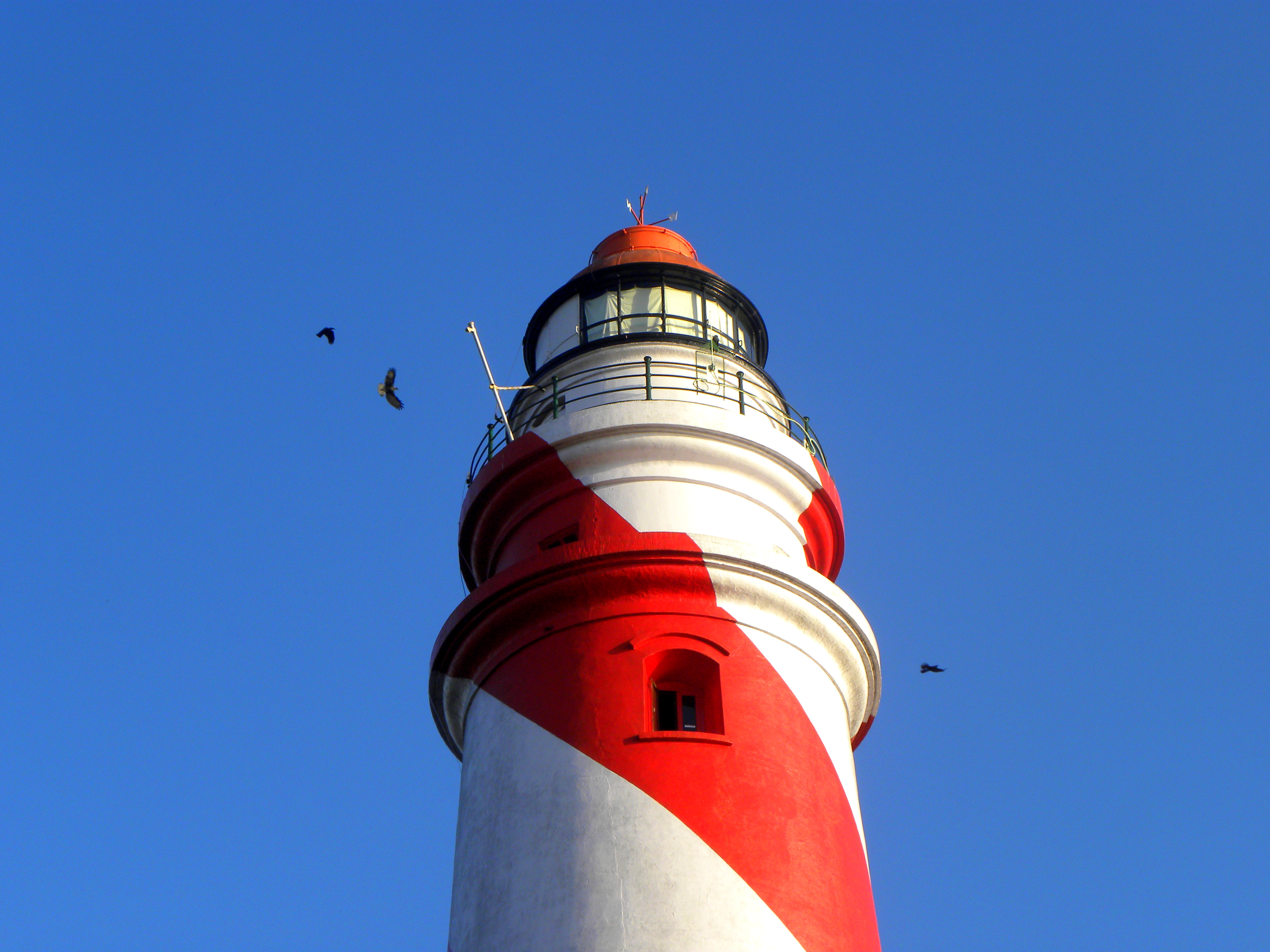
Close view of Tangasseri Lighthouse

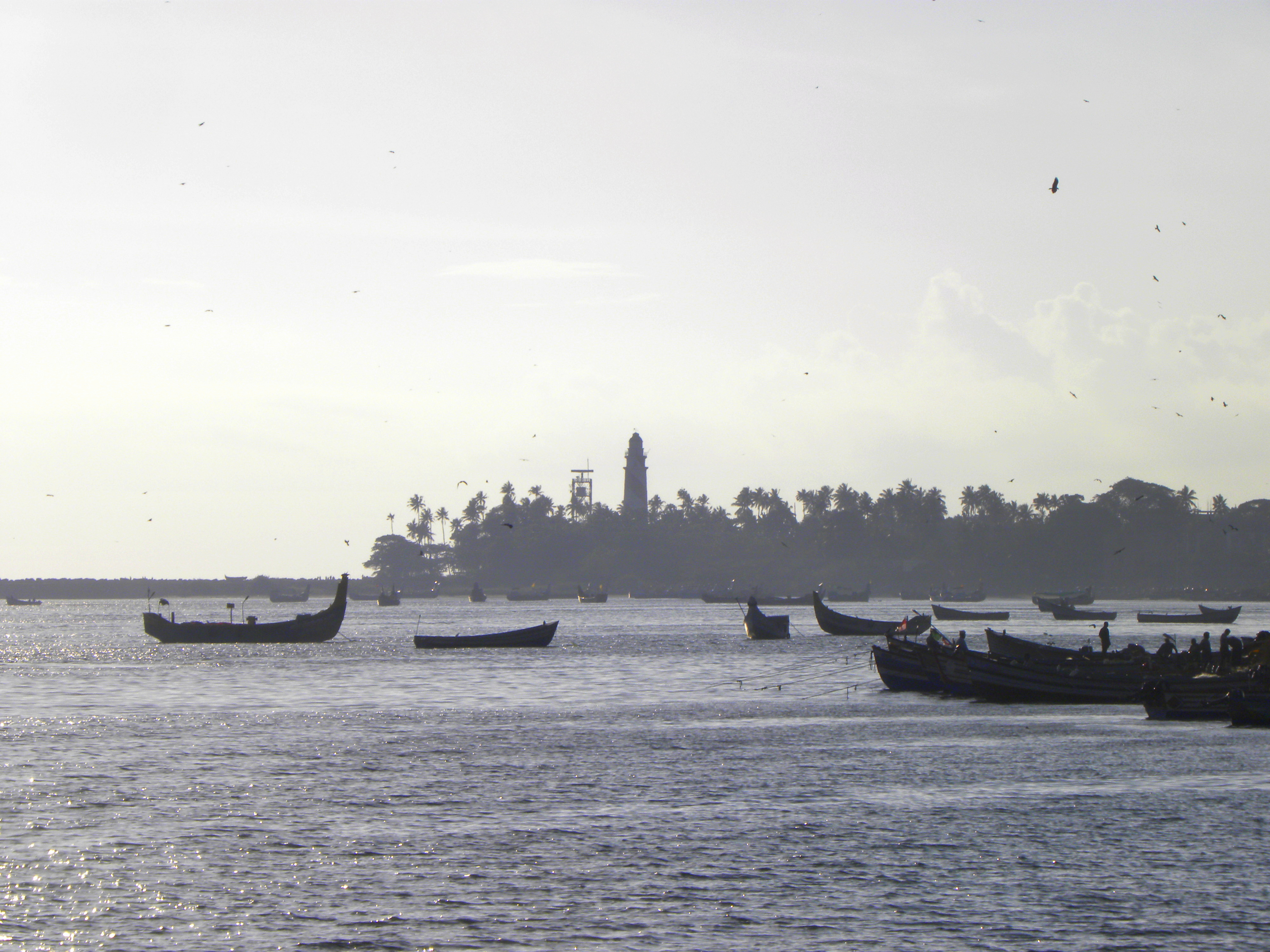
A distant view of Tangasseri Lighthouse from Kollam Port Road

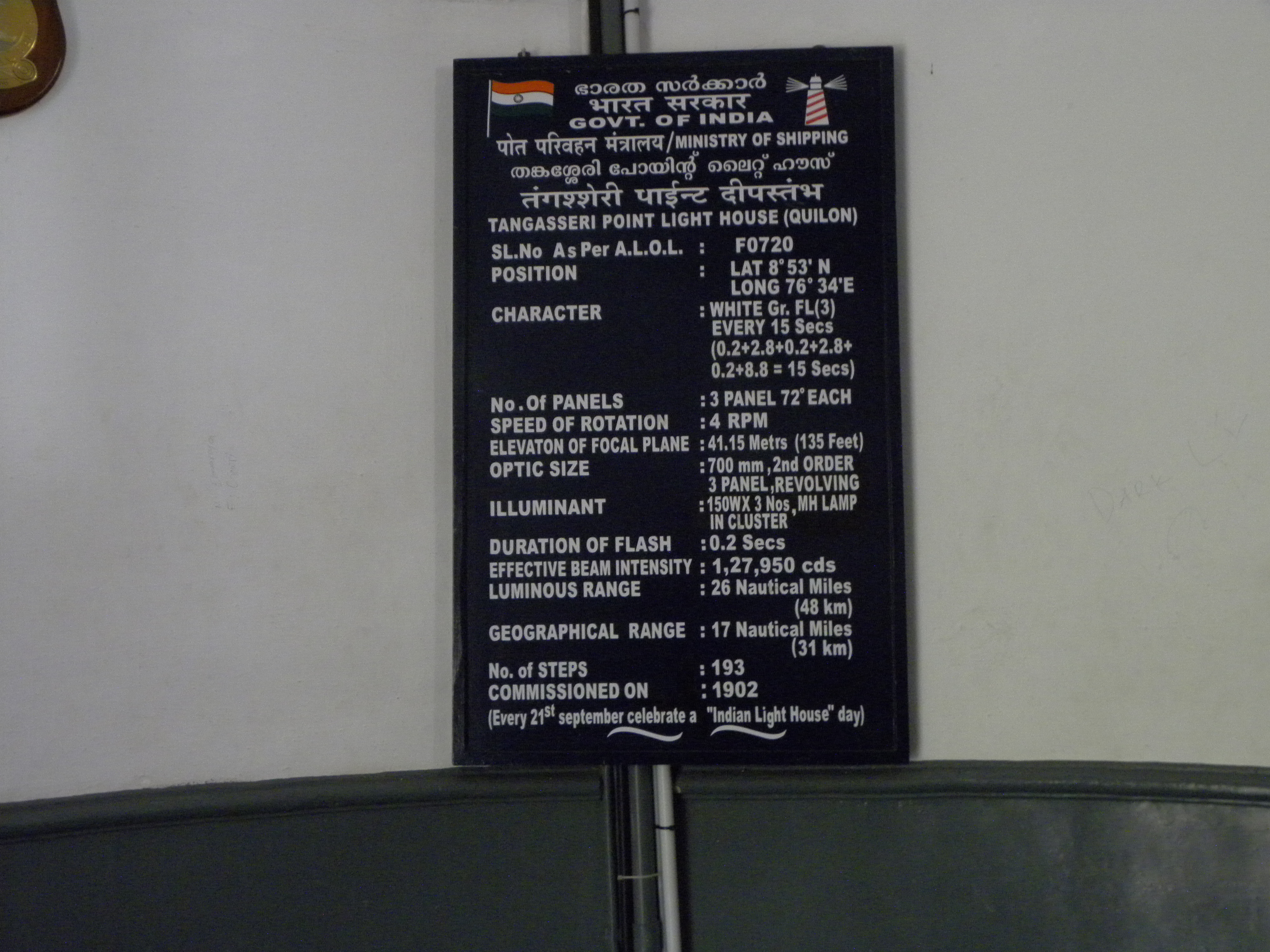
Information board in Thangassery Lighthouse

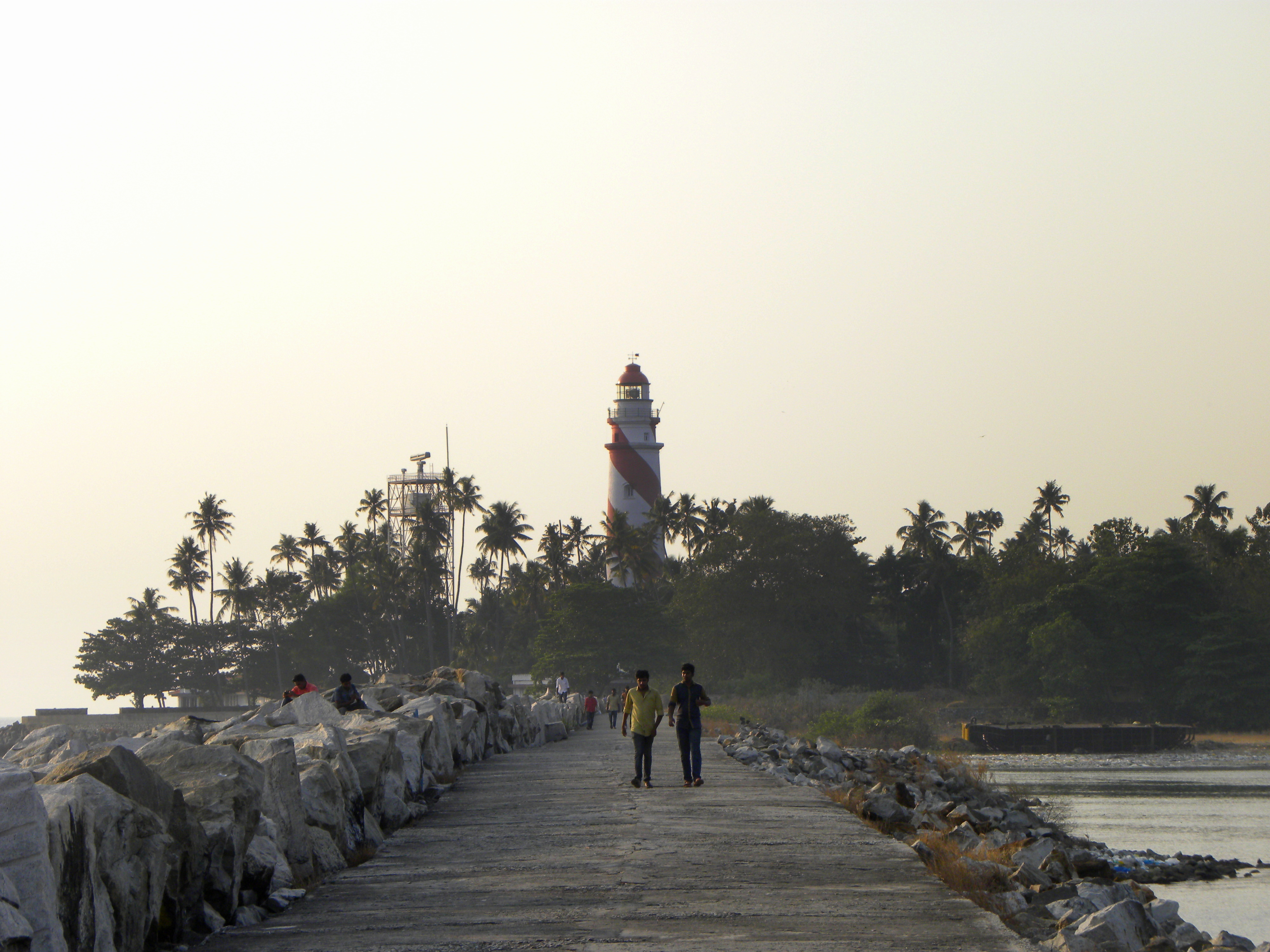
Tangasseri Lighthouse as seen from Tangasseri breakwater

== See also ==
- List of lighthouses in India
