= Tangasseri Bus Terminal =

Bus station in Kollam, India

Tangasseri Bus Bay തങ്കശ്ശേരി ബസ്സ്‌ ടെര്‍മിനല്‍
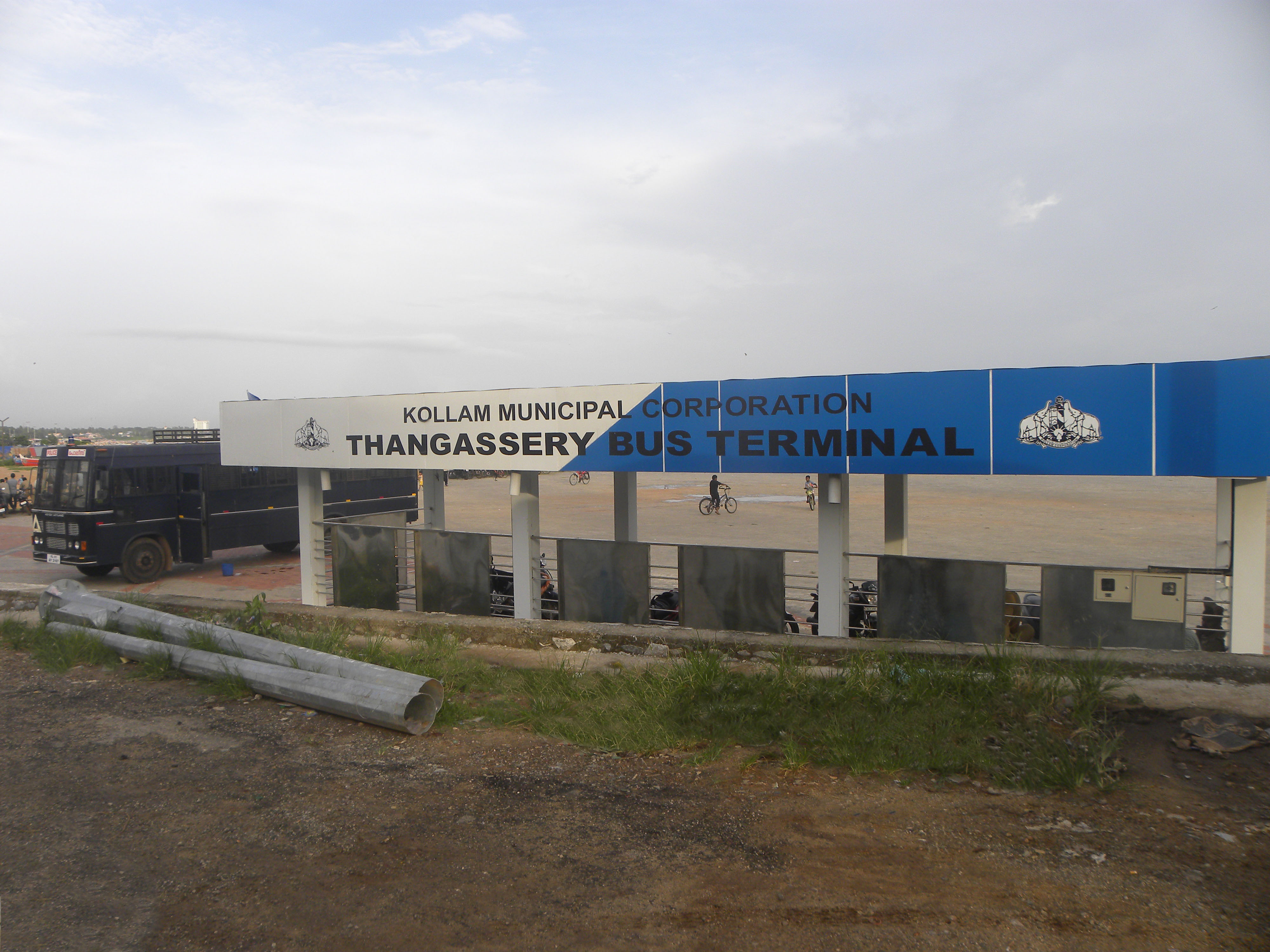
- Tangasseri Bus Terminal

General information
- Location: Tangasseri, Kollam; India
- Coordinates: 8.882547°N 76.569301°E
- Owner: City corporation of Kollam
- Operator: Kollam Municipal Corporation(KMC)

Construction
- Structure type: At Grade
- Parking: No

History
- Opened: 6 September 2014
Location

Tangasseri Bus Terminal or Tangasseri Bus Bay is a bus station in the city of Kollam, India. The bus terminal is opened on 6 September 2014 by Prasanna Earnest, the then Mayor of Kollam city.

== History ==
The intention behind the bus terminal project was to cater the seaside enclave, Tangasseri, with a safe and comfortable way of transportation. Tangasseri witnesses heavy traffic congestion during the morning and evening peak hours because of the hundreds of vehicles reaching there to drop students to the two leading schools in the city, Infant Jesus School and Mount Carmel School. The narrow city road to these schools is also the terminal point for various city service private bus route and this worsens the traffic congestion. This had raised the demand for a separate terminal for city services arriving Tangasseri.

The bus terminal project was actually planned in 2008 by N. Padmalochanan, the second mayor of Kollam City Corporation. But due to environmental clearance issues and geographical and archaeological importance of the site, the district collector of Kollam directed the authorities to stop all the construction activities for bus terminal. Later on 2014, the works resumed after getting the clearance.

== See also ==
- Kollam
- Tangasseri
- Tangasseri Lighthouse
- Portuguese Cemetery, Kollam
- Buckingham Canal, Kollam
