= Portuguese Cemetery, Kollam =

Cemetery in Tangasseri, Kollam, India

Portuguese Cemetery Dutch Cemetery
- Interactive map of Portuguese Cemetery; Dutch Cemetery

Details
- Established: 1519; 507 years ago
- Location: Tangasseri, Kollam city
- Country: India
- Coordinates: 8.881937°N 76.567309°E
- Type: Portuguese
- Style: Portuguese colonial architecture
- No. of graves: Unknown

The Portuguese Cemetery (after the invasion of Dutch, it became Dutch Cemetery) of Tangasseri in Kollam city, India, was constructed around 1519 as part of the Portuguese invasion of the city. Buckingham Canal, a small canal between Tangasseri Lighthouse and the cemetery, is situated very close to the Portuguese Cemetery. A group of pirates known as the Pirates of Tangasseri formerly lived at the Cemetery. The remnants of St. Thomas Fort and Portuguese Cemetery still exist at Tangasseri.

== Overview ==
The City of Kollam is one of the oldest Portuguese–Dutch–English settlements in India. Tangasseri was their centre of activity. Popularly known as Tangy, Tanganeri was an erstwhile trading outpost of the Portuguese, other Europeans, Arabs, Chinese and Jews.

The site is a centrally protected monument under the control of Archaeological Survey of India since 1920. There is some unconfirmed news that the authorities are not protecting these remnants well and some apartment constructions have already started there at this heritage site.

== Location ==
The cemetery is very close to the ancient settlement at Tangasseri and the lighthouse. Kollam Port is very close to this heritage site. The city center is about 3 km away.
