= Tarisappalli =

Historical Saint Thomas Christian church in Kollam

Church of the Tarisa People
- Kollam Tarisappalli
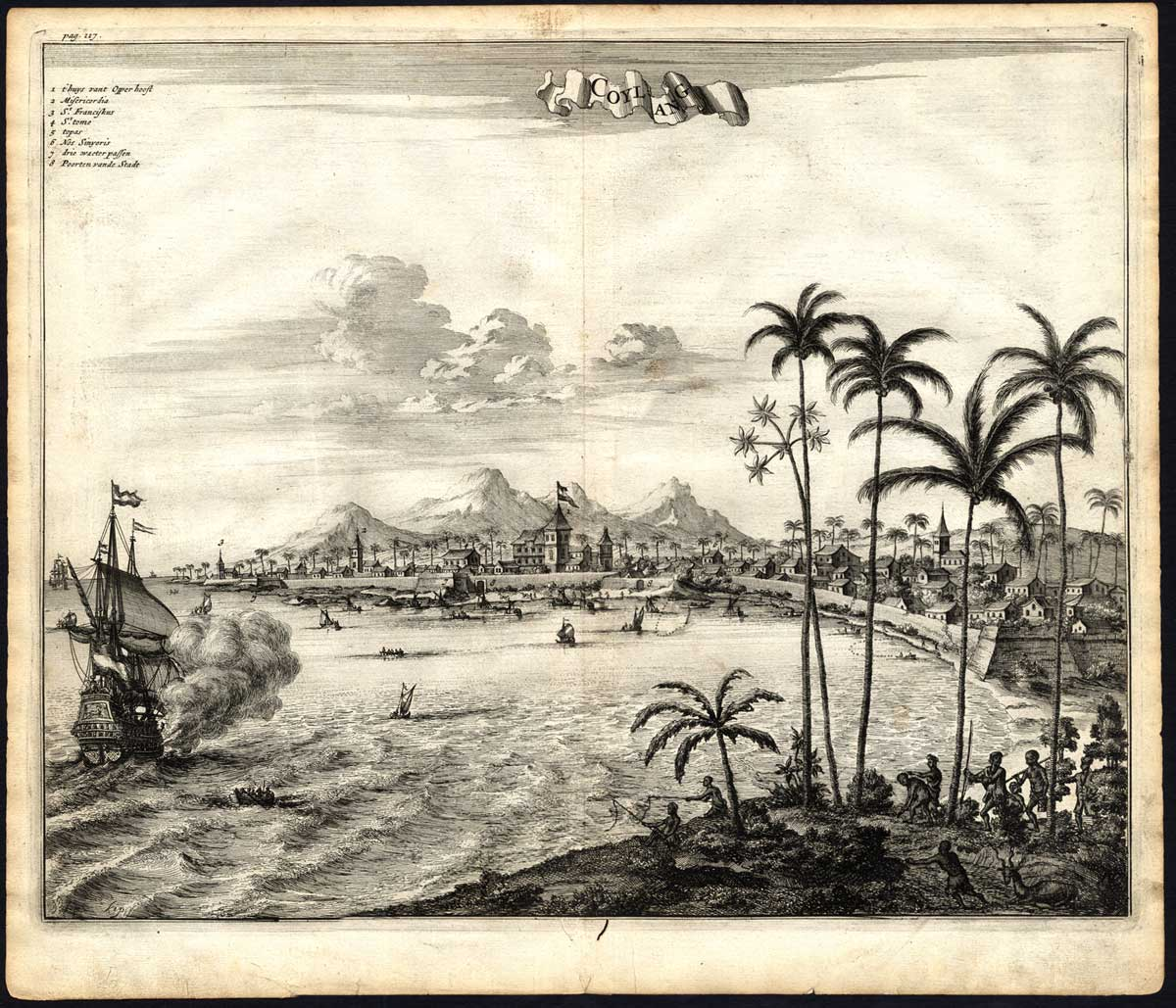
- A Dutch (Nieuhof) depiction of the port of Kollam in 1682, with the Tarisappalli Church (4) also visible.

Religion
- Affiliation: Christianity (Persian Church)
- Sect: Saint Thomas Christians
- Rite: East Syriac
- Year consecrated: 1st century AD (per tradition); Early 9th century AD
- Status: Defunct

Location
- Location: Kollam (Quilon)
- Country: Venadu, Medieval Chera Kingdom

Architecture
- Founder: Saint Thomas (per tradition); Iso da Tapir (according to the Quilon Syian Copper Plates)
- Direction of façade: West

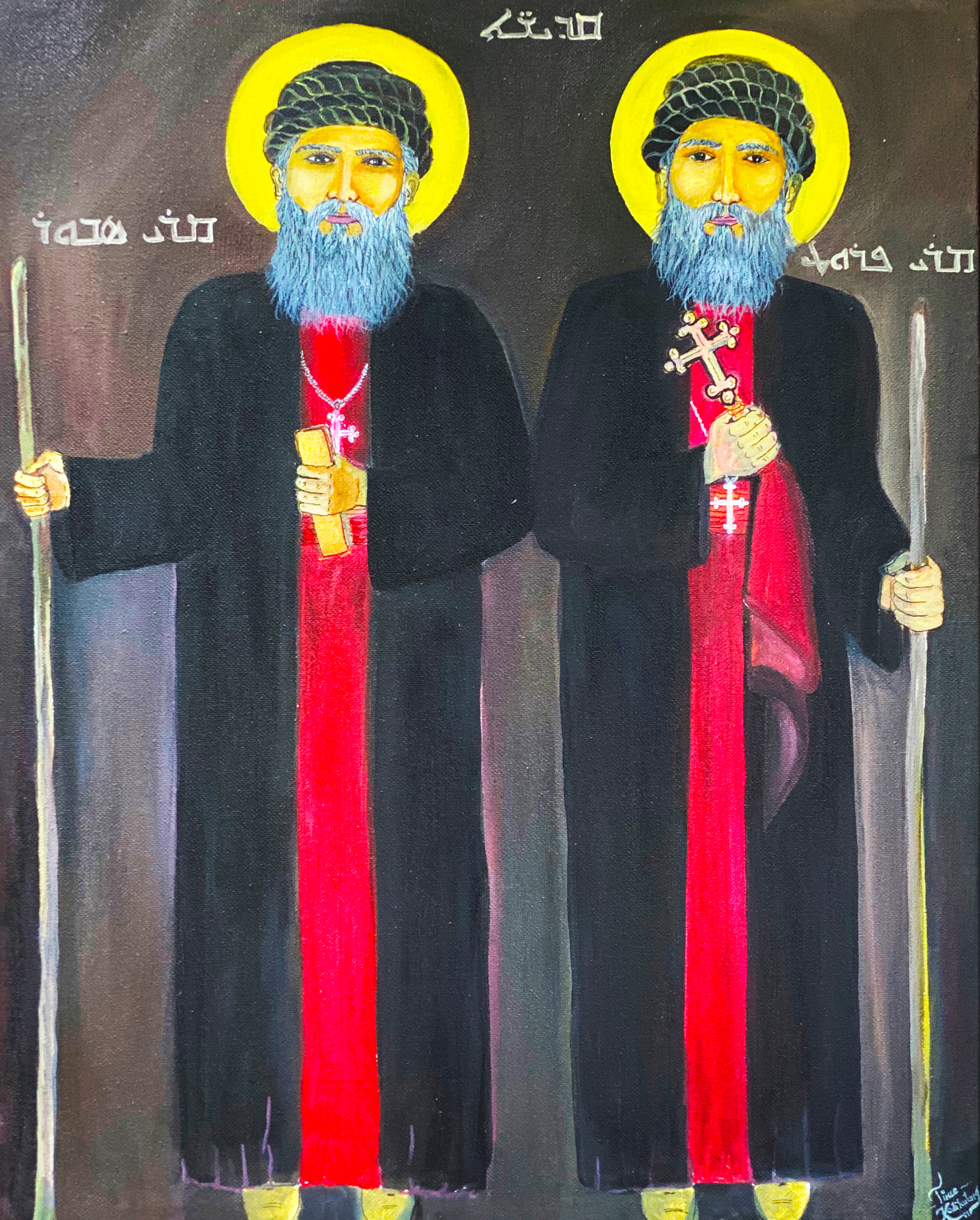
Mar Sapor (or Sabor) and his colleague Mar Proth, the Persian Syrian bishops, are believed to have arrived in Kerala in the early 9th century (modern depiction).

Tarisāppaḷḷi (Malayalam: തരിസാപ്പള്ളി) or Kollam Tarisāppaḷḷi (കൊല്ലം തരിസാപ്പള്ളി) was a Persian–Syrian Christian church in Kollam (also called Kurakkeni Kollam or Quilon) on the Malabar Coast, southern India. The earliest known epigraphical reference to this church appears in the medieval Tarisappalli Copper Plates. The original site of the church is identified with the present-day Tangasseri Fort area in Kollam. Local tradition holds that this ancient church was among the Seven Churches founded by St. Thomas, one of the Twelve Apostles, on the Malabar Coast.

The church in Kollam is regarded as one of the most prominent among the Ēḻarappaḷḷikaḷ (the Seven and a Half Churches), which are traditionally believed to have been established by the Apostle Thomas in the 1st century AD on the Malabar Coast. The Ramban Pattu, the traditional Malayalam ballad that narrates the missionary journey of Apostle Thomas in India, notably identifies it as the second in the list of seven churches after Kodungallur. However, as with most ancient churches on the Malabar Coast, its subsequent history remains unclear.

The medieval history of the church begins with the Tarisappalli or Quilon Syian Copper Plates, issued by the ruler of Venadu (Kollam; formerly Quilon) to the Church of the Tarisais in Kurakkeni Kollam around 849 AD. According to long-standing tradition among the Saint Thomas Christians, the Persian saints Sabor and Aproth, who arrived in Malabar at that time, rebuilt the then-ruined church. The church is also referenced in the accounts of Western missionaries and travelers who visited Kerala in later centuries.

== Etymology ==
The hybrid term "Tarisappalli" literally means "the building or place of worship of the Tarisa people". The word "Tarisa" is perhaps derived from the Pahlavi or Middle Persian term "Tarsa", one of the names used for Christians in the Sassanian Persian Empire.

== Early medieval history ==
=== Tarisappalli Copper Plates ===
The Tarisappalli or Quilon Syrian Copper Plates (c. 849 AD) were issued by Ayyan Adikal Tiruvadikal, the ruler of Venad or Kollam and a subordinate of the medieval Chera king Sthanu Ravi Kulasekhara, who governed the Malabar Coast from Kodungallur-Mahodayapuram. The grant was made to a Persian merchant-magnate named Maruwān Sāpir Īśo. It was issued in the name of the church of the Tarsa community in Kollam—a church that had been "built and administered" by Īśo da Tāpir, who is also credited with "founding the trading city (nagara) of Kollam". The grant conferred land, property, servants or slaves, the authority to collect taxes, and the right to self-government upon the Tarisappalli and its community in Kollam.

The record is regarded as one of the most important historical documents discovered in Kerala and is also among the earliest indigenous records to provide information about the Christian community in the Indian subcontinent.

Local tradition, supported by modern scholars, generally identifies "Īśo da Tāpir" in the record with "Maruwān Sāpir Īśo". There is, however, some debate regarding the origin of the term "Maruwān". One prominent view holds that it is derived from the Syriac honorific "Mar", a title used for bishops and saints in the Syriac Christian tradition. Another interpretation suggests that the name reflects his association with a Christian trading community known as the "Marwanaye" in the Persian Gulf. This community is mentioned by the East Syriac Catholicos-Patriarch Ishoyahb III in his letter to Simeon of Rev Ardashir, the Metropolitan of Pars. It is further speculated that the Kollam Era—the traditional Kerala calendar—commemorates the founding of the port city (the nagara) of Kollam in 825 AD.

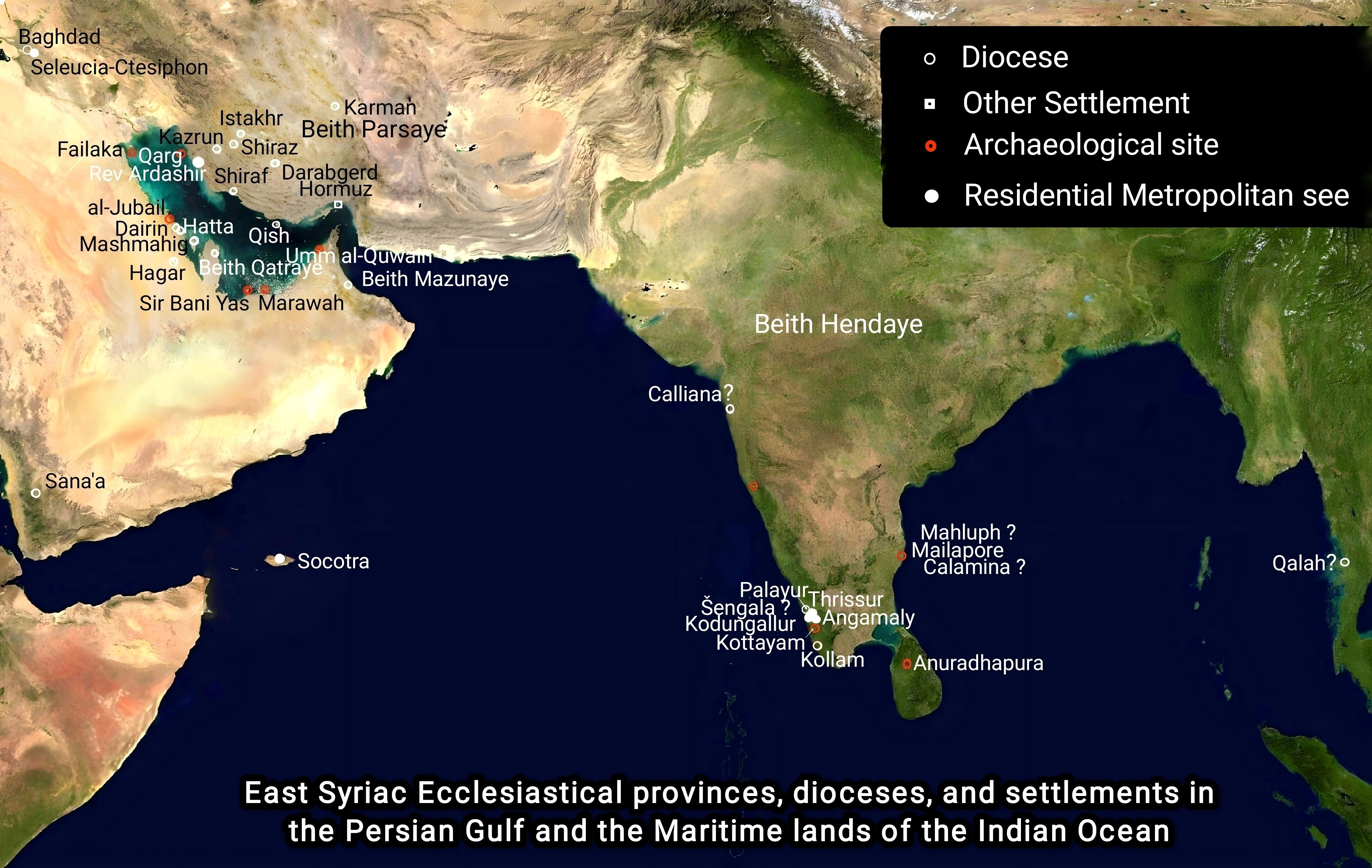
The East Syriac metropolitan provinces, dioceses, and other centers on the maritime routes in the Indian Ocean

== Early European accounts ==
=== Descriptions from the 13th and 14th Centuries ===
The earliest extant historical records concerning the Christian presence in Kollam and their church, following the Tarisappalli grant, date back to the 13th and 14th centuries AD. The first such account comes from the Venetian merchant and adventurer Marco Polo. Marco Polo arrived in Kollam in the latter half of the 13th century. In his observations, he noted the presence of significant Christian and Jewish communities in Kollam. Subsequent references are found in the writings of Jordanus Catalani and Giovanni de Marignoli, both of whom recorded their encounters with the Nasrani, or Syriac Christians, during their visits to the port of Kollam.

Jordanus Catalani, a French Dominican missionary sent to the Middle East and Persia, was appointed Roman Catholic Bishop of Kollam in 1329 by Pope John XXII. His writings also document the existence of Syrian Christians in Kollam, with particular emphasis on their veneration of the Apostle Thomas. In addition, Pope John XXII sent a letter to the leader of the Nasrani Christian community in Kollam on April 5, 1330, urging cooperation with the newly appointed bishop. These letters are preserved in Catalani's book Mirabilia Descripta.

Giovanni de Marignolli, a Franciscan friar, passed through Kollam in 1347 while returning to Europe after his mission in China. He recorded a detailed description of the Nasrani Christians of Kollam, noting their significant influence in Kollam. According to Marignolli, the Nasrani were primarily engaged in the cultivation and trade of pepper, and those of higher social status were referred to as Mothaliyal. He also recounts his personal experience living among them, describing how the Nasrani provided him with financial assistance and even transported him in a royal palanquin, reminiscent of the luxury associated with King Solomon.

== Sixteenth Century ==
The detailed recorded history of the Kollam Church is available from the 16th century.

=== Early Sixteenth Century ===
The next mention of the Syrian Christians in Kollam is found in the early 16th century, in a letter sent by Mar Yahbalaha, Mar Thomas, Mar Jacob, Mar Denha to the East Syriac Catholicos Eliyah V. Along with Koṭungallur and Pālayūr, Kollam is recorded in it as one of three main centers of the Syrian Christians in Malabar. During the tenure of Mar Yahbalaha, who held the position of Metropolitan of India, Mar Jacob and Mar Denaha worked based in Koṭungallur and Kollam, respectively.

The Nasranis of Kollam, who had mainly made a living from trade, were going through various crises. Since the traders from Arabia, Persia and China were mainly Muslims, they had stronger trade relations with the Muslim traders of Malabar and with the Zamorin of Kozhikode, who sympathized with them. This hampered Kollam and its Jewish and Christian merchants in commercial and trade endeavours.

=== Portuguese Interactions ===
==== Arrival of the Portuguese ====
The Portuguese sailor Afonso de Albuquerque, who arrived in Malabar in 1503, described the Kollam church and the Christians in detail in his writings. In the same year, he also obtained permission to establish a factory (warehouse) in Kollam to facilitate trade for the Portuguese. He describes the Kollam church as one that is dedicated to 'Our Lady of Mercy' and has three altars and each one has a cross, one in the middle is made of Gold and there are one on each side, made of silver. He recorded the Christians told him that their church was built by two saints who had previously arrived in Malabar, and that they were buried in two chapels in the church. These saints are Sapor and Proth, unique saints of the Syrian Christians of Malabar. Albuquerque explains that the Christians of Kollam have a number of special powers granted to them, and that they have their own autonomous legal system based on this. Along with this, the Christians who controlled the church also had the right to possess the town's seal and official weights and measures. However, Albuquerque adds that due to the displeasure of the local king, those rights were taken away at that time and they sought his help to have them restored.

Relations between the Portuguese and the Syrian Christians were initially very cordial. The Syrian Christians asked Albuquerque for help in regaining their lost rights and wished to present the Portuguese King with the golden cross from their church. However, Albuquerque refused this and instead, upon returning home, took one of their silver crosses with him and presented it to the Portuguese king. Pleased with this, the king sent some chandeliers and decorations for the Kollam church to Albuquerque in return for the Christians. Albuquerque gave the Christians a gift of a picture and a bell of Saint James the Apostle, known as the Apostle of the Iberian Peninsula. He assigned Rodrigo, a Dominican friar, to assist the religious needs of the Christians in Kollam. Rodrigo administered baptism and other sacraments to the Syrian Christians in Kollam, and also spread the religion among the non-Christians of the area, converting many of them. It is also believed that he renovated and rebuilt the oldest church in Kollam. Giovanni da Empoli, an Italian sailor and Albuquerque's companion, says that there are about 3,000 Christians in Kollam and they told him that their church dates back to the time of Thomas the Apostle.

==== Syrians losing control of the church ====
The initial cooperation between the Portuguese and the indigenous Christians did not last long. The indigenous Christians, who had become alienated from the Portuguese for various reasons, gradually withdrew from the region and began to settle in more remote areas. Following this, the Portuguese took complete control of the old Syrian church in Kollam. There were several reasons for this. Francisco Roz, the first Latin Metropolitan of the Syrian Christians after the Synod of Diamper in 1599, gives a description in this regard. The Portuguese often engaged in conflicts with the local people. A dispute between some Portuguese and Muslim traders in the area became a major problem, after they killed a Muslim man. Following this, a number of Nairs and Muslims, led by local authorities, attacked and destroyed the Portuguese trading post in order to take revenge on them, and looted the market there. Following this, six or seven Portuguese sought refuge in a Syrian Christian church. The attackers demanded the Syrian Christians to get them out of the church and allow the punitive measures against the Portuguese to be carried out. But not only did the Portuguese not flee the church, but the parishioners were not ready to expel them as they had sought refuge in the church. Unable to trespass into the church and capture them, the opponents arsoned the church from outside. Everyone in the church, including a deacon and some Syrian Christians along with the Portuguese, died in the fire. This incident probably happened sometime after 1505. After this, the Portuguese rebuilt the burnt-down church and it gradually came under the complete control of their Bishop of Cochin. After 1519, they built a a fort, engulfing the area where the church was located. They had already renamed the church after the Apostle Thomas. Hence, the fort also came to be known by the name of Thomas the Apostle. After this, the Syrian Christians left the church and the place and moved to the interior of Kollam and established a new church there. But there was other reasons that forced the Syrian Christians to abandon their old church. By this time, the Portuguese had begun to assert that the Syrian Christians were followers of the Nestorian heresy and false customs and that they needed to be Latinized, and had already initiated a wave of latinization campaign against the local christians and their traditions.

Following these events, the Latin faithful in the area under the control of the Cochin Bishop attempted to seize the rights granted in the Tarsappalli plates. However, the local ruler, who ruled that the rights in that edict belonged not to the church building but to the community represented by the church at the time of its granting, declared that those rights are to be enjoyed only by the Syrians in Kollam. Alexis de Menezes, the Portuguese Archbishop of Goa, visited in Kollam both the original Tarsappalli that was then occupied by the Portuguese and the new church in the interior that the Syrians had established, as part of his travels throughout Malabar following the Synod of Diamper. Gouvea, in his monumental work called the 'Jornada', also records that he visited the church in Thevalakkara, which was also under the rule of the Kollam (Chenganate) ruler.

== Later history of Tarisappalli ==
In the 17th century, the Dutch gradually supplanted the Portuguese as the dominant power in the spice trade along the Malabar Coast. They seized control of Tangasseri Fort and its associated structures, including the church. The church is prominently depicted on a Dutch map of the fort and in their illustration of the port of Kollam, both dating from this period.

In the final decade of the 18th century, the English Company took possession of the fort and its surrounding territory from the Dutch, and the fort was largely demolished. When British missionary Thomas Whitehouse visited Kollam in 1863, he became aware of the historical significance of the Tarisappalli Church. Upon visiting the location of the fort, however, he found no remnants of the church. Whitehouse hypothesized that the church had likely been "swept away by the encroaching sea".
