= Fort Thomas =

Fort Thomas may refer to a place in the United States:

- Fort Thomas, Arizona, an unincorporated community
- Fort Thomas, Kentucky, a city and former army post

== See also ==
- Fort Thomas, Tangasseri, a ruined fortification in Kerala, India
