= Port Road, Kollam =

Road in Kollam, India

Kollam Port Road
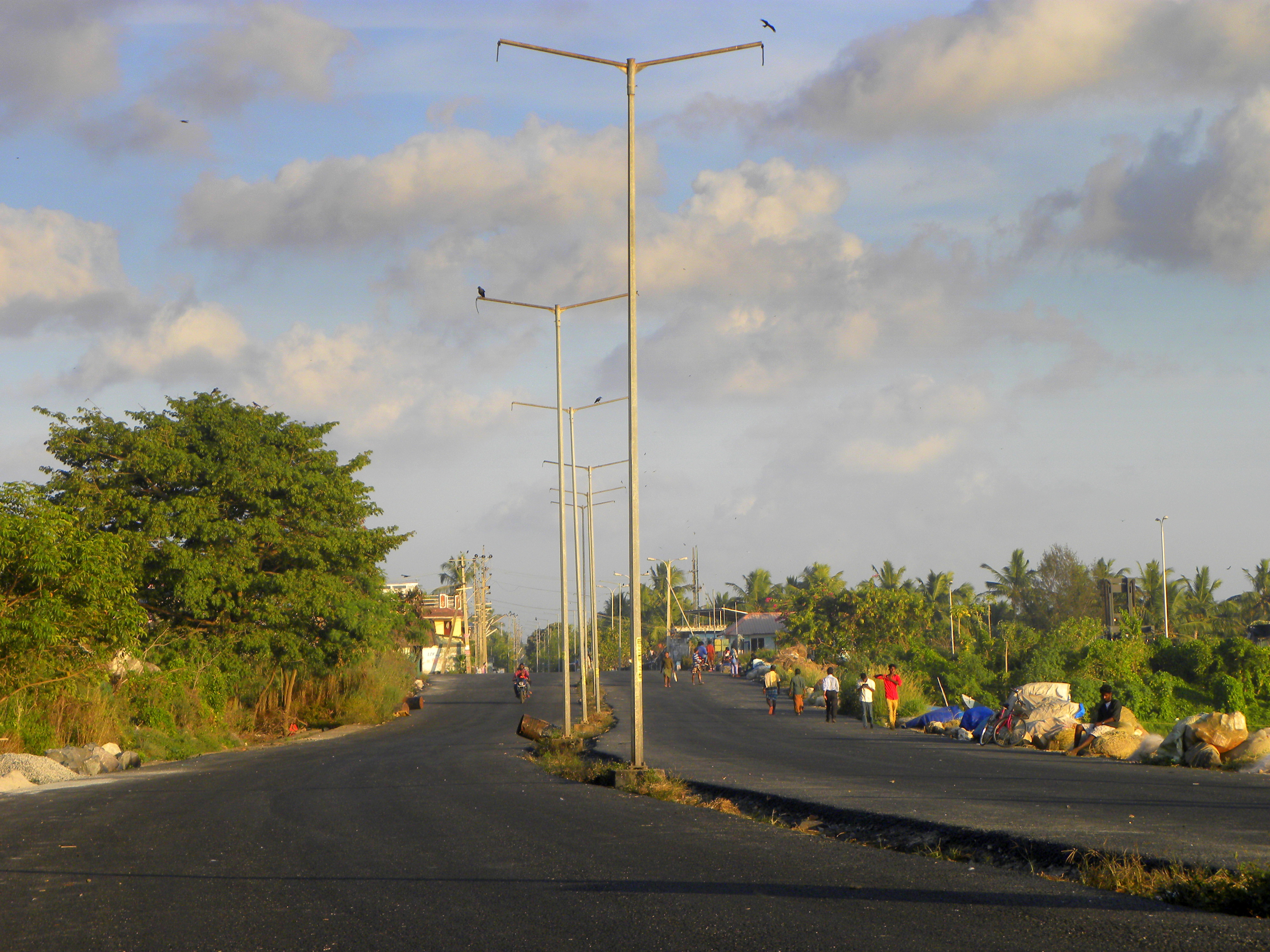
- Port Road

Route information
- Maintained by Kerala Ports & Harbours Department
- Length: 2.863 km (1.779 mi)
- Existed: 31 December 2016–present
- History: Planned in 2009

Major junctions
- South-West end: Kochupilamoodu in Kollam
- Kollam Beach; Kodimaram Jn. Kollam Port; Tangasseri Harbour
- North-West end: Vaddy in Kollam

Location
- Country: India
- Major cities: Kollam

Highway system
- Roads in India; Expressways; National; State; Asian

Kollam Port Road or Port Road, Kollam is a four lane road in the city of Kollam, India. The 2.8-kilometre-long (1.7 mi) road connects historic Port of Quilon (Kollam Port) and Vaddy with Kochupilamoodu in the city through Kollam Beach.

== History ==
A detailed plan for constructing a four lane road to connect century-old Port of Quilon with Kollam city was first suggested by P. K. Gurudasan, the then Labour minister of Kerala state, in 2007. V. S. Achuthanandan lead LDF ministry had sanctioned fund in 2009-2010 Kerala budget, to take over 71.5 cents of land from Kochupilammoodu bridge road to the Port road from private parties and also sanctioned Rs.2.43 crore for road construction works. On 16 February 2016, the site was transferred for construction and the works completed on 31 December 2016. The road was inaugurated by Kerala Port Minister Kadannappalli Ramachandran on 19 September 2017.

== The road project ==
The first phase of the road, between Vaddy and Kollam Port had been completed in 2010. The total estimated project cost including phase-II is Rs.13.52 crores.

| No. | Heading | Parameter | Project cost in Rs. crores |
|---|---|---|---|
| 1 | Approach road cost | Indicative project cost for covering 2.5 km from port gate to | 9 |
| 2 | Land acquisition cost | Cost of acquiring the indicative 1 acre at market rate | 3 |
| 3 | Site development cost | Construction of road drain & footpath, Electrification of port road | 1.52 |
| | Total Project Cost in Rs. Crores | | 13.52 |

== Current status ==
The four-laning works have completed in a 1.7 km stretch between Tangasseri Bus Terminal and Kollam Port. From Kollam Port to Vaddy Kadappuram 600 metres of this road is yet to be widened. The four-laning works remaining 500 metre stretch of the road from Vaddy Kadappuram till Kochupilamoodu bridge near Kollam Beach is also completed.

However, in-order to make the freight movement to the port from National Highway 66 (India), National Highway 744 (India), National Waterway 3 easier widening and four laning of

- Tangasseri Bus Terminal - Ammachiveedu - Vellayittambalam - Kavanad road,
- Kochupilamoodu - Kappalandimukku - Mevaram
- Kollam Inland Port Asramam - Kappalandimukku road and

Dredging and improvement on Kollam Canal from Kollam Inland Port Asramam till Kochupilamoodu are necessary.

== Gallery ==
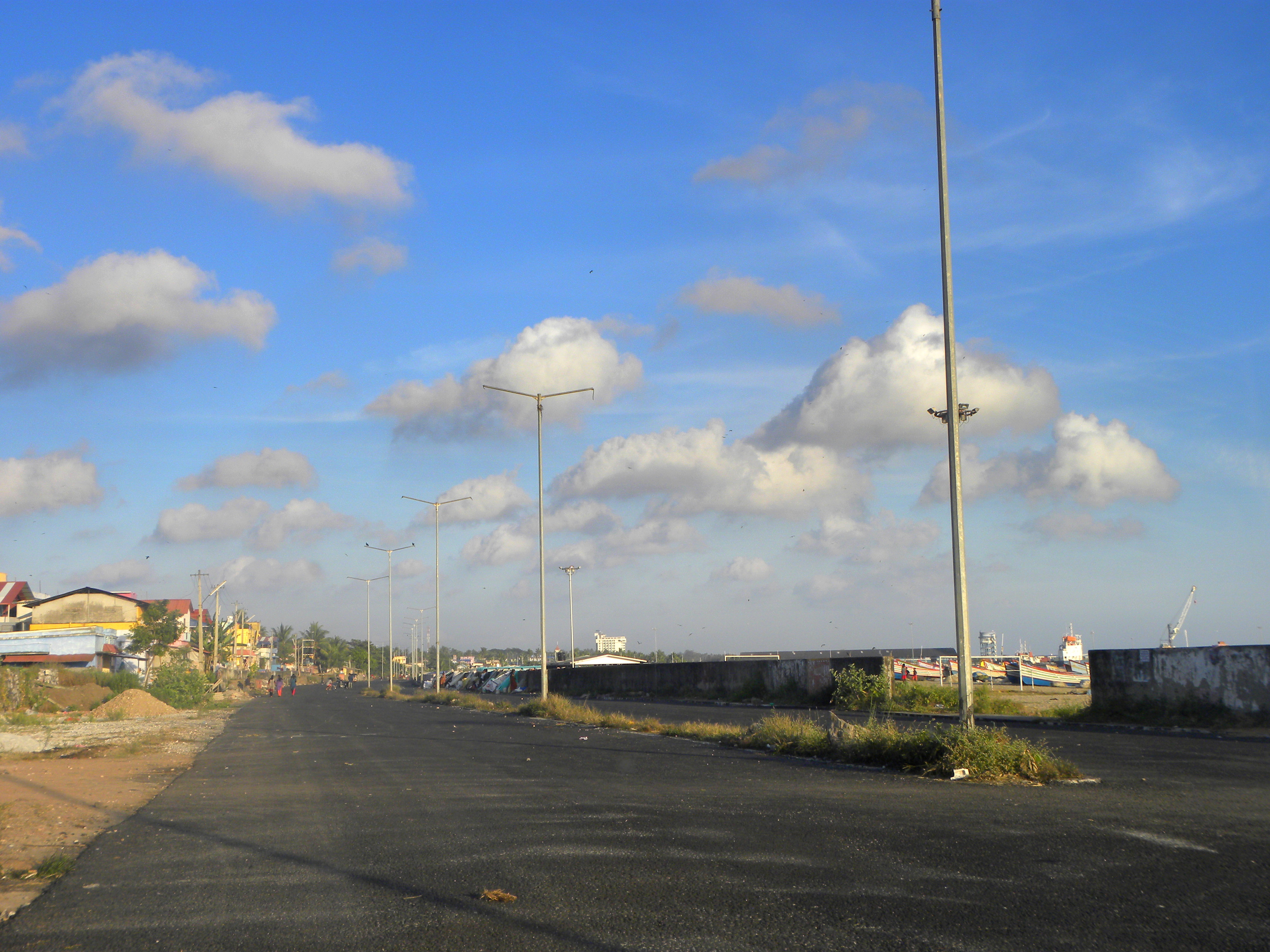
Port Road as seen from Tangasseri Fishing Harbour

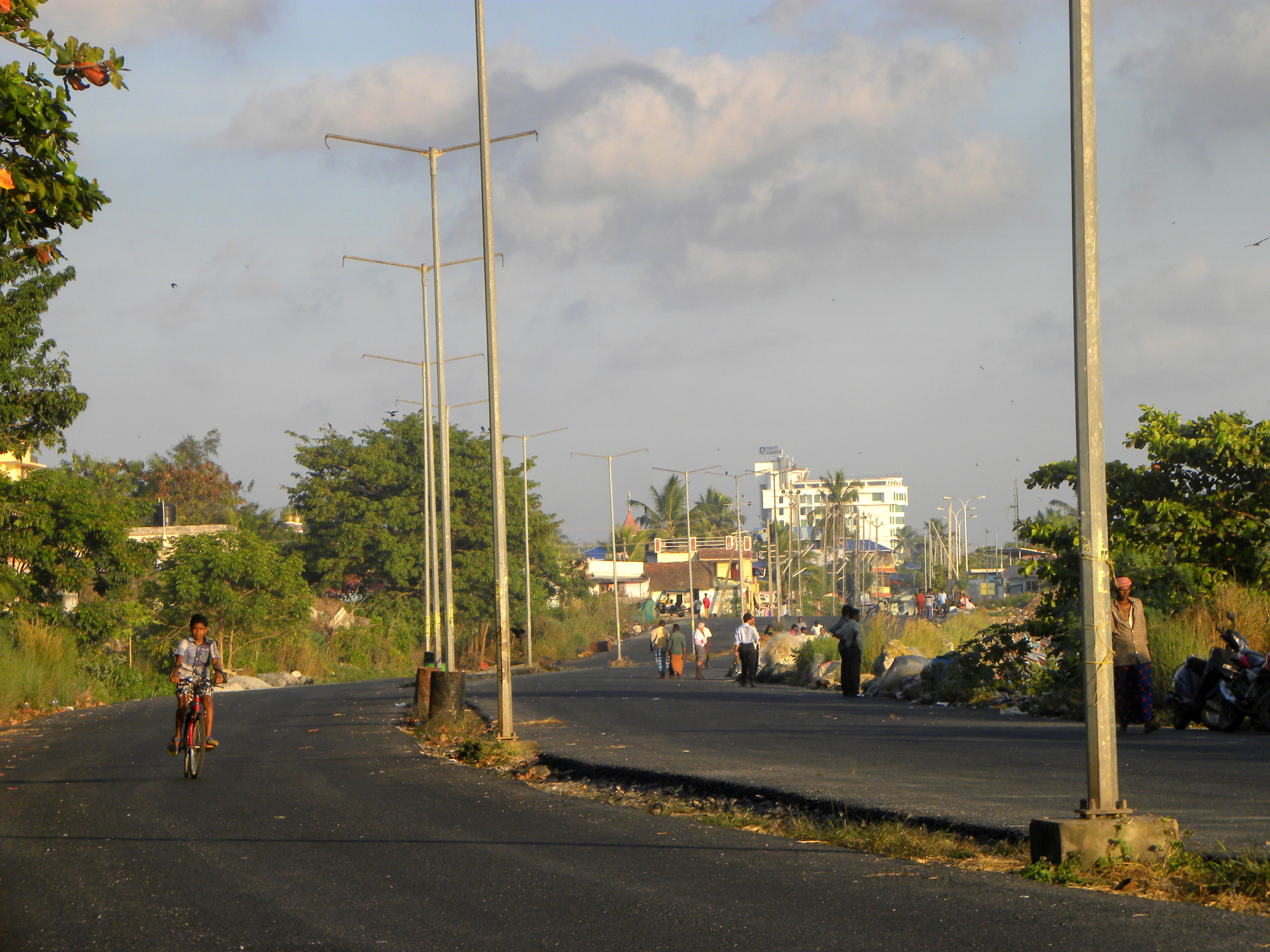
Port Road near Kollam Port

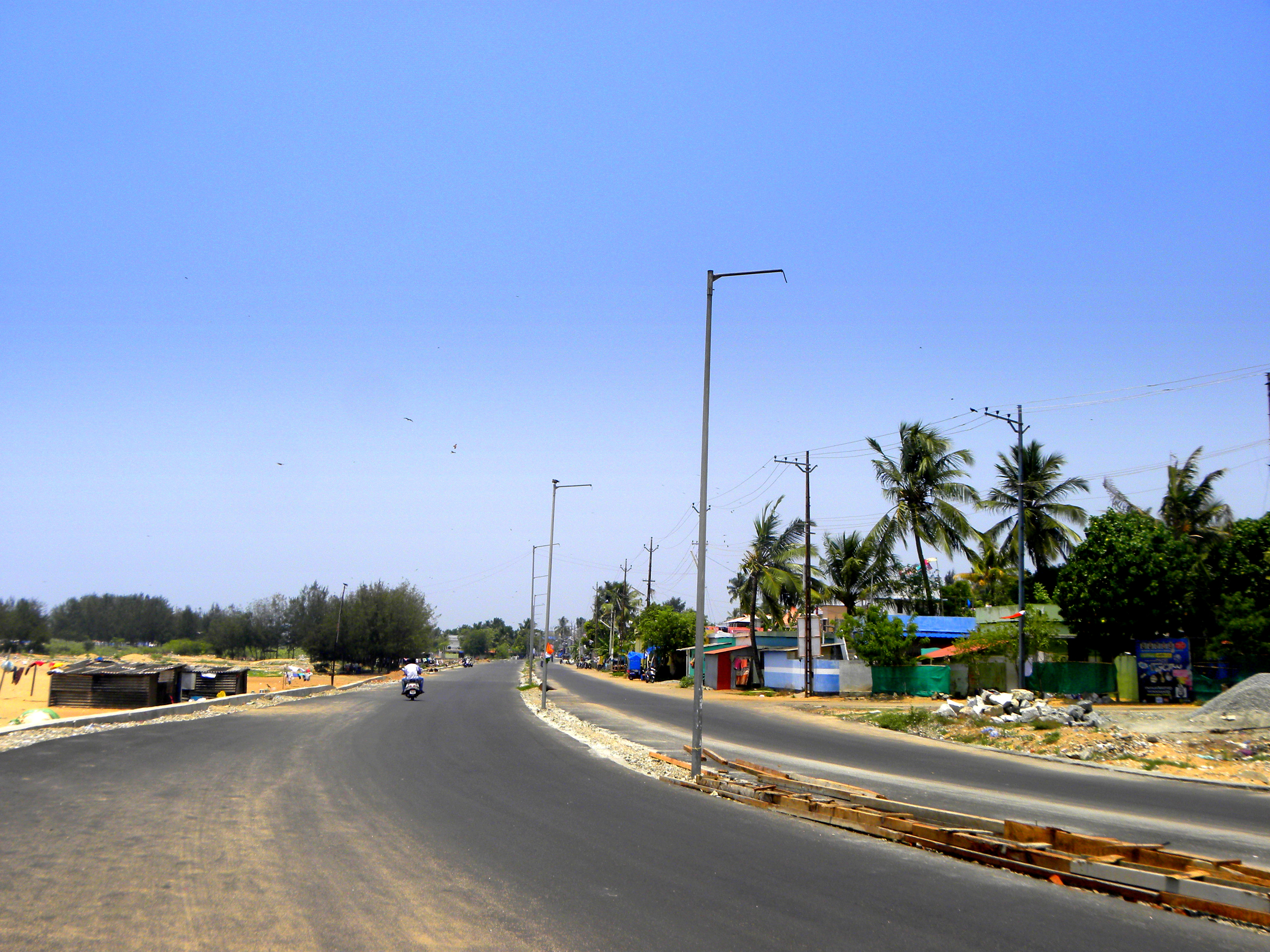
Port Road near Kollam Beach

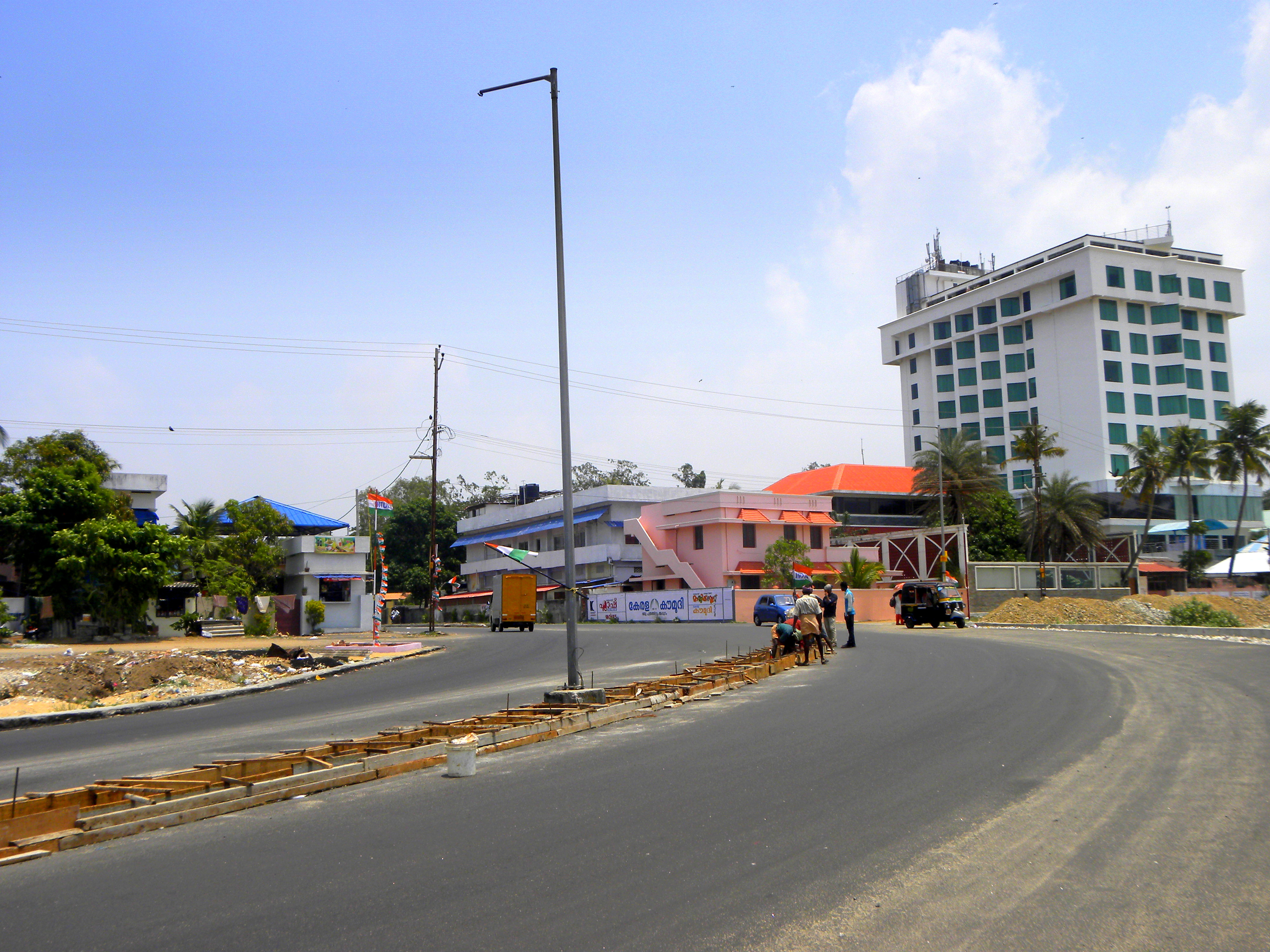
Port Road near The Quilon Beach 5-star Hotel

== See also ==
- Roads in Kerala
- Kollam
- Kollam Port
- Kollam Beach
