= Kurakkeni Kollam =

Medieval port city in India

Kurakkeni Kollam (present day Kollam) was a premier medieval port city, urban center, and the capital of the Venad kingdom along the Malabar Coast of southwestern India. Historians identify Kurakkeni Kollam as an early trading centre that existed before the establishment of the medieval port city of Kollam (Quilon) in the 9th century CE.

During the early medieval period (c. 800–1400 CE), the city operated as one of the most vital nodes of the Indian Ocean maritime trade network, connecting the Abbasid Caliphate, the Tang and Song dynasties of China, and the empires of Southeast Asia. It is historically celebrated as the birthplace of the Kollam Era (825 CE).

== Etymology ==
The term "Kore-ke-ni" is believed to refer to an earlier harbour settlement that existed in the Kollam region before the development of the medieval port city. "Kuraku" refers to a curve and "keni" to a reservoir, alluding to Ashtamudi Lake, which had an arch-shaped shore.

Kurakkeni Kollam serves as a foundational geographical and legal anchor in the two most important epigraphical charters of early medieval Kerala: the Quilon (Tharisapalli) Syrian Copper Plates (849 CE) and the Mampalli Plates (973 CE) (Narayanan, 2013).
