= Tangasseri =

Tangasseri Thangassery, Tangy
- Neighbourhood
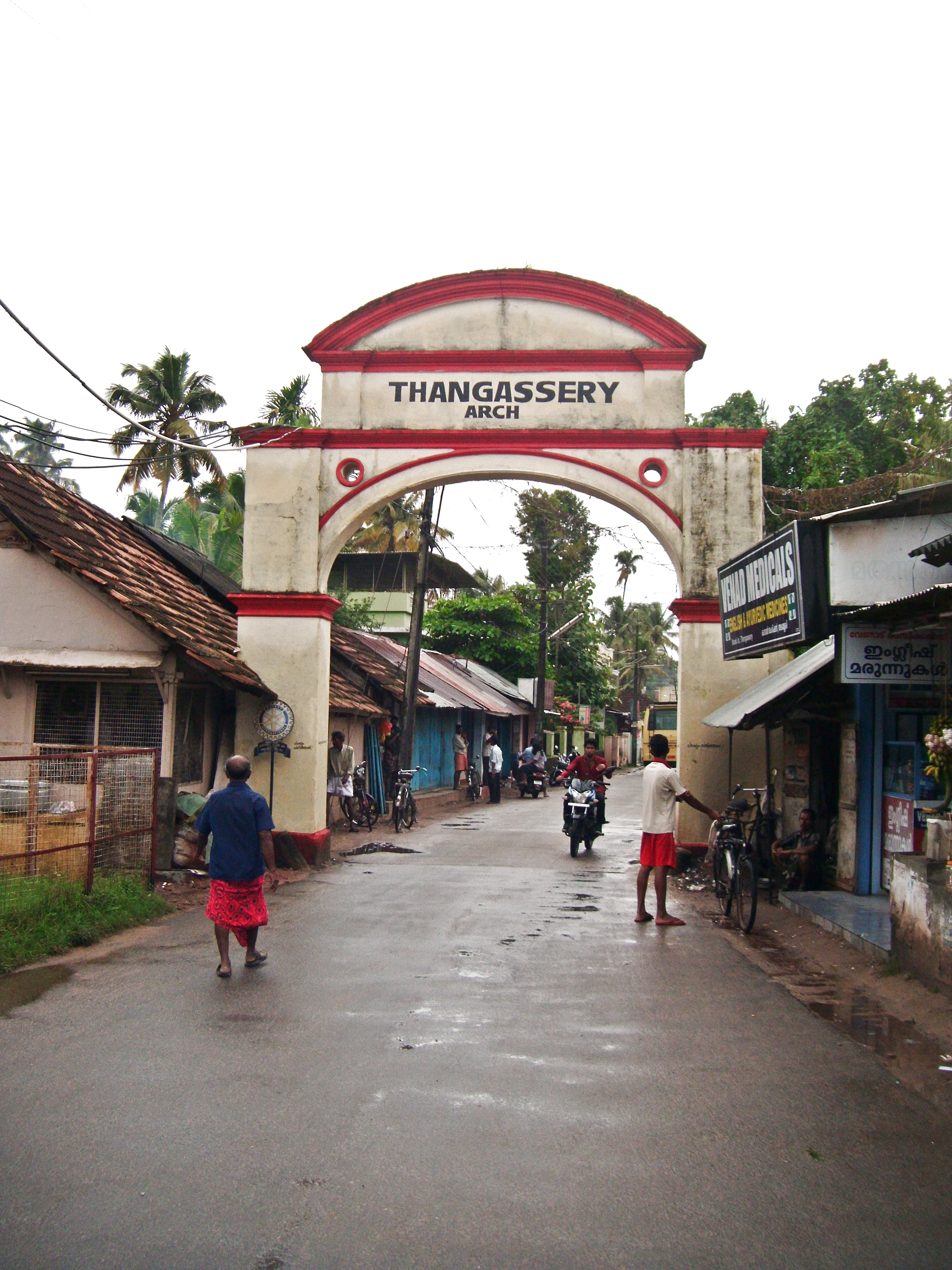
- Tangasseri arch
- Nickname: Tangy
- Location in Kerala, India Tangasseri (Kerala) Tangasseri (India)
- Coordinates: 8.884359°N 76.563631°E
- Country: India
- State: Kerala
- District: Kollam

Government
  - Type: Mayor–Council
  - Body: Kollam Municipal Corporation
  - Mayor: A.K Hafeez (INC)
  - MP: N.K Premachandran
  - MLA: Bindhu Krishna
  - District Collector: Devidas N IAS
  - City Police Commissioner: Kiran Narayanan IPS

Area
  - Total: 0.4006 km^{2} (0.1547 sq mi)

Languages
  - Official: Malayalam, English
- Time zone: UTC+5:30 (IST)
- PIN: 691007
- Vehicle registration: KL-02
- Lok Sabha constituency: Kollam
- Civic agency: Kollam Municipal Corporation
- Avg. summer temperature: 34 °C (93 °F)
- Avg. winter temperature: 22 °C (72 °F)
- Website: http://www.kollam.nic.in

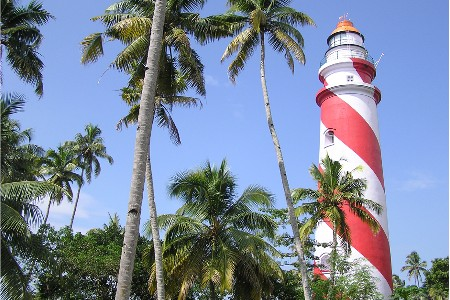
Light House at Thangashery

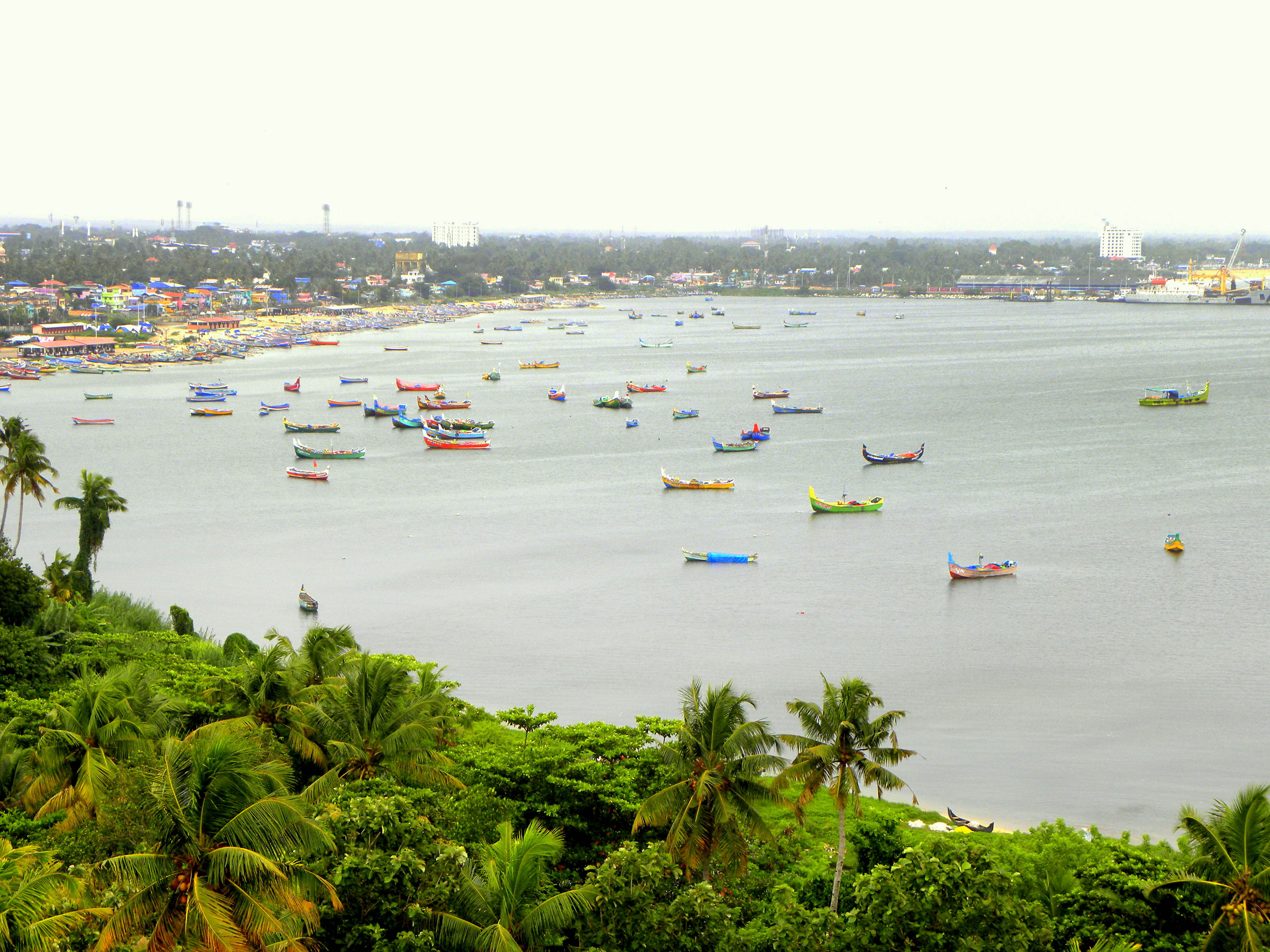
Fishing boats at Thangashery

Tangasseri or Thangassery (Tangy) is a heavily populated beach area on the shores of the Arabian Sea in Kollam city, Kerala, India.

== Location ==
Tangasseri is located about 5 kilometres (3.1 mi) from the city centre and 71 kilometres (44 mi) from Thiruvananthapuram, the state capital. Archaeologists recently discovered Chinese coins and other artefacts along the coast, which reveal the historic background of the location. Kollam Port makes Tangasseri an important place on the world maritime map.

== History ==
In 1502, the Portuguese were the first Europeans to establish a trading centre in Tangasseri and the area soon became a major centre for the pepper trade. Tangasseri's St Thomas Fort, built by the Portuguese in 1517, was destroyed in the subsequent wars with the Dutch.

In 1661, the Dutch took possession of the city. The remains of both the Dutch and Portuguese forts can still be seen in Tangasseri. In the 18th century, the kingdom of Travancore first conquered Kollam, followed by the British in 1795. Tangasseri remains an Anglo-Indian settlement in character, though there are few Anglo-Indians in the population. Tangassery was a part of Malabar District during British Raj.

The Infant Jesus Cathedral in Tangasseri an old Portuguese-built church, remains as a memento of Portuguese rule. The old cathedral was demolished and replaced by a new cathedral at a cost of around ₹4.5 crore (US$480,000); it was consecrated and blessed on 3 December 2005. The metallic cross on the top is one of the largest crosses in India.

== Importance ==
Tangasseri is a picturesque seaside village with a three kilometre long beach on which stands a 144 feet tall lighthouse—a silent sentinel warning seamen since 1902 of the treacherous reefs. There are also ruins of Portuguese and Dutch forts and 18th century churches. The fishery harbour at Tangasseri is a basin for traditional fishermen, achieved by the construction of two breakwaters. The length of the main breakwater is 2100 m and of the leeward breakwater 550 m. This provides sufficient beach length for landing facilities for all appropriate operational craft.

Tangasseri is home to Kerala's oldest schools, Mount Carmel Convent Anglo-Indian Girls High School and Infant Jesus School Kollam.

The State Government of Kerala had submitted a proposal for constructing a sheltered lighterage Port at Thangassery by converting the Thangassery cove into an artificial harbour The Thangassery cove is about 45 miles to the South of theAshtamudi Lake inlet which was proposed to be developed as an Ashing harbour under the Norwegian-Indian Fisheries Community Development Project Hie proposal to convert the Thangassery Cove into an artificial harbour involved the construction canal connecting the proposed port with Ashtamudi Lake. In the meantime, another suggestion was made for developing Thangassery Cove as a fishing-cum-commercial port, if it was found impracticable to develop the Ashtamudi lake inlet. Model expenments in respect of both the scheme were carried out at the Poona Research Station.

The Government of Kerala was asked on 7 January 1959 to examine the reports submitted by the Poona Research Station and to work out comparative costs of both the schemes m the light of the recommendations made m the Reports and forward their proposal to the Government along with a statement showing the comparative costs for the two schemes These are awaited A provision of Rs 42 5 lakhs has been proposed for development works at Thangassery in the Third Plan

== Gallery ==
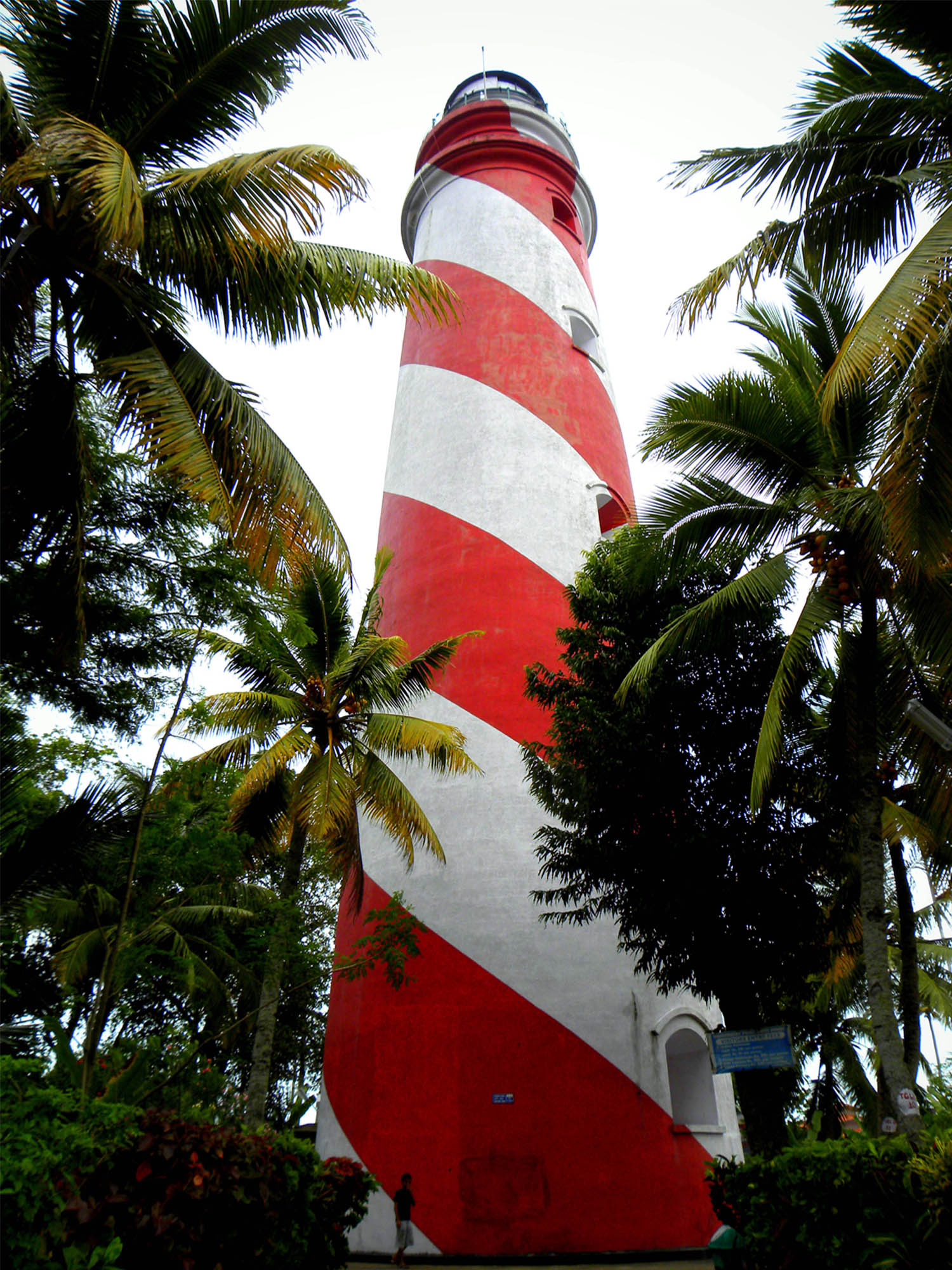
Tangasseri Light House

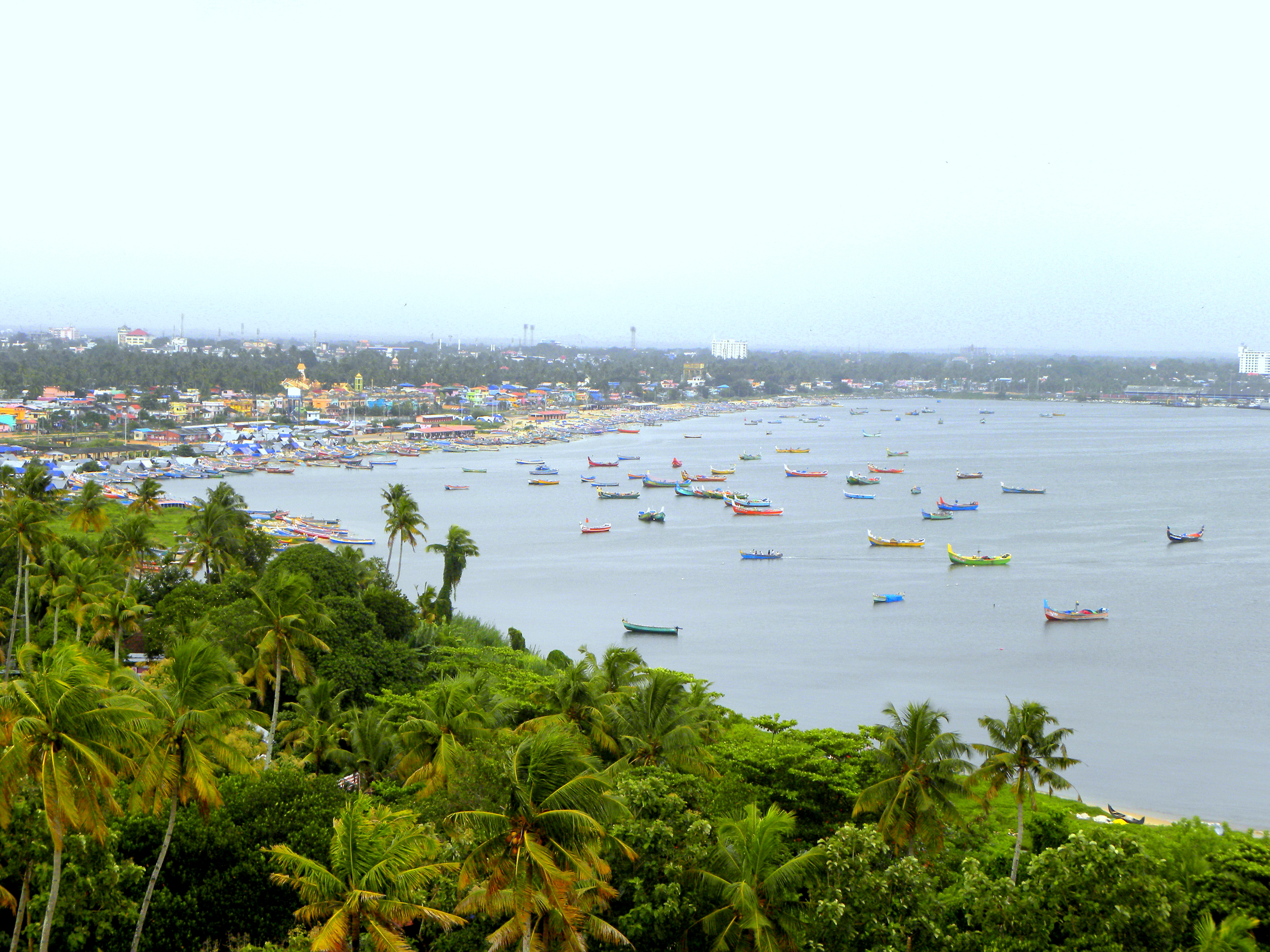
Aerial view of Tangasseri Harbour Area

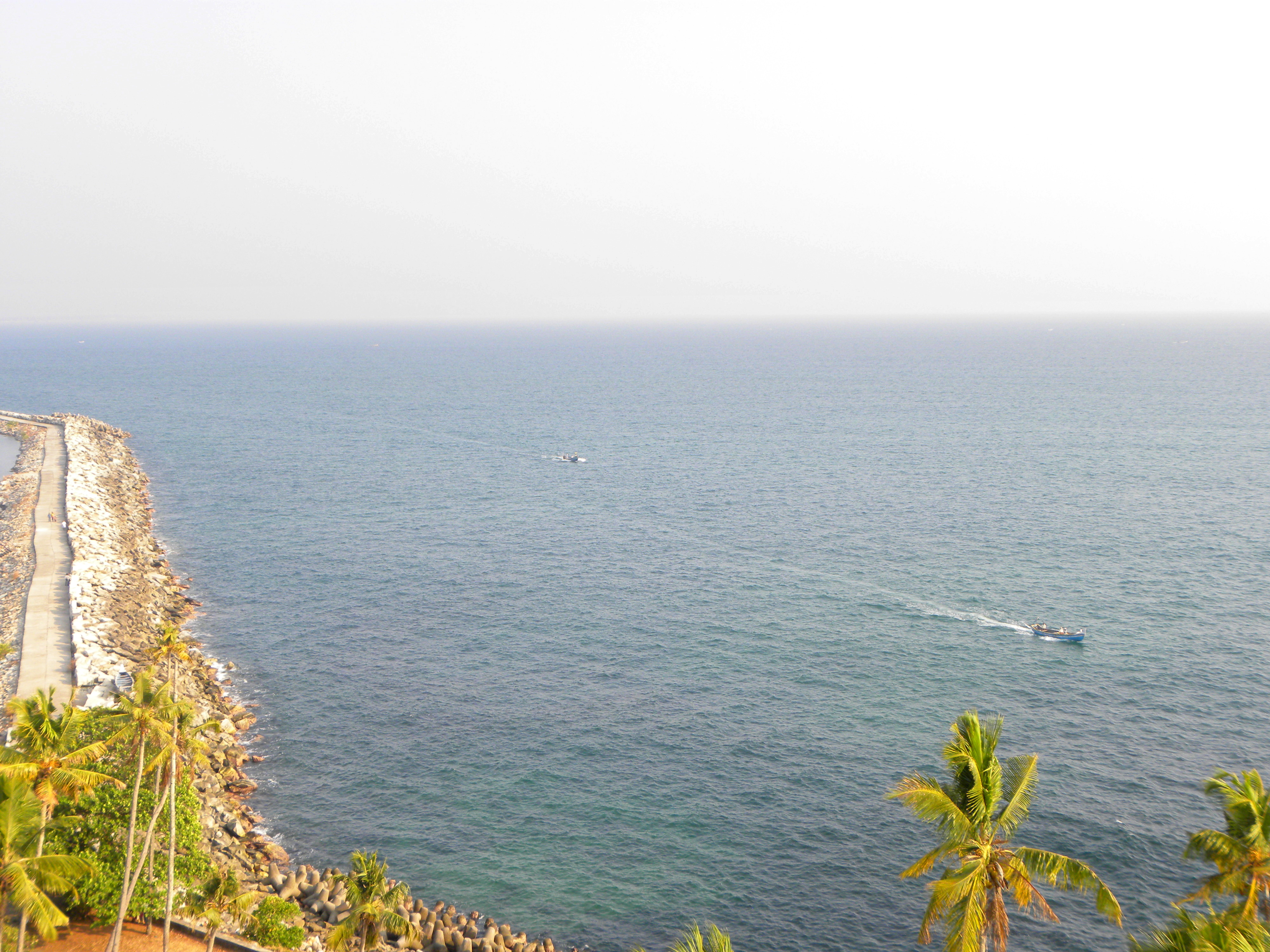
A fishing boat near Tangasseri breakwater

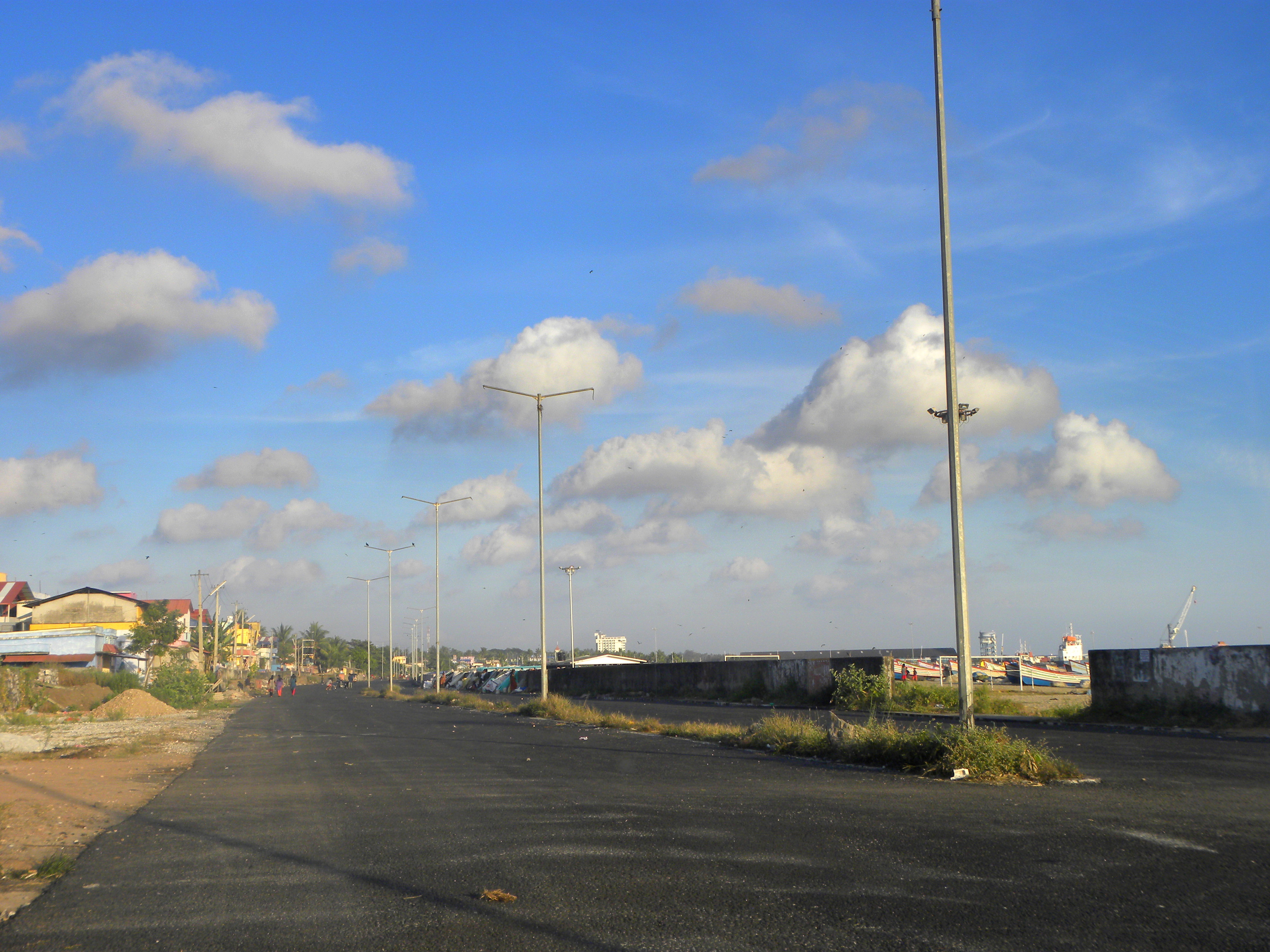
Port Road at Tangasseri

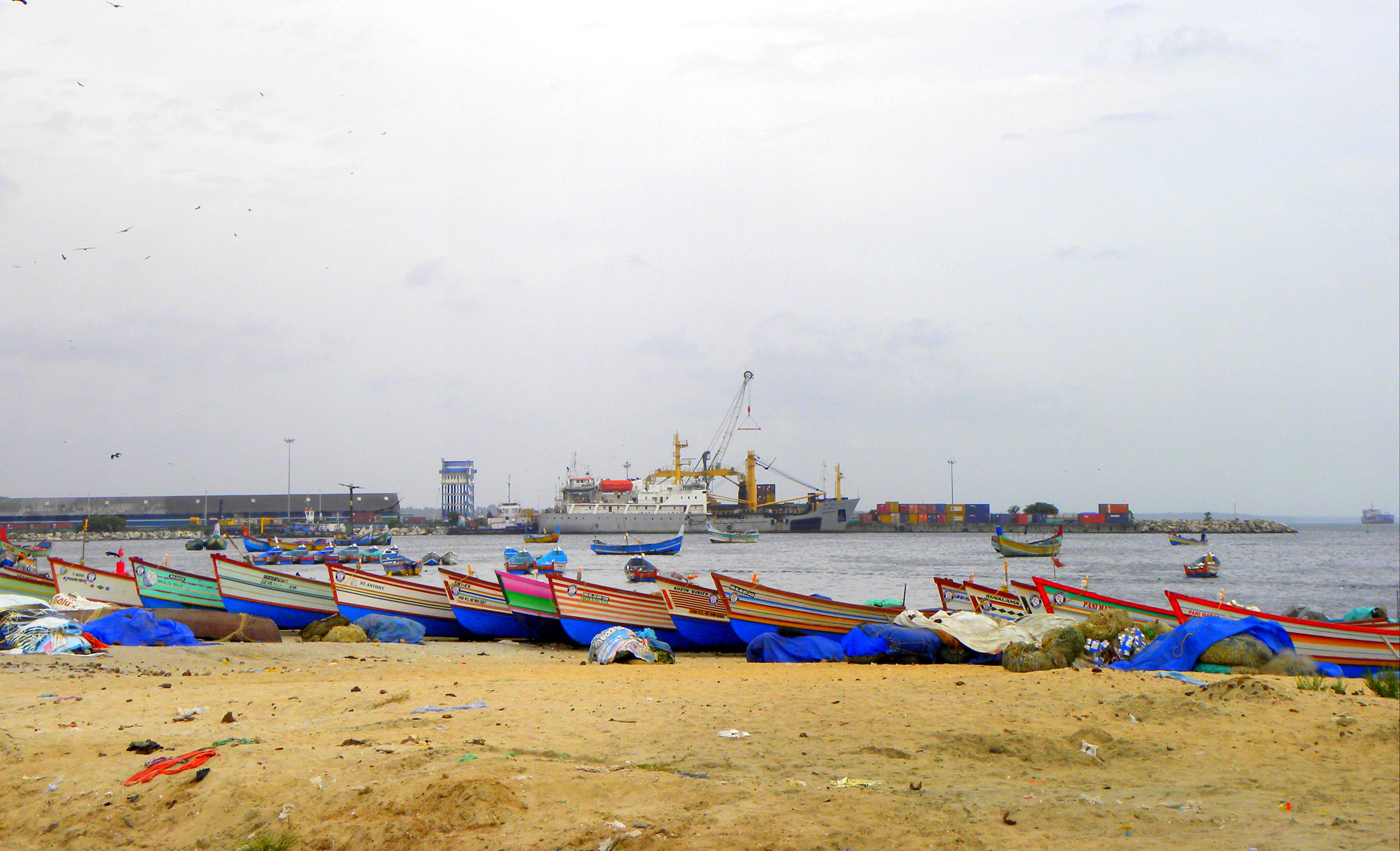
View of Kollam Port from Tangasseri harbour

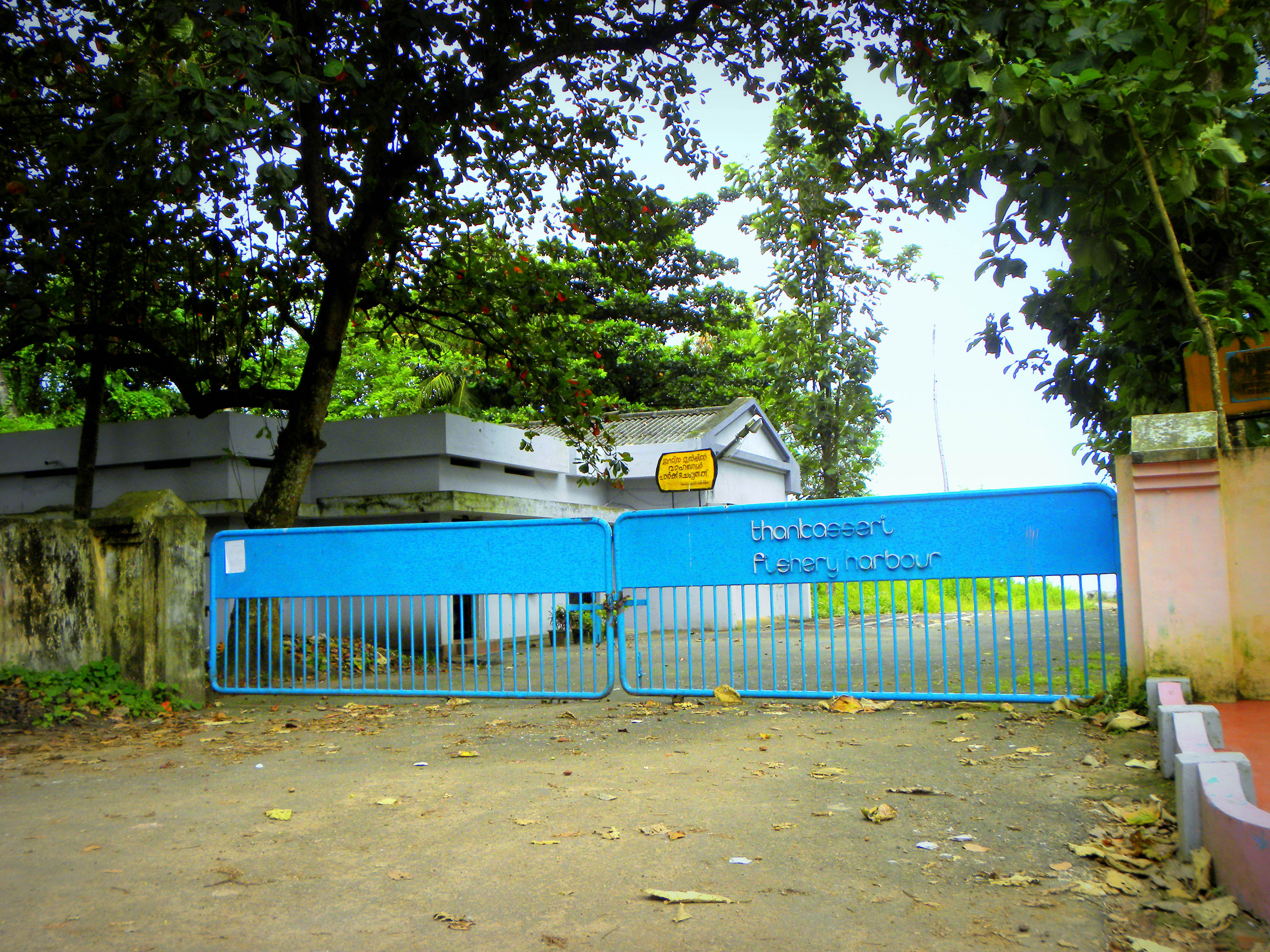
Tangasseri fishing harbour
