= St Thomas Fort =

Ruined fortification in Kerala, India

Fort Thomas (Tangasseri Fort)
- Fortaleza de São Tomé
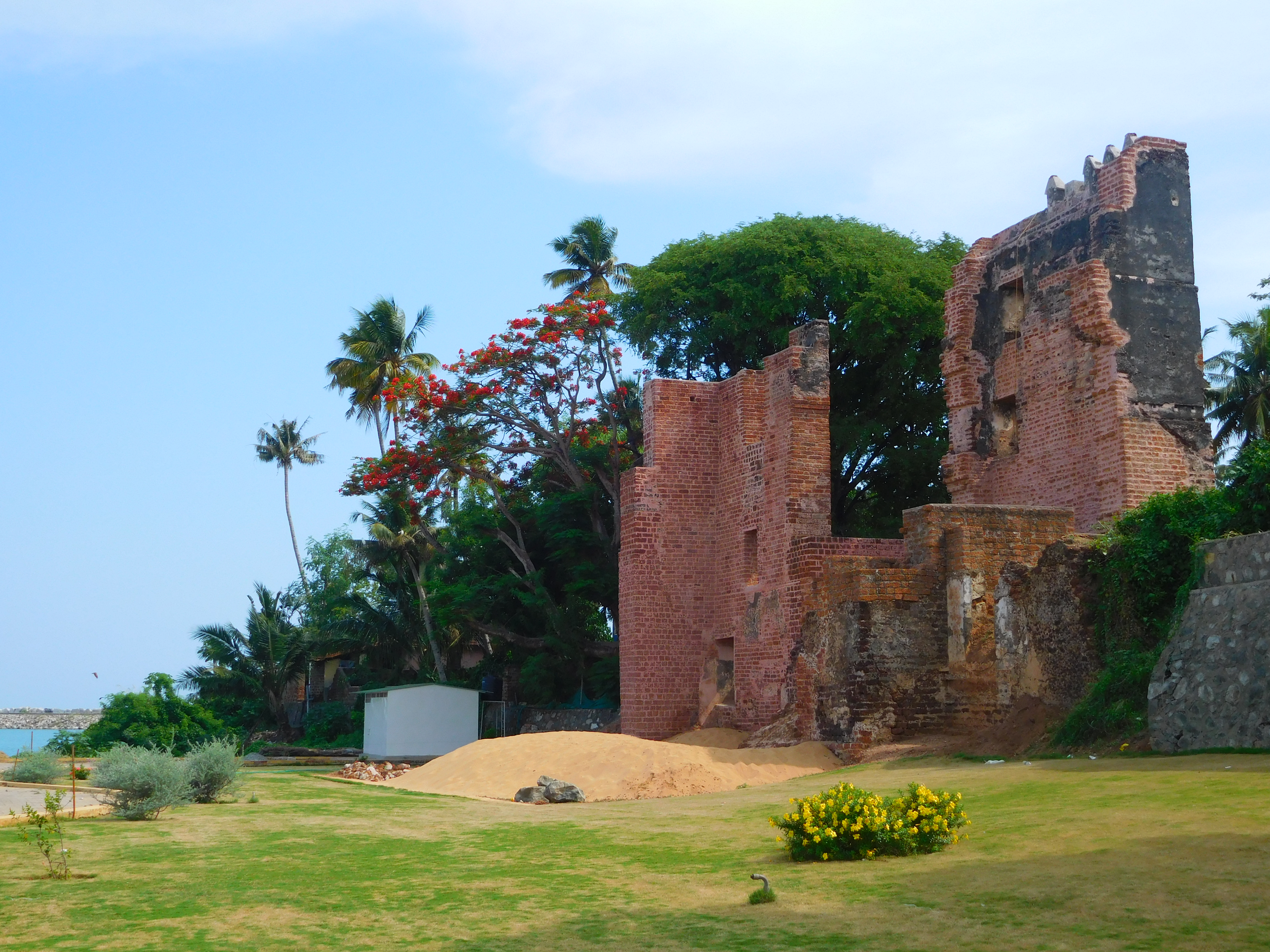
- Front view

- Location within Kollam Location within Kerala Location within India
- 8.8816°N 76.5685°E
- Location: Tangasseri, Kollam city, Kerala, India

History
- Built: 1518

Site notes
- Architect: Portuguese
- Architectural styles: Portuguese Colonial, Built using sandstone and lime mortar

Fort Thomas or St. Thomas Fort or Fortaleza de São Tomé, also known as Tangasseri Fort, is a ruined fort located in the beach town of Tangasseri on the shores of the Arabian Sea in the city of Kollam, Kerala, India. It is located around 5 kilometres (3.1 mi) from the city center of Kollam and 71 kilometres (44 mi) from the state capital Thiruvananthapuram.

== History ==
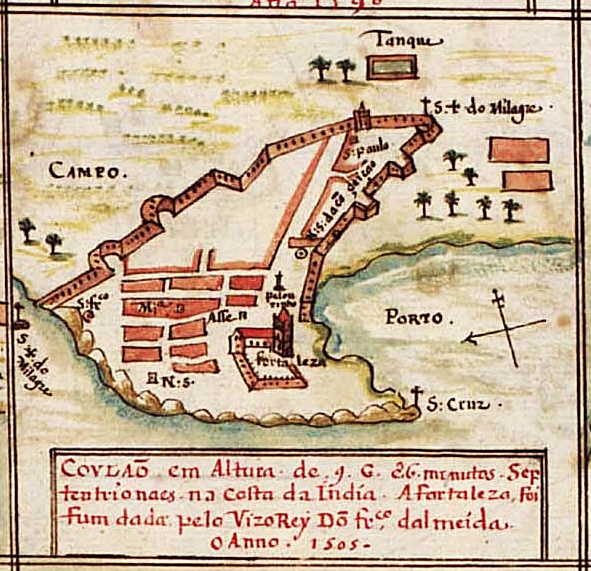
Sketch of Thangaserri, 1505. The fort can be seen close to the shore.

Tangasseri was associated with the Chinese trade from the first millennium AD and later colonised by the Portuguese, Dutch and the British to become the "gold village". According to Historians, Captain Rodriguez came to Quilon and was appointed as the captain of the factory and trade, with permission from the queen. St.Thomas Fort (once known as Fortaleza de São Tomé) was built by the Portuguese under Afonso de Albuquerque for the protection of the newly developed trade. In 1505 the Portuguese established a trading port here, and in 1518 established its sovereignty through the construction of Fort St. Thomas. Later in 1661 the town and the fort were handed over to the Dutch who made it the capital of Dutch Malabar. The Dutch occupied the fort for several years. In 1795, the British East India Company took possession of the fort. In 1823 Fort St. Thomas accepted a lease by Travancore from the British government for a period of twenty years.

Fort St. Thomas was originally around 20 feet (6.1 m) tall. Today, the little remains of the fort, popularly known as "Tangasseri fort" remain facing the beach. At present, the fort is managed by the Archaeological Survey of India (ASI).

== Gallery ==
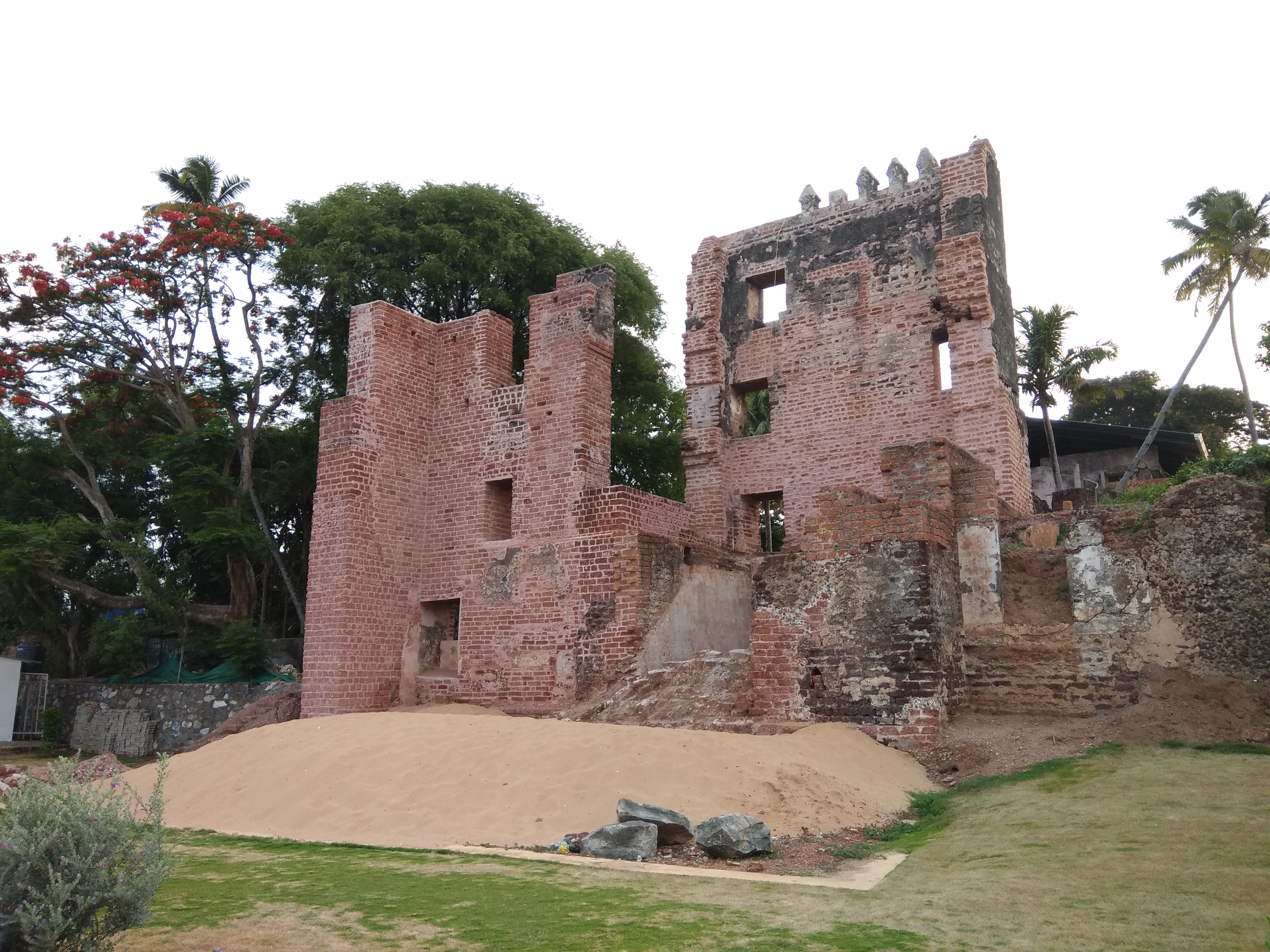
Old – St.Thomas Fort – Right-view

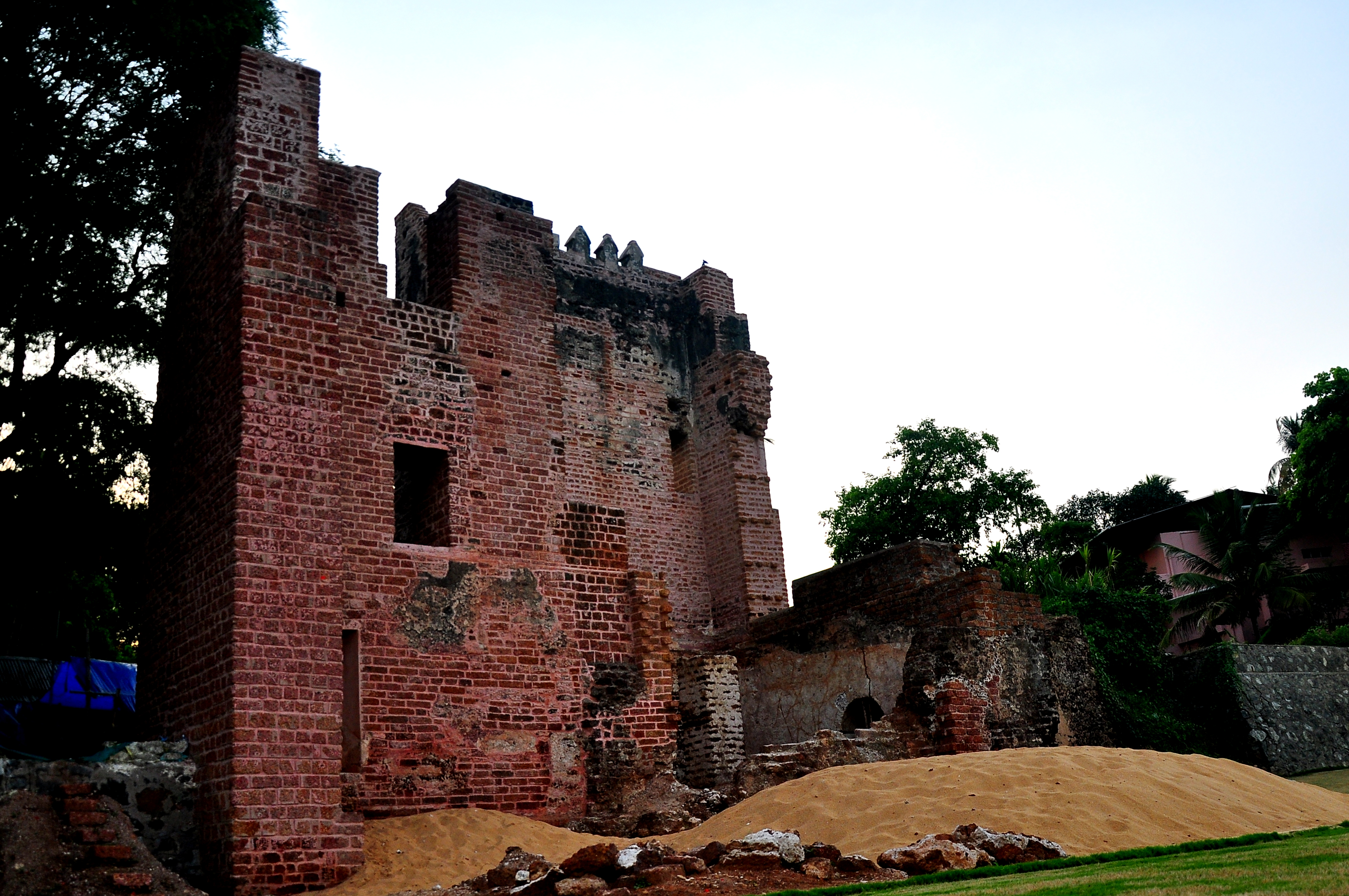
Right View

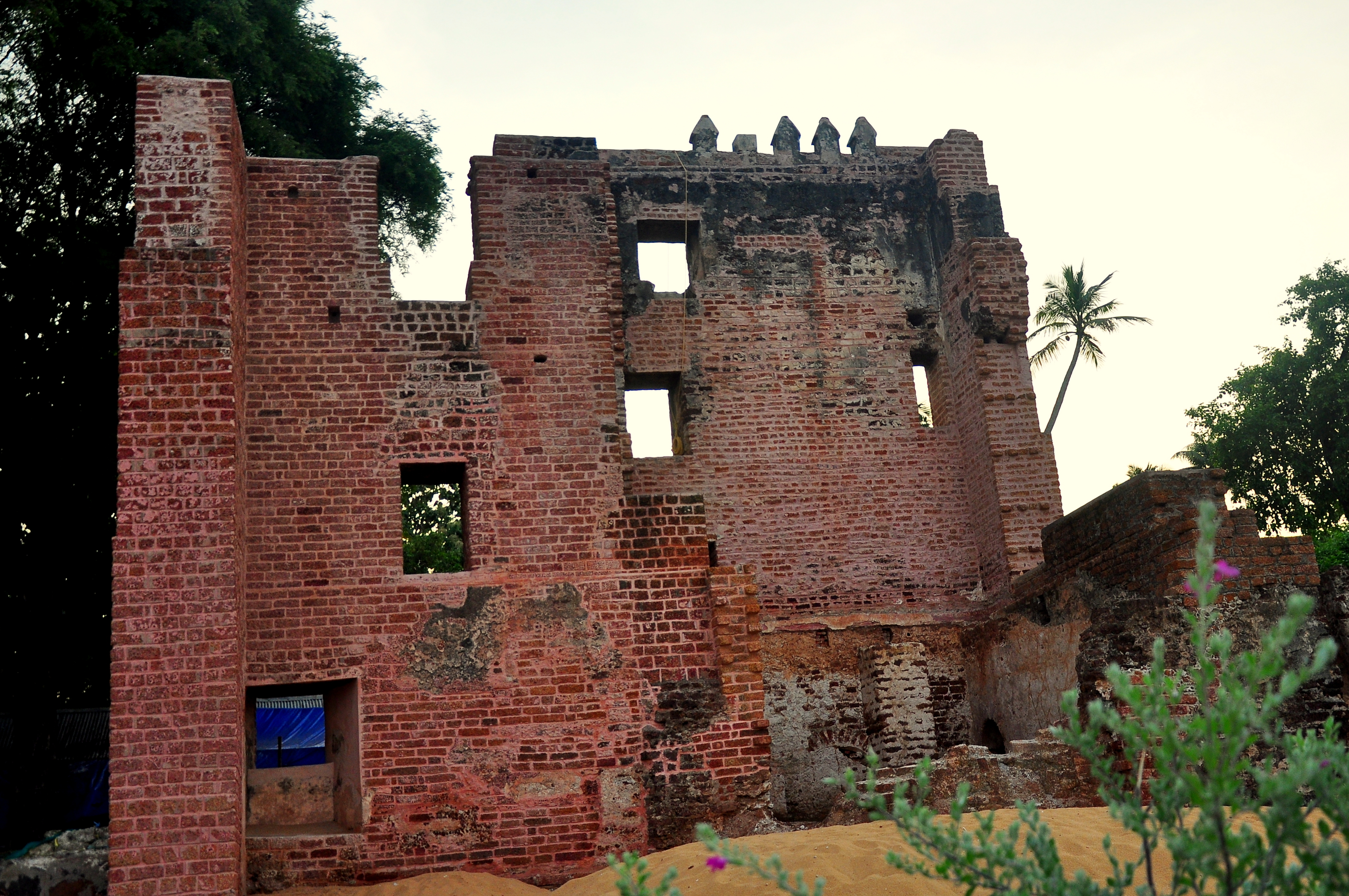
Renovated St.Thomas Fort – Front-view

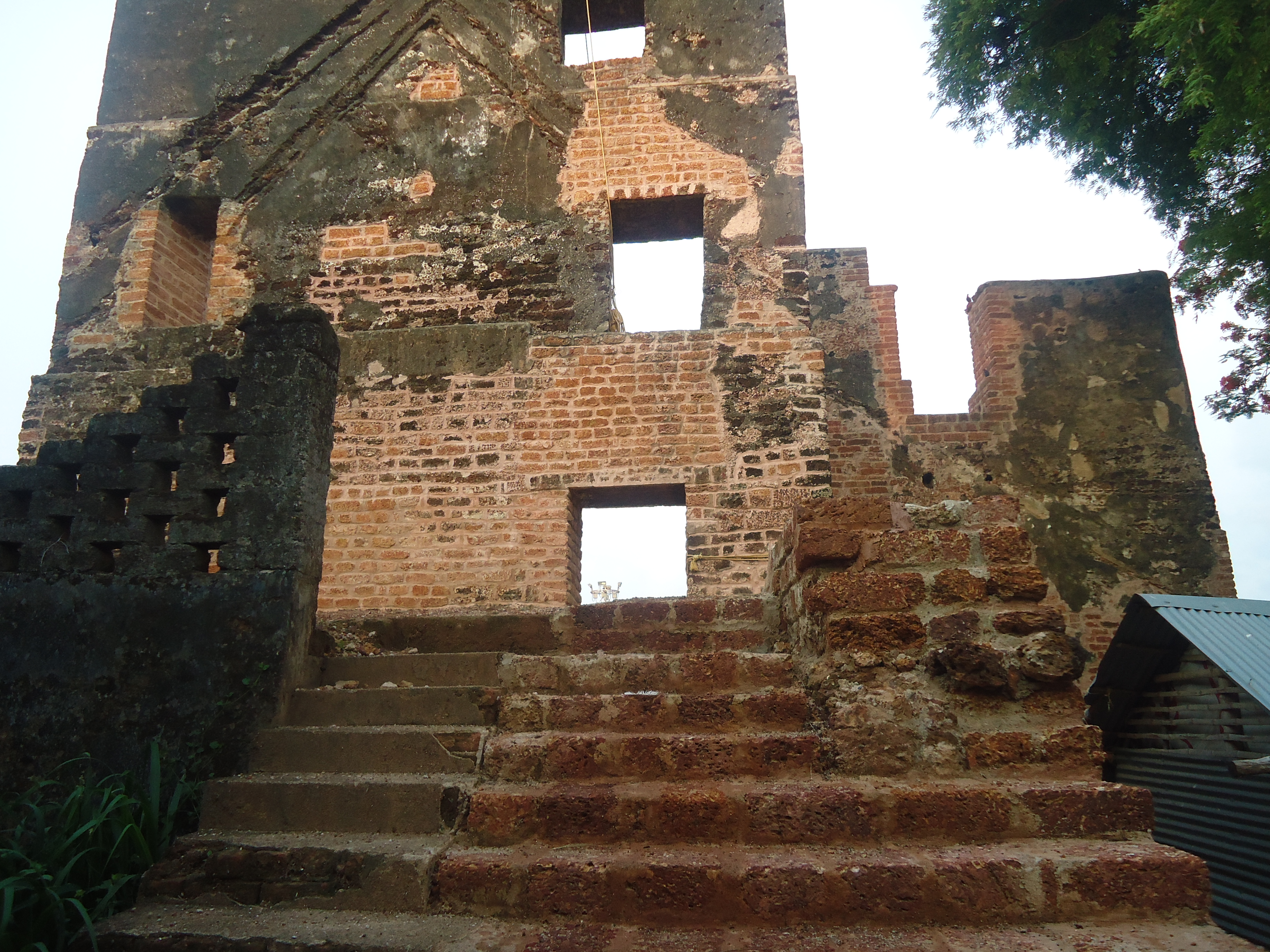
Back Side Entrance

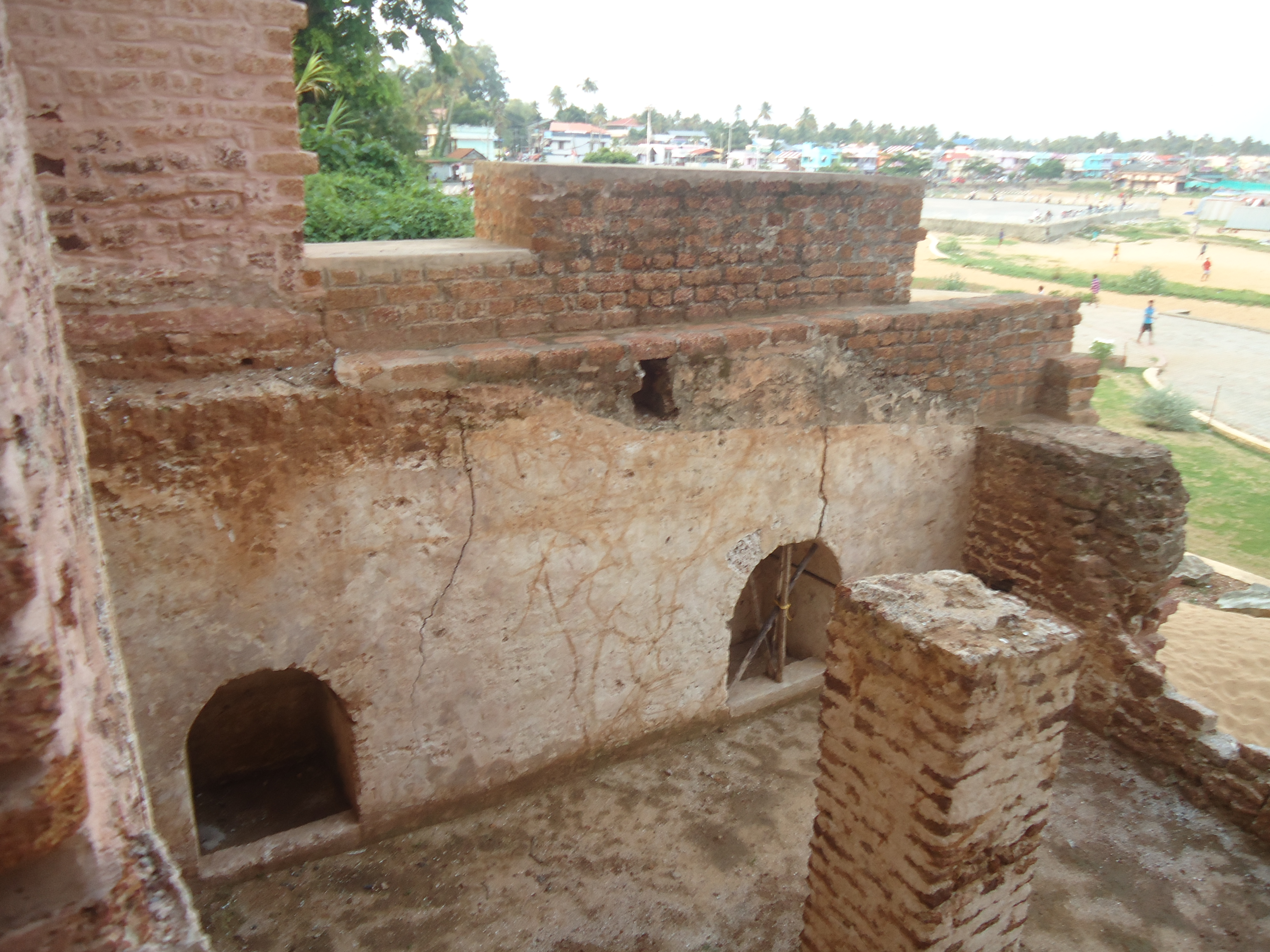
Inside View

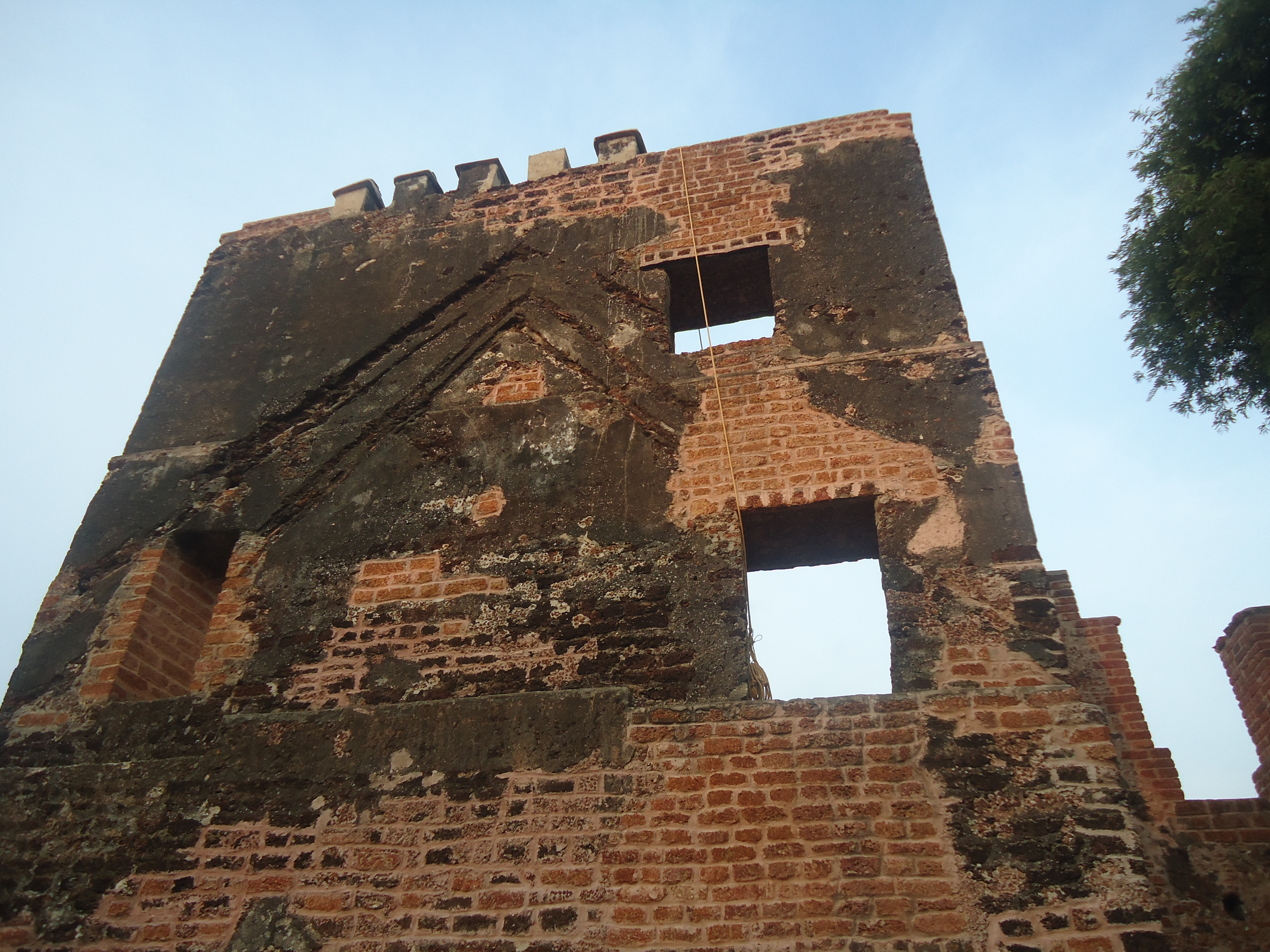
Main Wall

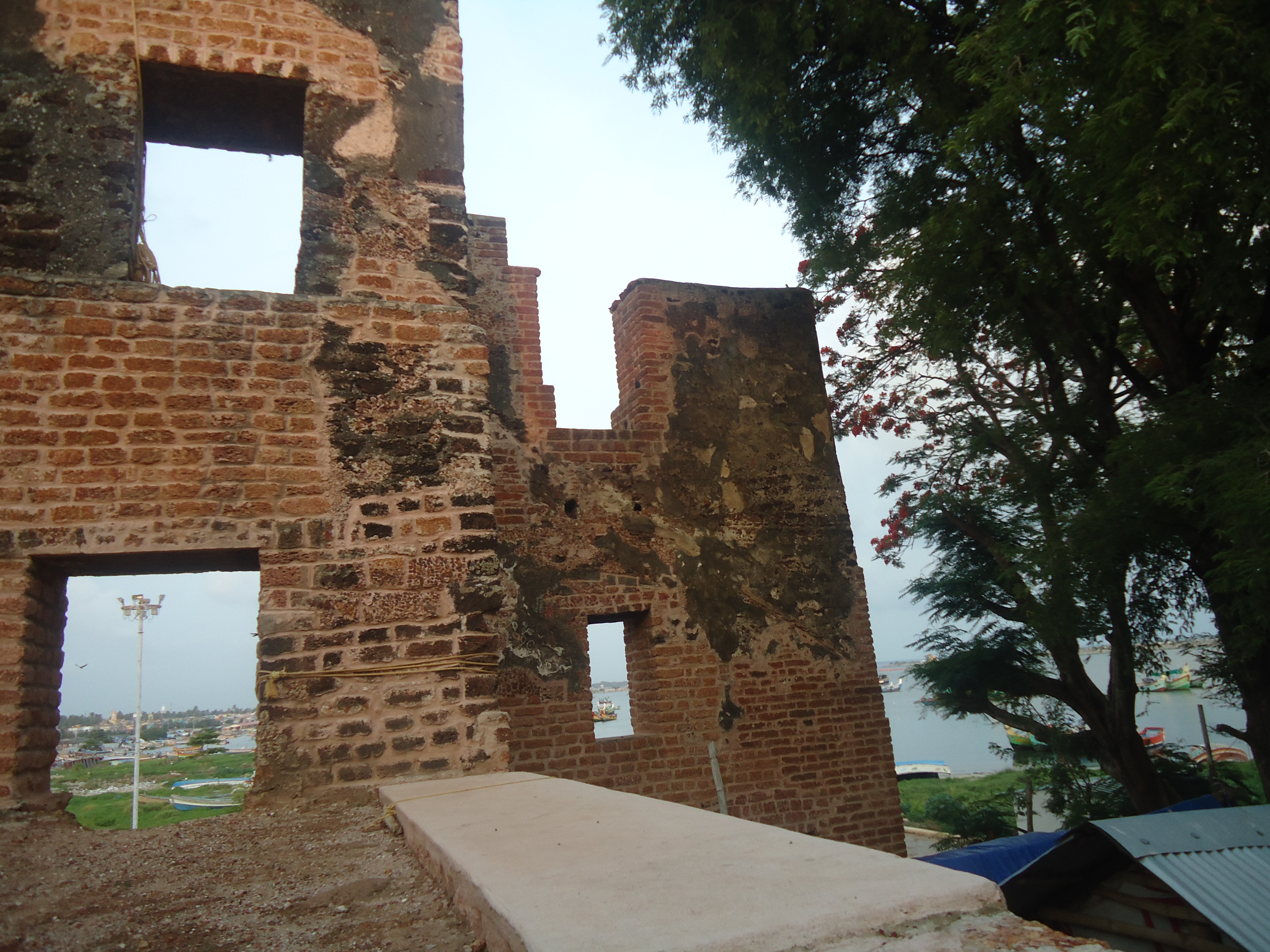
The Windows
