= 2018 in Kerala =

- Centuries
- Decades: 1990s; 2000s; 2010s; 2020s
- See also: List of years in Kerala; History of Kerala

Events in the year 2018 in Kerala.

== Incumbents ==
- Governors of Kerala - P. Sathasivam
- Chief ministers of Kerala - Pinarayi Vijayan

== Events ==
=== January - March ===
- 12 January - First edition of Loka Kerala Sabha held at Thiruvananthapuram.
- 13 January - Jayamol a lady from Kollam Killed her son by strangling
- 19 January - State Transport Commissioner issues orders for implementing uniform colour code for private stage carriage buses in Kerala from 1 February.
- 31 January - Sreejith a youth from Parassala ends his 782 days long solitary protest in front of Kerala Government Secretariat following Central Bureau of Investigation probe in his brother Sreejev's custodial death in 2014.
- 22 February - Madhu, a 30 year old Adivasi man from Attappadi died following mob lynching at Palakkad district.
- 8 March - Supreme Court of India set asides Kerala High Court verdict in Hadiya case.
- 22 March - A college student from Erumely named Jesna Maria James goes missing.

=== April - June ===
- 1 April - Kerala football team defeats West Bengal in Santosh Trophy Final held at Salt Lake Stadium through Penalty shootout.
- 2 May - Nipah virus outbreak in Kerala at Perambra.
- 27 May - Kevin, a 23 year old Dalit Christian from Kottayam district was abducted and murdered in an act of Honor killing for marrying a girl named Neenu Chacko from an affluent Christian family.
- 29 May - Kerala Bharatiya Janata Party leader Kummanam Rajasekharan becomes Governor of Mizoram.
- 27 June - Several key members of Women in Cinema Collective resigned from Association of Malayalam Movie Artists following their decision to bring back rape accused Dileep back to the association.

=== July - September ===
- 2 July - A student of Maharaja's College, Ernakulam and Students' Federation of India activist Abhimanyu stabbed to death by Campus Front of India activists inside college campus.
- 16 August - 2018 Kerala floods the largest flood after Great flood of 99 occurred.
- 8 September - A group of Nun protests at Kochi against attempt by Kerala Police and Catholic Church to protect rape accused bishop Franco Mulakkal.
- 21 September - Bishop Franco Mulakkal arrested following rape allegations.
- 28 September - Sabarimala verdict by Supreme Court of India allows entry of women to the temple.

=== October - December ===
- 31 October - Massive fire in Family Plastics factory at Thiruvananthapuram.
- 1 November - Save Alappad protests against mining of rare earths and ensuing coastal degradation of Alappad started.
- 5 November - Sanalkumar, a 32 year old electrician from Neyyattinkara was killed after being pushed by Deputy superintendent of police Neyyattinkara in front of a moving vehicle following an altercation.
- 8 November - Protests in Kayamkulam by Jacobite Church members following denial of burial of a 95 year old man at a church controlled by Malankara Orthodox faction.
- 13 November - Deputy superintendent of police Neyyattinkara, Harikumar the key accused in Sanalkumar murder case committed suicide in his house at Kallambalam.
- 15 November - Kerala State Road Transport Corporation launched 10 Electric buses and becomes the first South Indian state to roll out Electric vehicles for Road Transport Corporations.

== Deaths ==
- 2 May - Kottayam Pushpanath, 80, writer.
- 13 May - E. C. George Sudarshan, 86, theoretical physicist.
- 8 July - M. M. Jacob, 91, Former governor of Meghalaya.
- 2 October - Balabhaskar, 40, violinist.
- 19 December - Athippatta Moideen Kutty Musliyar Islamic scholar.
- 31 December - Simon Britto Rodrigues, 64, politician.

== See also ==
- History of Kerala
- 2018 in India
- 2018 Kerala floods
