= 2014 in Kerala =

- Centuries
- Decades: 1990s; 2000s; 2010s; 2020s
- See also: List of years in Kerala; History of Kerala

Events in the year 2014 in Kerala.

== Incumbents ==
- Governors of Kerala – Nikhil Kumar (till March), Sheila Dikshit (March–August), P. Sathasivam (from September)
- Chief minister of Kerala – Oommen Chandy

== Events ==
=== January – May ===
- February 15 – P. K. Kunhalikutty inaugurates Cyberpark, Kozhikode, the first IT park in Malabar region.
- March 6 – Jose Chacko Periappuram at Lisie Hospital, Kochi became the first cardiac surgeon in India to conduct a successful heart re-transplant in the country. The replanting was done when a patient who had already received a transplant Heart transplantation developed a heart valve infection.
- March 8 - N. K. Premachandran and RSP leaders leave Left Democratic Front following Communist Party of India (Marxist) taking over Kollam Lok Sabha constituency seat prior to general elections.
- March 11 – Kerala Police takes case against Gail Tredwell, Indiavision etc. for allegations against Mata Amritanandamayi Math.
- April 21 – Sabarinath, the main accused in the multi-crore Total 4 U scam, who went absconding on bail surrendered before Judicial Magistrate Court, Thiruvananthapuram.
- April 25 - Gold ornaments lost from Guruvayur Temple in 1985, recovered from the temple well.
- May 5 – APJ Abdul Kalam Technological University established through an ordinance.
- May 7 - Supreme Court of India gives verdict in Mullaperiyar Dam issue in favour of Tamil Nadu by declaring Kerala law of 2006 which limits the dam height to 136 as unconstitutional.
- May 27 – Professional football club, Kerala Blasters FC established.
- May – Operation Kubera launched by Kerala Police to contain illegal money lending business in Kerala.

=== June – December ===
- June 10 – Kerala Revolutionary Socialist Party (Baby John) led by Shibu Baby John and Revolutionary Socialist Party of India (Marxist) led by Babu Divakaran merges with parent party Revolutionary Socialist Party after 15 years and resultant RSP joints United Democratic Front.
- June 13 – Kerala Home and Education ministries jointly launched 'Clean Campus Safe Campus Project' to spread awareness to wean school students from usage of narcotics and drugs.
- July 25 – Kerala High Court pronounces a verdict that declares eviction and demolishion drive carried out by Special Task Force in Munnar on 2007 as illegal.
- August 22 - Government of Kerala imposes ban on Bars, restricts sale of liquor to Five-star hotels and Kerala State Beverages Corporation outlets and declares that state is planning to achieve Prohibition by 2024.
- November 2 – Kiss of Love protest at Marine Drive, Kochi.
- November – Communist Marxist Party (Aravindakshan) formed by a split in Communist Marxist Party.
- 22 December – Maoist attacks KFC and McDonald's outlets in Palakkad along with two forest outposts in Kerala.

== Deaths ==
- July 17 - J. Sasikumar, 86, Film Director
- November 9 – M. V. Raghavan, 81, politician
- December 25 – N. L. Balakrishnan, 72, actor

== See also ==
- History of Kerala
- 2014 in India
