= 2015 in Kerala =

- Centuries
- Decades: 1990s; 2000s; 2010s; 2020s
- See also: List of years in Kerala; History of Kerala

Events in the year 2015 in Kerala.

== Incumbents ==
Governor of Kerala - P. Sathasivam

Chief minister of Kerala - Oommen Chandy

== Events ==
- 22 January - Communist Party of India (Marxist) worker killed in Nadapuram by Indian Union Muslim League paving way to communal tensions in the region.
- 29 January - a 47 year old security guard rammed and killed at Sobha City Thrissur using a Hummer by Mohammed Nisham owner of Kings Beedi.
- 30 January - Actor Shine Tom Chacko along with 4 models arrested for possessing and trading Cocaine in Kochi.
- 31 January - National Games inauguration at Greenfield International Stadium.
- 14 February - National Gamescomes to an end with Services Sports Control Board and Kerala tops in medal tally.
- 27 February - A meteoroid air burst reported in Kerala.
- March 13 - Left Democratic Front MLA's created ruckus in Kerala Legislative Assembly as part of protests against K. M. Mani during budget session.
- April 7 - Inaugural season of Malabar Premier League football kicked off at Malappuram.
- April 19 - Malayalam news channel Janam TV launched.
- April 24 - Operation Sulaimani launched at Kozhikode district.
- May 1 - Maoist couple Roopesh and P.A. Shyna were arrested by Andhra Pradesh Police from Coimbatore.
- May 2 - Operation Anantha, an Urban flood management program for Thiruvananthapuram initiated by District Disaster Management Authority.
- May 4 - Four young athletes attempts suicide at Sports Authority of India hostel in Alappuzha following harassments.
- May 13 - A major fire occurred in S. M. Street, Kozhikode.
- August 3 - IIT Palakkad started academic courses from temporary facility within Ahalia Health Heritage and Knowledge Village.
- August 26 - A boat collision accident in Kochi claimed 11 lives.
- November 2 - Kerala local elections first phase held.
- December 29 - Supreme Court of India upholds Second Chandy ministry's measures towards Prohibition, curbs on sale of alcohol etc. brought through government order in 2014 August.

== Deaths ==
- March 7 - G. Karthikeyan, 66, politician.

== See also ==
- History of Kerala
- 2015 in India
