= 2019 in Kerala =

- Centuries
- Decades: 1990s; 2000s; 2010s; 2020s
- See also: List of years in Kerala; History of Kerala

Events in the year 2019 in Kerala.

== Incumbents ==
Photo	Post	Name
	The Governor of Kerala (till 5 September 2019)	P. Sathasivam
	The Governor of Kerala (from 6 September 2019)	Arif Mohammad Khan
	Chief minister of Kerala	Pinarayi Vijayan
	Chief Justice of Kerala High Court (till 22 September 2019)	Hrishikesh Roy
	Chief Justice of Kerala High Court (from 11 October 2019)	S. Manikumar

== Events ==
=== January - April ===
- 1 Jan -
  - Vanitha Mathil, world's fourth largest human chain ever made, and the largest formed solely by women under leadership of left organizations between Kasaragod and Thiruvananthapuram to uphold gender equality and protest against gender discrimination.
  - Hindustan Newsprint, Kottayam stopped its operations.
- 2 Jan - Two women, Bindu Ammini and Kanaka Durga, belonging to the traditionally barred age group entered the holy shrine of Sabarimala.
- 3 Jan -
  - State wide Hartal by Sabarimala Karma Samiti and Hindu right wing organisations held.
  - Rashtriya Swayamsevak Sangh activist throw bomb at Nedumangad Police Station.
  - Hindu right wing protestors were attacked by left wing activists during Hartal at Edappal.
- 15 Jan - Prime Minister Narendra Modi inaugurates Kollam Bypass on National Highway 66.
- 25 Jan - Income Tax Department conducts a raid on Cochin Minerals and Rutile Limited and unearth details of bribe payment to politicians including Pinarayi Vijayan.
- 17 Feb - Two Indian Youth Congress workers brutally killed in Periya, Kasaragod allegedly by CPIM killer squad.
- 19 Feb - Municipality of Alappuzha imposes a fine of Rs. 2.73 crores on Lake Palace Resort owned by Thomas Chandy for engaging in illegal constructions and carrying out encroachment on Vembanad backwaters.
- 13 Apr - Kerala High Court acquits all five accused in 2006 Panayikulam SIMI Camp case.
- 23 Apr - 2019 Indian general election in Kerala

=== May - July ===
- 23 May - United Democratic Front (Kerala) sweeps parliament elections in Kerala by winning 19 out of 20 constituencies.
- 16 June - Jose K. Mani is elected as the chairman of Kerala Congress (M).
- 12 July - Additional Chief Secretary, Government of Kerala passes a controversial order that reduces fine imposed by Municipality of Alappuzha on Lake Palace Resort owned by Thomas Chandy for encroachment from 1.17 crores to 34 lakhs.
- 19 July - Justice V Chitambaresh of Kerala High Court makes controversial casteist remarks in a Brahmin conclave at Kochi.

=== August - September ===
- 8 Aug - 2019 Kerala floods and landslides in Kavalapara and Puthumala claims 76 lives.
- 22 Aug - Principal Sessions Court Kottayam calls 2018 Kevin murder as Honor killing and convicts 10 out of the 14 accused in the case.
- 26 Sept - Kerala Police enters St. Mary's Orthodox Syrian Cathedral, Piravom and forcefully evicted Jacobite faction from church premises following ongoing conflict between Jacobite and Orthodox factions following 2017 Supreme Court verdict that give more rights to Orthodox group.

=== October - December ===
- 5 Oct – The key accused in the Koodathayi cyanide murders, Jolly was arrested by Kerala Police.
- 28 Oct - Three Maoists killed by Kerala Police at Manchakatti, in Palakkad district.
- 1 Nov - Kerala Police arrests two students named Alan Shuhaib and Thaha Faisal from Kozhikode under Unlawful Activities (Prevention) Act alleging Maoist links.
- 1 Nov - Two models Ansi Kabeer and Anjana Shajan (Miss Kerala runner up) returning from a DJ party killed in a car crash in Kochi Bypass. They were allegedly chased by Roy George Vayalat the pub owner.
- 20 Nov - A ten-year-old girl died after Snakebite from classroom in Sultan Bathery.
- 6 December - Kerala Bank launched by Pinarayi Vijayan.
- 31 Dec - Kerala Legislative Assembly passes a resolution against Citizenship (Amendment) Act, 2019.

== Deaths ==
=== January ===
14 - Lenin Rajendran, 67, Film director.

=== February ===
1 - Thuppettan, 89, writer.

=== March ===
14 - Rosamma Chacko, 91, politician.

27 - Ashitha (writer), 62

=== April ===
3 - V. Viswanatha Menon, 92, politician

9 - K. M. Mani, 86, politician

13 - D. Babu Paul, 78, Bureaucrat

=== May ===
9 - Eranjoli Moosa, 79, Mappila song singer.

17 - Kadavoor Sivadasan, 87, politician

=== July ===
12 - M. J. Radhakrishnan, cinematographer.

26 - Attoor Ravi Varma, 88, poet

=== September ===
17 - Sathaar, 67, actor.

=== October ===
1 - C. K. Menon, 70, entrepreneur.

=== November ===
10 - T. N. Seshan, 86, bureaucrat and former election commissioner.

12 - Raju Mathew, 82, film producer.

=== December ===
10 - Lily Thomas, 92, lawyer.

20 - Thomas Chandy, politician and business man

21 - Ramachandra Babu, 72, cinematographer.

== See also ==
- History of Kerala
- 2020 in Kerala
- 2019 in India
