= 2016 in Kerala =

- Centuries
- Decades: 1990s; 2000s; 2010s; 2020s
- See also: List of years in Kerala; History of Kerala

Events in the year 2016 in Kerala, India.

== Incumbents ==
Governor of Kerala - P. Sathasivam

Chief minister of Kerala - Oommen Chandy (till May), Pinarayi Vijayan (from May)

== Events ==
- January 19 - Former Ambassador T. P. Sreenivasan assaulted by Students' Federation of India workers at Global Education Summit venue in Thiruvananthapuram.
- February 17 - Kerala Police launched Cumbersome project. A smart policing and cyber policing initiative.
- February 29 - Kerala Police arrests promoters of mPhone, Anto Augustine and Josekutty Augustine before launch on count of Mango Phone Scam.
- March 9 -
  - Radical Islamic groups protests attacks and imposes online boycott on Mathrubhumi following a mention of Prophet in a column named AppTalks.
  - Janadhipathya Kerala Congress formed through a split from the Kerala Congress (M).
- April 10 - Puttingal temple fire
- April 28 - Jisha murder case
- May 16 - 2016 Kerala Legislative Assembly election
- June 15 - A terror outfit that supports Al-Qaeda carried out low intensity Improvised explosive device blasts in Collectorate, Kollam.
- June - Allegations of illegal land conversion around Kannur Medical College, Anjarakandy. Vigilance enquiry on transfer of 300 acre land belonging to Cinnamon Estate from its owners to Markazu Saqafathi Sunniyya and Kanthapuram A. P. Aboobacker Musliyar to Prestige Trust that runs AIC.
- November 7 - Pulimurugan became the first Malayalam movie to cross 100 crore in box office.

== Deaths ==
- January 25 - Kalpana (Malayalam actress), 50
- March 6 - Kalabhavan Mani, 45, actor.
- March 24 - V. D. Rajappan, 72, actor.
- March 25 - Jishnu Raghavan, 37, actor.

== See also ==
- History of Kerala
- 2016 in India
