= 2010 in Kerala =

- Centuries
- Decades: 1990s; 2000s; 2010s; 2020s
- See also: List of years in Kerala; History of Kerala

Events in the year 2010 in Kerala.

== Incumbents ==
Governor of Kerala - R. S. Gavai

Chief minister of Kerala - V. S. Achuthanandan

== Events ==
- January 2 - Taluk hospital at Manjeri upgraded as District Hospital, Manjeri.
- February 24 - Mohan Bhagwat addresses Pranta Sanghik (state assembly) of RSS at the Asramam Maidan in Kollam on his maiden visit to state after becoming RSS chief and the event was attended by over 1,00,000 uniformed Swayamsevak from across the state. The CPI(M) mayor of Kollam Municipal Corporation N Padmalochanan attends the event.
- April 4 - Institute of Fashion Technology Kerala opened at Vellimon, Kollam district.
- April 30 - Kerala Congress (Joseph) leaves Left Democratic Front and merges with Kerala Congress (M).
- May 4 - Kerala Maritime Institute established at Neendakara.
- May 12 - Kollam–Punalur broadgauge rail inaugurated by E. Ahamed.
- July 4 - Assault on T. J. Joseph by Popular Front of India activists in the name of Blasphemy.
- July 8 - Brake wires of Nilambur–Shoranur Passenger Train found snapped in Nilambur Road railway station as part of an alleged sabotage attempt.
- August 8 - Malabar Wildlife Sanctuary created as 16th wildlife sanctuary in Kerala.
- August 15 - Nilakal Orthodox Diocese created.
- September 10 - A policeman from Kalikavu station got killed using a country made gun while executing a warrant. The perpetrator Mujeeb and wife found dead in nearby estate two days afterwards.
- November 8 - In Shoranur, Ottapalam municipalities and Kannadi panchayath, UDF regains power with help of Janakeeya Vikasana Samithi, a party floated by CPI(M) rebels under the leadership of M.R. Murali, chairman of Shoranur municipality.
- December 9 - Fire accident in S. M. Street destroys eight shops in Kozhikode.
- Kochi Tuskers Kerala founded as an Indian Premier League team.

== Deaths ==
- 10 February - K. N. Raj, 86, economist.
- 13 April - Santhosh Jogi, 34, actor.
- 23 December - K. Karunakaran, 92, politician.

== See also ==
- History of Kerala
- 2010 in India
