= 2003 in Kerala =

- Centuries
- Decades: 1980s; 1990s; 2000s; 2010s; 2020s
- See also: List of years in Kerala; History of Kerala

Events in the year 2003 in Kerala.

== Incumbents ==
Governors of Kerala – Sikander Bakht

Chief ministers of Kerala – A. K. Antony

== Events ==
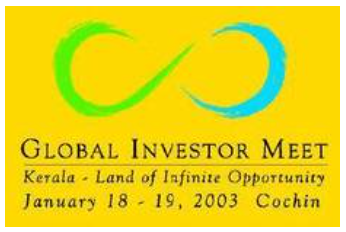
Logo of Global Investors Meet

- January 13 - Joseph Cooper a US citizen involved in Pentecost activities attacked at Kilimanoor.
- January 18 - The two day Global Investors Meet organized by Government of Kerala begins at Kochi. The event was inaugurated by Atal Bihari Vajpayee and A. K. Antony.
- February 19 - Muthanga firing incident.
- May 2 – The second Marad massacre took place, killing nine.
- May 13 – The first heart transplantation surgery in Kerala conducted at Medical Trust Hospital, Kochi under the leadership of Dr. Jose Chacko Periappuram.
- May 24 - P. C. Thomas, Member of parliament from Muvattupuzha Lok Sabha constituency becomes Minister of State of Law and Justice in Second Vajpayee ministry.
- July 14 – Kerala based News broadcasting TV channel Indiavision launched.
- September 28 - Sushma Swaraj meets and hugs two HIV infected kids who faces social stigma.
- December 29 - Chief minister of Kerala A. K. Antony opens the first reach of Goshree bridges between Ernakulam and Bolghatty Island.
- Kerala observed 123 Hartal in 2003. Thereby effectively reducing working days to 160.

== Deaths ==
- July 16 – K. P. A. C. Azeez, 68, actor.
- October 10 - Nawab Rajendran, 53, journalist and activist.

== See also ==
- History of Kerala
- 2003 in India
