= 2013 in Kerala =

- Centuries
- Decades: 1990s; 2000s; 2010s; 2020s
- See also: List of years in Kerala; History of Kerala

Events in the year 2013 in Kerala.

== Incumbents ==
Governors of Kerala - H. R. Bhardwaj (additional charge till March), Nikhil Kumar (from March)

Chief minister of Kerala - Oommen Chandy

== Events ==
- April 1 - National Pension System came into force among state government employees of Kerala.
- March 10 - Lulu International Shopping Mall, Kochi inaugurated.
- March 20 - Finance Minister K. M. Mani announces that 12 new Taluks will be formed in Kerala namely Kattakkada, Varkala, Punalur, Konni, Idukki, Chalakkudy, Pattambi, Kondotty, Thamaraserry, Iritty, Vellarikkundu and Manjeshwaram.
- May 5 - Kaumudy TV by Kerala Kaumudi group launched.
- May 15 - Malayali cricketer and Rajasthan Royals player S. Sreesanth arrested by Delhi Police in connection with 2013 Indian Premier League spot-fixing and betting case.
- June 2 - Kerala Seaplane, first sea plane in mainland India launched at Kollam.
- June 10 - Ripper Jayanandan jail break from Central Prison, Poojappura.
- June 23 - A women named Noby Augustine filed sexual harassment complaint against Jose Thettayil and son Adarsh.
- June 25 - Second Chandy ministry decides to give Rs. 2500 monthly pension to all 826 members of former Zamorin clan.
- June 28 - Kerala Chief Minister Oommen Chandy's personal assistant Tenny Joppan arrested in connection with 2013 Kerala solar panel scam.
- August 12 - Left Democratic Front protests by blocking all gates of Kerala Government Secretariat.
- September 9 - Kerala Police arrests Ripper Jayanandan from Thrissur
- November 15 - Krishnagiri Stadium, Wayanad district inaugurated.
- December 1 - Kollam MEMU Shed commissioned.

== Deaths ==
- February 7 - K. K. Nair, Politician, 82.
- March 26 - Sukumari, 72, actress.
- June 27 - A. C. Shanmughadas, 74, politician.
- July 3 - Thengamam Balakrishnan, 86, politician.
- August 2 - V. Dakshinamoorthy, 93, Musician
- December 16 - Uthradom Thirunal Marthanda Varma, 91, titular head of Travancore royal family.

== See also ==
- History of Kerala
- 2013 in India
