= 2017 in Kerala =

- Centuries
- Decades: 1990s; 2000s; 2010s; 2020s
- See also: List of years in Kerala; History of Kerala

Events in the year 2017 in Kerala.

== Incumbents ==
Governor of Kerala – P. Sathasivam

Chief minister of Kerala – Pinarayi Vijayan

== Events ==
- January 3 – Kerala Rail Development Corporation is incorporated.
- January 6 - Jishnu Pranoy, an 18 year old engineering student of Nehru College of Engineering and Research Centre commits suicide following torture from college authorities.
- January 10 - Supreme Court of India bench headed by Jagdish Singh Khehar asks Government of Kerala to pay Rs. 500 crores of compensation to 5200 Endosulfan victims of Kasaragod district within 90 days.
- February 17 - Sexual assault against Malayalam cinema actress Bhavana by a gang who was allegedly sent by Dileep.
- February 25 - Pinarayi Vijayan addresses a Souhardha Rally organised by Communist Party of India (Marxist) in Mangalore defying threats from Sangh Parivar.
- March 6 - In relation to corruption case in Malabar Cements Limited, industrialist V.M. Radhakrishnan surrendered before Vigilance and Anti Corruption Bureau, Kerala.
- March 21 - Riyas Moulavi, Muezzin of a Mosque in Kasaragod stabbed and killed within mosque premises by allegedly Rashtriya Swayamsevak Sangh workers.
- March 26 – Minister A. K. Saseendran resigns following sexual misconduct charges.
- March 31 - State Bank of Travancore merged with State Bank of India.
- April 5 - A psychopath son kills four family members including his parents in Nanthancode.
- April 10 - Road traffic through Main Central Road diverted through Bailey bridge due to structural issues of Enathu Bridge.
- June 15 - Communist Party of India issues strong warning to its Nattika Assembly constituency MLA Geetha Gopi for ostentatious wedding of her daughter in Guruvayur.
- June 17 - Prime Minister Narendra Modi inaugurates Kochi Metro.
- July 3 – The Supreme Court of India declares the Constitution of the Malankara Orthodox Church legal and valid, and applicable to all the parishes under the control of both Jacobite and Orthodox factions in the K.S. Varghese & Others v/s St Peter's & Paul's Syrian Orthodox Church & Others case.
- October 21 – District magistrate Alappuzha, T. V. Anupama submits a report to Government of Kerala which confirms that the Lake Palace resort owned by Minister of Transport Thomas Chandy violated the Kerala Conservation of Paddy Land and Wet Land Act 2008 by encroaching upon Kuttanad paddy fields and Vembanad wetlands.
- November 1 - Women in Cinema Collective formed.
- November 15 – Minister of Transport Thomas Chandy resigns following allegations about him over Lake Palace resort, Alappuzha.
- November 20 - Regional Passport Office Malappuram stops its operation and gets merged with RPO Kozhikode.
- November - Cyclone Ockhi claims 200 lives in Kanyakumari and more than 60 in Kerala.

== Deaths ==
- March 13 – Diphan, 45, film director
- April 13 – Munshi Venu, 63, actor
- May 20 - Mathunny Mathews, 81, businessman famous for 1990 airlift of Indians from Kuwait.
- August 28 – Santhi Mohandas, 36, dancer and wife of Bijibal
- October 24 – I. V. Sasi, 69, film director
- November 30 – Kalabhavan Abi, 52, mimicry artist

== See also ==
- History of Kerala
- 2017 in India
