= Chandran (name) =

Chandran is a given name and surname. Notable people with the name include:

- Charithra Chandran, English actress
- Ripper Chandran, Indian serial killer
- Shankari Chandran (born 1974/75), British-Australian novelist
- Chandran Kukathas, Malaysian-born Australian political theorist
