= 1958 in Kerala =

- Centuries
- Decades: 1950s; 1960s; 1970s
- See also: List of years in Kerala; History of Kerala

Events in the year 1958 in Kerala.

== Incumbents ==
Governor of Kerala -

- Burgula Ramakrishna Rao

Chief minister of Kerala –

- E. M. S. Namboodiripad

Chief Justice of Kerala High Court

- Justice K.T. Koshy

== Events ==
- 29 April - Food poisoning from flour containing Parathion claimed 108 lives in Kerala. The gravest incident occurred at a Lok Sahayak Sena camp in Sasthamkotta where 74 got killed.
- 19 May - Rosamma Punnoose won the first ever byelection to state assembly from Devikulam Assembly constituency. She who won the constituency was removed by court intervention which led to byelection.
- 26 July - Two Revolutionary Socialist Party affiliated cashew workers killed in police firing at Chandanathope.
- 20 October - Two tea plantation workers including a pregnant women killed in police firing at Munnar.

=== Dates unknown ===
- Liberation Struggle (Kerala)

== Births ==
- 28 April - Jose Chacko Periappuram cardiac surgeon who performed first Heart transplantation in state.
- 26 June - Suresh Gopi - actor and politician.

== Deaths ==
- 13 March - Vallathol Narayana Menon - Poet (b.1878)

== See also ==
- History of Kerala
- 1958 in India
