= 2006 in Kerala =

- Centuries
- Decades: 1980s; 1990s; 2000s; 2010s; 2020s
- See also: List of years in Kerala; History of Kerala

Events in the year 2006 in Kerala.

== Incumbents ==
Governors of Kerala - R.L. Bhatia

Chief ministers of Kerala - Oommen Chandy (until May), V. S. Achuthanandan (starting in May)

== Events ==
- 7 January – K. G. Balakrishnan inaugurates National University of Advanced Legal Studies.
- 28 January - AIR Manjeri FM commence broadcasting as Dreamz FM.
- 11 February - Yogesh Kumar Sabharwal, Chief Justice of India inaugurates the new building of Kerala High Court.
- 25 February –
  - A nun named Ancy Varghese aged 28 found dead in a well adjacent to the Bethany Monastery, Perunad, Ranni.
  - A span of Dalavapuram - Pallikodi Bridge under construction collapsed into Ashtamudi Lake.
- 3 March – Twin blasts near Kozhikode bus stand in Mavoor Road.
- 22 April – First phase of 2006 Kerala Legislative Assembly election..
- 29 April – Second phase of 2006 Kerala Legislative Assembly election.
- 1 July - Government of Kerala gives RTO codes to various Sub-RTO's resulting taking total number of RTO codes in state to KL-60 and new registrations starting from KL-19.
- 23 July - Tantri case involving Sabarimala Temple priest Kantararu Mohanararu.
- 27 July – Chikungunya outbreak detected at Alappuzha district. The state is seeing an outbreak after 30 years.
- 3 August - Sexual harassment allegations against P. J. Joseph for misbehaving with a co-passenger Lakshmi Gopakumar in a Chennai - Kochi Kingfisher Airlines flight.
- 15 August - Five youth arrested near Panayikulam for allegedly organising is a secret meeting of Students' Islamic Movement of India.
- 18 August - The first digital movie in Malayalam cinema, Moonnamathoral released.
- 3 September - a group of friends from Manjummel Kochi, Kerala went to explore the Guna cave as one among them named Subhash fell into the hole. Later he was rescued through huge efforts, mainly by his friend Siju David and locals with the support of police. In 2008 Siju was awarded Jeevan Raksha Padak for his Bravery and based on this incident Manjummel boys was released in 2024.
- 4 September - Minister P. J. Joseph resigns from Achuthanandan ministry following allegations of misconduct.
- 14 November - Salem railway division created by bifurcation of Palakkad railway division. The division reduced route km under Palakkad from 1757 km to 578 km and brought a significant fall in revenue.

== Deaths ==
- May 27 - Oduvil Unnikrishnan, 62, actor
- July 18 V. P. Sathyan, 41, football player
- October 19 - Srividya, 53, actress.
- December 9 - Theetta Rappai, 67, competitive eater.

== See also ==
- History of Kerala
- 2006 in India
