= MK James =

Indian dental surgeon

- Born: May 10, 1933; Cheruvally, Manimala, Kottayam, Kerala, India
- Died: 23 July 2026 (aged 93); Kochi, Kerala, India
- Education: Bombay University, Bonn University, Vienna University
- Occupation: Dental surgeon
- Employer(s): Lisie Hospital, Kochi, Government T D Medical College, Alappuzha, St. John's Medical College, Fertilisers and Chemicals Travancore, Port Trust Hospital, Cochin
- Children: 3

Mooleplackal Kuriakose James (born May 10, 1933) is an Indian dental surgeon known for his contributions to the field of dentistry. He played a significant role in establishing and leading the department of dentistry at Lisie Hospital, one of the oldest private hospitals in Kerala.

== Early life and education ==
James was born on May 10, 1934, in Cheruvally near Manimala, Kottayam district, Kerala, India. He attended the St. Berchman's high school, Changanacherry, and the Loyola College, Madras. He completed his dental education at Nair Hospital Dental College, Bombay University in 1955. He obtained a doctoral degree, Dr. Med. Dent. (DMD) from Bonn University in 1959 and pursued a postgraduate certificate in orthodontics from Vienna University in 1962.

== Career and contributions ==
In 1959, James founded the dental department at Lisie Hospital in Ernakulam and served as its chief. Under his leadership, the department performed modern dental treatments like X-ray based diagnosis, root canal treatment, oral surgery, jaw fracture fixation, reimplantation of teeth - procedures not yet done in South India, except at Madras and Vellore..

James was a founder of the Cochin Dental Society in 1968, which later evolved into the Indian Dental Association (IDA), Kochi branch. In 1969, he became the founder president of the IDA Kerala State branch, contributing to the growth and advancement of modern dental practice in the state.

He also authored All about Dental Care, an educational book in English focusing on dental health and "Dhantha Paripalanam" in Malayalam, emphasizing the importance of dental care and promoting preventive measures.

James was also the first recipient of the "Lifetime Achievement Award" instituted by the Kerala Dental Council (KDC), which was presented by the then Kerala Minister of Health, Social Justice and Women & child development - KK Shylaja.
