= Murder of Abhimanyu M. =

Indian student activist (1997–2018)

Abhimanyu M.
- Born: 6 May 1997; Marayur or Vattavada, Idukki, Kerala, India
- Died: 2 July 2018 (aged 21); Kochi, Ernakulam, Kerala, India
- Cause of death: Assassination
- Education: Maharaja's College, Ernakulam
- Organization: Students' Federation of India

Abhimanyu M. was a student activist stabbed to death in Maharaja's College, Ernakulam on 2 July 2018. He was a student of B.Sc. Chemistry.

== Early life ==
Abhimanyu was born on 6 May 1997 as the youngest son of Manoharan and Bhoopathy, two Tamil peasants from an Adivasi community, in Vattavada. Parijith and Kowsalya are his siblings. His sister Kowsalya married Madhusudanan in a wedding attended by hundreds of students from Maharaja's College, Ernakulam. Abhimanyu was the Idukki District Committee member of the Students' Federation of India.

== Death ==
Abhimanyu was murdered by a 16-member gang involving the activists of the Campus Front of India (CFI), Social Democratic Party of India (SDPI) and the Popular Front of India (PFI). He was 21 years old at the time of his killing. According to the police reports, the murder was triggered after an argument between Students' Federation of India activists and Campus Front of India (CFI) over sticking posters within the Maharaja's College campus. The space for painting the college walls was first booked by SFI activists. This led to issues with CFI members. Abhimanyu painted graffiti on the campus walls to welcome the new batch of students and he wrote "down with communalism". This slogan provoked the Campus Front of India (CFI) members. After a verbal argument, CFI members returned to campus in the wee hours of July 2, 2018 with SDPI and PFI members and barged into the college hostel. Abhimanyu was held in position from behind and while another person stabbed him to death. 19-year-old Arjun, a student of BA Philosophy, also sustained severe injuries. He was admitted to the Ernakukulam Medical Trust Hospital and underwent emergency surgery.

SFI observed a statewide strike protesting the killing of their activist.

== Aftermath ==
- In his memory, the Abhimanyu Maharaja's Library was set up in Vattavada Grama Panchayat. Students across India contributed books over courier. Students mobilised around 10,000 books and enough funds for the construction of library.
- Simon Britto, another student leader who was paralysed after getting stabbed by the members of KSU activists at Maharaja's College on 14 October 1983. He wrote a book named "Maharaja's Abhimanyu". The book was published by handing over a copy of it to writer M. K. Sanu on 14 October 2019.
- Prominent civil society activists and writers like Sunil P Ilayidom, Balachandran Chullikkad and M K Sanu paid tributes to Abhimanyu's memory in a function organised at Maharajas college on September 19, 2018. Writer M.K Sanu drew a parallel between Abhimanyu's murder and the chopping of Professor T J Joseph's hand by religious extremists at Thodupuzha Newman College. Balachandran Chullikad remarked that he was murdered for raising voice against communalism.
- CPI(M) built a house for his family. The CPI (M) collected Rs 3.10 crore as ‘Abhimanyu martyr fund’ to help Abhimanyu's family. A student training centre in his name was also initiated in Ernakulam.
- The college magazine of Sri Vivekananda Patana Kendram (SVPK) Arts and Science College, Nilambur was named as "Abhimanyu". It included a poem dedicated to him and an article on his murder. On July 31, 2018, a group of Campus Front of India (CFI) and Social Democratic Party of India (SDPI) activists entered the college and forcefully burned the College Magazine. Later Edakkara police filed FIR against seven SFI and SDPI activists.
- Kerala Students Union (KSU) opposed the building of Abhimanyu Memorial inside Maharajas College. However, the memorial was built by Students Federation of India activists and was unveiled on July 2, 2019. This stirred controversy. Kochi Corporation ordered a probe to enquire whether the college had taken permission from the civic body before building the memorial.

== Arrests ==
The Special Investigation Team of Kerala Police charge sheeted 16 persons at the Judicial First Class Magistrate Court-II in Ernakulam on September 24, 2018. The case was registered under Sections 142, 148, 323, 324, 307 and 302 read with 149 of the IPC at the Central police station, Ernakulam. Though 30 people are accused in the murder the chargesheet was filed only against those who directly participated in the crime. The following were named in the charge sheet: JI Muhammed (CFI state secretary), Arif Bin Salim (CFI district president), Mohammed Rifa, Jeffrey, Fazaluddin, Anas, Rajeeb, Abdul Rashid Saneesh, Adil Bin Salim, Bilal, Riyaz Hussain, Saneesh, Sharukh Amani, Abdul Nasser and Anup. After the murder police arrested around 20 people in the immediate days. However, the main accused Sahal Hamsa went into hiding for more than 2 years. Sahal who was staying at a hideout in Karnataka surrendered on 18 June 2020. According to Kerala Police, Sahal was alleged to have stabbed Abhimanyu and Mohammed Shahim was the man who stabbed Arjun. Muhammad Shaheem, the second accused was also absconding, but surrendered in court in November 2019. Shajahan was the one who planned the attack and Shiraz gave all necessary training to CFI workers. Rifa, a state level leader of CFI was arrested when hiding in Bangalore. Manaf, one of the accused in a case related to chopping the hands of Professor T J Joseph in 2010, was the 13th accused in the murder case. Police found that the culprits arrived at college hostel armed with lethal weapons to attack maximum student activists. The trial of the Abhimanyu murder case is ongoing in the Ernakulam Principal Sessions Court.

== In popular culture ==
In 2019, two Malayalam films based on the incident were released. Naan Petta Makan directed by Saji S Palamel and Padmavyuhathile Abhimanyu directed by Vineesh Aaradya.
