= 1957 in Kerala =

- Centuries
- Decades: 1950s; 1960s; 1970s
- See also: List of years in Kerala; History of Kerala

Events in the year 1957 in Kerala.

Governor of Kerala -

- Burgula Ramakrishna Rao

Chief minister of Kerala –

- E. M. S. Namboodiripad

Chief Justice of Kerala High Court

- Justice K.T. Koshy

== Events ==
- 1 January - Malabar District is trifurcated into Palghat, Calicut and Cannannore districts.
- 28 Feb - 11 Mar - 1957 Kerala Legislative Assembly election.
- 5 April - E. M. S. Namboodiripad takes oath as first Chief Minister of Kerala after Communist Party of India winning 60 out of 1226 assembly seats and getting the support of five independents. He became the first Communist leader to win power through ballot.
- 30 May - T. V. Thomas and K. R. Gouri Amma two ministers of state married each other at Thiruvananthapuram.
- 17 August - Alleppey district formed from taluks under Quilon, Kottayam districts as the eight district of the state.

=== Dates unknown ===
- July - Joseph Mundassery introduced Kerala Education Bill 1957
- December - K. R. Gouri Amma introduced Kerala Agrarian Bill 1957.

== Births ==
- 10 March - Thanu Padmanabhan, theoretical physicst
- 20 October - Dennis Joseph, writer.

== Deaths ==
- 1 October - A. J. John, former Chief Minister (b.1893)

== See also ==
- History of Kerala
- 1957 in India
