= 1956 in Kerala =

- Centuries
- Decades: 1950s; 1960s; 1970s
- See also: List of years in Kerala; History of Kerala

Events in the year 1956 in Kerala.

The modern day state of Kerala was formed through States Reorganisation Act, 1956 in this year by merging most of Travancore–Cochin, entirety of Malabar District and Kasaragod taluk of South Canara from Madras State.

== Incumbents ==
=== Before formation of Kerala ===
Rajpramukh of Travancore – Cochin

- Chithira Thirunal Balarama Varma (till Oct 31)

Chief Minister of Travancore-Cochin

- Panampilly Govinda Menon (till March 23)
- President Rule

Chief Minister of Madras (Malabar district)

- K. Kamaraj

=== After formation of Kerala ===
Governor of Kerala -

- P.S. Rao (acting from Nov 1 - 21)
- Burgula Ramakrishna Rao (from Nov 22)

Justice K.T. Koshy acted as the last Chief Justice of The High Court of Thiru-Kochi and the first justice of Kerala High Court.

No elected Chief minister till 1957 Kerala Legislative Assembly election.

== Events ==
- 23 March - Panampilly Govinda Menon resigns as Chief minister of Travancore–Cochin following resignation of six members. President's rule comes into effect.
- 15 October – Chithira Thirunal Balarama Varma inaugurates Kerala Sahithya Academy.
- 17 October - Inaugural run of meter gauge train between Ernakulam and Kottayam.
- 1 November - The state of Kerala formed.
- 4 November - All India Radio commissions 630kHz transmitter at Trichur.
- 5 November - Kerala High Court established at Ram Mohan Palace, Kochi.

=== Dates unknown ===
- April - Fourth party Congress of Communist Party of India held at Palghat.
- Guruvayur Devaswom Board formed.

== Birth ==
- 16 Mar - Indrans, actor.
- 25 May - Ramesh Chennithala, politician.

== See also ==
- History of Kerala
- 1956 in India
