= 2008 in Kerala =

- Centuries
- Decades: 1980s; 1990s; 2000s; 2010s; 2020s
- See also: List of years in Kerala; History of Kerala

Events in the year 2008 in Kerala.

== Incumbents ==
Governor of Kerala -

- R.L. Bhatia (till July),
- R. S. Gavai (from July)

Chief minister of Kerala -

- V. S. Achuthanandan

== Events ==
- January 30 - Kerala cabinet directs Chief secretary to submit an enquiry report on the controversial 70-acre HMT Land Deal that had taken place in October 2006 between HMT and Mumbai-based HDIL. There are allegations that the land which costs 700 crore was sold at a highly discounted price of 91 crores to HDIL's subsidiary Blue Star Realtors.
- February 6 - Forceful eviction of poor families from Moolampilly for Vembanad Rail Bridge to International Container Transshipment Terminal, Kochi.
- February 26 - In an affidavit placed before Kerala High Court, Government of Kerala submits that HMT land deal is legal.
- February 28 - British Council Library, Thiruvananthapuram closes down.
- February - UDF raises corruption allegations against Elamaram Kareem and K. P. Rajendran over sale of 70 acres of land held by HMT Limited at Kalamassery to a Mumbai based realtor firm Blue Star Realtors a subsidiary of HDIL for building a Rs. 4000 crore Cyber City project during October 2006. This land is valued at Rs. 700 crores and teh deal took place for 91 crores.
- June - T. P. Chandrasekharan forms Revolutionary Marxist Party at Onchiam after getting expelled from CPI(M).
- July 17 - The government of Kerala revises the Social science textbook for 7th standard students in the state following controversy over a chapter named "Mathamillatha Jeevan" which was accused of promoting Atheism.
- July 18 - A group of Communist Party of India (Marxist) workers under the leadership of M.R. Murali leaves party to form Jankeeya Vikasana Samithi in Palakkad district.
- August 12 - Kerala Conservation of Paddy Land and Wetland Act, 2008 came into effect. This act prevents conversion of paddy land through landfilling.
- September 10 - Five youngsters were recruited and sent from Kerala to take part in Kashmir militancy by alleged affiliates of Lashkar-e-Taiba active in the state.
- October 7 - Two militants named Abdul Raheem and Muhammad Fayaz hailing from Kannur district and Malappuram district killed in an encounter in Lolab Valley.
- October 10 - Two militants named Muhammad Yassin and Faizal from Kannur and Ernakulam districts of Kerala killed in an encounter in the Kupwara district.
- November 13 - Kerala Police seized 125 Country Bomb from Panoor.
- December 4 - nine schoolchildren were killed and twelve injured in a road accident at Perumannu, when a Jeep hit the children as they were on their way home from school. One of the injured victims died a few days later, raising the death toll to 10 children
- December 17 - Kerala State Road Transport Corporation introduces Volvo Buses in the Thiruvananthapuram – Bangalore route.

== Deaths ==
- January 29 - Baby John, 90, politician and Revolutionary Socialist Party leader.
- May 15 - Henry Austin, Indian politician and diplomat, 88.

== See also ==
- History of Kerala
- 2008 in India
