= Ripper Jayanandan =

Criminal from Kerala

- Born: K. P. Jayanandan; 1968 (age 58); Thrissur, Kerala, India
- Other name: Ripper
- Conviction: Murder
- Penalty: Death by hanging
- Escaped: June 2013
- Escape end: 9 September 2013

Details
- Victims: 7
- Span of crimes: 2003–2006
- Country: India
- States: Kerala; Karnataka
- Date apprehended: 23 November 2006
- Imprisoned at: Poojappura Central Jail

K. P. Jayanandan, infamously known as Ripper Jayanandan (born 1968), is an alleged serial killer from Thrissur, who is accused of seven murders committed during a span of 35 robberies, in and around Thrissur Ernakulam border areas. For the seven murders committed by Jayanandan, including the double murder at Perinjanam in October 2004, Thrissur Principal Sessions judge sentenced him to death by hanging in June 2008 which was later overturned by the Supreme Court. He was sent to Poojapura Central Jail to await execution but escaped in June 2013. He was captured on 9 September 2013 near Thrissur.

== Background ==
Jayanandan was born in Thrissur district, Kerala.

== Major thefts and murders ==
Jayanandan's first alleged major offence was burgling the house of 45-year-old Jose in Mala Police Station limits in September 2003. During the robbery, he struck Jose, who was sleeping, with a crowbar and killed him and decamped with Rs 17,000 and a video cassette player.

His second burglary was in March 2004, in which he forced his way into a house in Mala Police Station limits itself, killing 51-year-old Nabeesa who woke up hearing the noise and came out. Upon entering the house, he killed 23-year-old Fousiya and attacked 28-year-old Noorjahan, and two children.

In a third burglary in October 2004, Jayanandan was accused of killing 64-year-old Kalapurackkal Sahadevan and his wife, 58-year-old Nirmala, in their house at Perinjanam, Thrissur district in Mathilakam Police Station limits, to steal 11.25 sovereigns of gold. Supreme Court later upheld the acquittal decision by Kerala High Court in the case.

His next attack was at a house in Kodungallur Police Station limits in Thrissur, in which he attacked Aravindaksha Panicker and his wife Omana Panicker and caused grievous injuries to both, besides robbing 18-sovereign gold ornaments.

Jayanandan's next target was an outlet of Kerala State Beverages Corporation at North Paravoor in August 2005. When the security guard Subhashakan challenged him to rob the next house and take more money and 3 Video cassette players, Jayanandan struck him on the head with an iron rod and killed him.

== Escape ==
The police suspect that the jailbreak occurred after midnight. The fugitives had cut through the cylindrical 'dead latch' of the padlocked cell's grilled door, possibly with a hacksaw blade, and scaled the relatively low wall of the block. (The wall had been fortified and topped with an electrified barbed wire fence in 2011 to house terror suspect Thadiyantavide Nazeer.) They proceeded to the prison's infirmary and stole bed sheets and clothes left out to dry on clotheslines.

The convicts hastily assembled a crude ladder from wooden poles to scale the wall. Once on top of the wall, they used a rope fashioned out of the knotted bed sheets and clothes to abseil down to the ground. The escapees had made up their cots inside the cell with vessels and pillows to make it appear as if they were sleeping. The prison's extensive surveillance camera network was down at the time of the escape, purportedly due to a power outage.

== Investigation ==
The escapade was a major embarrassment for the Kerala police, as Jayanandan was a seasoned criminal with multiple prior successful escape attempts. Despite high-security measures and advanced technologies, he managed to breach them using a very rudimentary scale.

== Capture ==
Jayanandan was arrested by the Kerala Police in Nellayi, a few kilometres from his native village in Thrissur on 9 September 2013. The police detained Jayanandan in the afternoon, while he was waiting to get his bicycle repaired at Nellayi junction.

== See also ==
- List of serial killers by country
- Ripper Chandran
