= 2004 in Kerala =

- Centuries
- Decades: 1980s; 1990s; 2000s; 2010s; 2020s
- See also: List of years in Kerala; History of Kerala

Events in the year 2004 in Kerala.

== Incumbents ==
Governors of Kerala -

- Sikander Bakht (till February),
- T. N. Chaturvedi (additional charge from February–June),
- R.L. Bhatia (from June)

Chief ministers of Kerala -

- A. K. Antony (till August),
- Oommen Chandy (from August)

== Events ==
=== January - July ===
- January 24 - Rashtriya Swayamsevak Sangh conducts an event named Pranthiya Karyakarthru Shibiram at Kollam with more than 16,000 delegates from 4,800 shakhas in the state.
- February 10 - Chief minister of Kerala A. K. Antony inaugurates the second reach of Goshree bridges between Bolghatty Island and Vallarpadam.
- May 4 - A sexagenarian named Bhavani Amma, aged 62 give birth to a baby boy at Samad IVF, Thiruvananthapuram through Embryo transfer and In vitro fertilisation.
- May 10 - 2004 Indian general election held in Kerala as part of the last phase of general elections.
- June 15 - Javed Ghulam Sheikh (a.k.a. Pranesh Pillai) a native of Nooranad, alleged as terrorist shot dead in an Encounter killing by Gujarat Police near Ahmedabad as part of Ishrat Jahan case.
- July 6 - A major firebroke out in Hindustan Insecticides Eloor's Endosulfan plant.
- July 18 - InfoPark Kochi the second IT park in Kerala got established.

=== August - December ===
- August 18 - Malappuram district is declared as India's first Computer literate district.
- August 19 - Rajani S. Anand, a 20 year old engineering student in the College of Engineering, Adoor hailing from Vellarada commits suicide by jumping from 6th floor of Commissioner for Entrance Examinations Kerala, Thiruvananthapuram following her inability to pay hostel fees of rs. 1,200 and reluctance of Indian Overseas Bank to disburse Student loan.
- August 29 - Chief minister of Kerala A. K. Antony tenders resignation due to poor performance of his party in Parliament elections.
- August 31 - Oommen Chandy becomes the Chief minister of Kerala.
- September 17 - Red tides observed in Thiruvananthapuram district of Kerala.
- September 28 - A four-member family found dead by suicide at Kaviyoor. The elder girl aged 15, was found to be raped hours before the death. There were allegations that this case has connections with Kiliroor sex scandal convict Latha Nair.
- October 28 - A young woman named Rejina levelled accusation against P. K. Kunhalikutty in connection with Ice cream parlour sex scandal of 1997.
- November 1 - Indian Union Muslim League workers unleash attack on journalists in Calicut International Airport on P. K. Kunhalikutty's return from Umrah.
- December 26 - Nearly 155 killed in Kollam, Alappuzha and Ernakulam districts due to 2004 Indian Ocean earthquake and tsunami.

== Deaths ==
- February 23 - Sikander Bakht, 85, Governor of Kerala.
- April 17 - Soundarya, 31, South Indian actress.
- May 19 - E. K. Nayanar, 85, Former Chief minister of Kerala.

== See also ==
- History of Kerala
- 2004 in India
