= 2007 in Kerala =

- Centuries
- Decades: 1980s; 1990s; 2000s; 2010s; 2020s
- See also: List of years in Kerala; History of Kerala

Events in the year 2007 in Kerala

== Incumbents ==
Governors of Kerala - R.L. Bhatia

Chief ministers of Kerala - V. S. Achuthanandan

== Events ==
- January 4 - Kerala Professional Colleges (Prohibition of Capitation Fee, Regulation of Admission, Fixation of Non-exploitative Fee and Other Measures to Ensure Equity and Excellence in Professional Education) Act, 2006 struck down by Kerala High Court.
- February 16 - Five live cartridges were recovered from the bag of Pinarayi Vijayan during CISF checking in Chennai International Airport.
- February 20 - Eighteen were killed in the Thattekkad boat disaster.
- March 21 - Kottakkal Police Station attacked by activists of National Development Front demanding release of their leaders, K Abdul Rehman and Baqafi A Sayeed who were arrested.
- April 5 - A major fire broke out at a cracker shop in Moideen Palli Road, Kozhikode killing eight and destroying 50 shops.
- May -
  - A massive Chickungunya outbreak in Central Travancore region of Kerala claims 40 lives.
  - Chief minister constituted a three-member task force comprising K. Sureshkumar IAS, Rishiraj Singh IPS and Raju Narayanaswamy IAS launches a massive encroachment eviction drive in Munnar, demolishing nearly 92 buildings and recovering land measuring 11,350 acres.
- May 28 - Jagathy Sreekumar acquitted by lower court at Kottayam in Vithura rape case.
- June 9 - Dalavapuram - Pallikkodi Bridge across Ashtamudi Lake opened. It is the longest bridge in South Kerala (506 m.) and connects Chavara Thekkumbhagam with Kollam.
- June 28 - Deshabhimani newspaper faces criticism for accepting 2 crores from controversial Lottery businessman Santiago Martin.
- June 30 - A ship named MV Maria carrying iron materials from China to Albania sinks 10 km west of Kochi in Arabian Sea.
- July 20 - Controversy erupts following sale of 81 acres of land of Merchiston Estate in Ponmudi by Xavi Mano Mathew and Southern Field Ventures to ISRO for Rs. 3.26 crores for setting up Indian Institute of Space Science and Technology. The estate was notified as Ecological Fragile Land by Government of Kerala in June 2005 with retrospective effect from the June 2000. Mathew purchased this land from Birla group during March 2005.
- August 2 - Abdul Nazer Mahdani acquitted from 1998 Coimbatore bombings arrives at Thiruvananthapuram and address public gathering at Shankumugham Beach along with state ministers Kodiyeri Balakrishnan, N. K. Premachandran and M. A. Baby.
- August 28 - A hooch tragedy in a Toddy shop near Avaneeswaram, Kollam district claims three lives.
- September 2 - Public works minister T. U. Kuruvilla resigns following allegations of him and family defrauding an NRI K.G. Abraham based in Kuwait for 6.7 crore rupees in a land deal based out of Rajakumari, Idukki district.
- September 17 - Four killed in Idukki district following rupture of Penstock pipe of Ponmudi Dam.
- November 29 - Radio Mango 91.9 starts the first private FM broadcasting in state from Kozhikode.
- December 10 - 12 - A terrorist training camp conducted by members of banned Students' Islamic Movement of India in Vagamon.
- December 30 -
  - Chelembra bank robbery
  - V. S. Achuthanandan, the Chief minister of Kerala becomes first Communist Party of India (Marxist) leader to climb Sabarimala Trek.

== Deaths ==
- February 1 - A. V. Aryan, politician
- April 1 - Laurie Baker, 90, low cost Architect
- June 3 - Pamman, writer, 87.

== See also ==
- History of Kerala
- 2007 in India
