= 1983 in Kerala =

- Centuries
- Decades: 1960s; 1970s; 1980s; 1990s; 2000s
- See also: List of years in Kerala; History of Kerala

Events in the year 1983 in Kerala.

== Incumbents ==
Governor of Kerala -

- P. Ramachandran

Chief ministers of Kerala –

- K. Karunakaran

== Events ==
- 24 March - News spreads about a Christian cross in Nilakkal followed by months long contestation between Hindu groups and Church in the site.
- 15 May - Hindu groups mounts protest against K. Karunakaran at Guruvayur Temple on Nilakkal issue.
- 15 November - The controversial cross removed from Nilakkal following government allocating a new site for church near Angamoozhy.
- The Government of Kerala introduced Mugger crocodile into Neyyar Dam to curb illegal tree felling.

== Birth ==
- 6 February - S. Sreesanth

== Deaths ==
- 28 September - C. H. Mohammed Koya, Deputy Chief Minister of Kerala (b.1927)

== See also ==
- History of Kerala
- 1983 in India
