= 1982 in Kerala =

- Centuries
- Decades: 1960s; 1970s; 1980s; 1990s; 2000s
- See also: List of years in Kerala; History of Kerala

Events in the year 1982 in Kerala.

== Incumbents ==
Governor of Kerala -

- Jothi Venkatachalam - till October
- P. Ramachandran - from October

Chief ministers of Kerala –

- K. Karunakaran

== Events ==
- 5 March - A. K. Saseendran moves resolution to remove Speaker of the Legislative Assembly A. C. Jose who exercised Casting vote eight times to save minority government.
- 17 March - Kerala placed in President's rule following Lonappan Nambadan withdrawing support to Second Karunakaran ministry.
- 1 April - Governor of Kerala inaugurates Government Medical College, Thrissur as the fifth medical college in state.
- 5 April - A meeting named Visala Hindu Sammelam in Ernakulam presided by Rajendra Singh and Chinmayananda Saraswati declare Karkidakam as Ramayana month.
- 19 May - 1982 Kerala Legislative Assembly election held and for the first time in India Electronic voter machine introduced in Paravur Assembly constituency.
- 3 September - A hooch tragedy in Vypin claims 78 lives.
- 1 November - Pathanamthitta district formed as thirteenth district of state following pact between K. Karunakaran and K.K. Nair MLA.
- 28-29 December - Clashes between Muslims and Kerala Police in Alappuzha following a Eid-Milad rally related scuffle.
- 30 December - Communal violence and riots in various parts of Thiruvananthapuram city.
- 31 December - Police firing at Mattancherry against rioters following communal clashes.

== Dates unknown ==
- P. Parameswaran establishes Hindutva think tank Bharatiya Vichara Kendram in Thiruvananthapuram.
- March - Religious violence in various parts of Kanyakumari district between Christians and Hindus such as Mandaikadu.
- Left Democratic Front and United Democratic Front stabilizes as coalition fronts.

== Birth ==
- 15 February - Meera Jasmine, actress.
- 8 August- Fahadh Faasil, actor.
- 16 October - Prithviraj Sukumaran, actor.

== Deaths ==
- 5 May - Accamma Cherian, politician (b.1909)
- 6 August - S.K. Pottekkatt, writer (b.1913)

== See also ==
- History of Kerala
- 1982 in India
