= 2005 in Kerala =

- Centuries
- Decades: 1980s; 1990s; 2000s; 2010s; 2020s
- See also: List of years in Kerala; History of Kerala

Events in the year 2005 in Kerala.

== Incumbents ==
Governors of Kerala - R. L. Bhatia

Chief ministers of Kerala - Oommen Chandy

== Events ==
=== January - June ===
- January 4 - Minister P. K. Kunhalikutty submits resignation following Ice cream parlour sex scandal case.
- February 9 - Forest Minister K. P. Viswanathan resigns following remarks of Kerala High Court on him helping Sandalwood smuggling mafia.
- February 15 - A youth named Praveen was abducted and murdered in Kottayam district by a Dy.SP rank official of Kerala Police with the help of goons.
- May 1 – Democratic Indira Congress (Karunakaran) founded at Thrissur by K. Karunakaran following split from Indian National Congress.
- May 26 - Secondary School Leaving Certificate results with grading system replaced existing ranking system in Kerala.
- June 22 – Jawahar Navodaya Vidyalaya, Wayanad established.

=== July - December ===
- July 17 - Kodiyeri Balakrishnan moved a Motion of no confidence against First Chandy ministry.
- July 20 - Kanichukulangara murders by Himalayan Chit Fund Group promoters against rival chit business company.
- July 27 - Additional Sessions Court Thalassery gave Death-sentence for the five convicts of 1999 Jayakrishnan Master murder.
- July 28 –
  - President of India A. P. J. Abdul Kalam addressed Kerala Legislative Assembly and presented a 'Vision 2010' for the state.
  - Victers TV an educational entertainment channel in Malayalam language operated by Department of General and Higher Education (Kerala) launched.
- August 1 - Underpass at Palayam, Thiruvananthapuram inaugurated by Oommen Chandy. The works of the 300 m long underpass in middle of the city was completed in record time of seven and half months.
- September 9 - Tamil Nadu State Transport Corporation bus was hijacked and set ablaze near Kalamassery by followers of Abdul Nazer Mahdani for his release from prison in connection with 1998 Coimbatore bombings.
- September 27 – Custodial death of a youth named Udayakumar in custody of Fort Station, Kerala Police, Thiruvananthapuram.
- October - Left Democratic Front sweeps the 2005 local polls held during September by winning more than 70% of Gram panchayats, 110/152 Block panchayats, 11/14 District councils, 34/52 Municipal councils and all the five Municipal corporations.

== Deaths ==
- March 30 - O. V. Vijayan, writer, 74.
- November 9 – K. R. Narayanan, former President of India.

== See also ==
- History of Kerala
- 2005 in India
