= Joshua Nicodemos =

Orthodox bishop

Joshua Mar Nicodemos
- Church: Malankara Orthodox Syrian Church
- Diocese: Nilakal Diocese
- In office: 2010 – Present

Orders
- Ordination: 12 May 2010

Personal details
- Born: 8 October 1962 (age 62); Kurampala, Pandalam

Joshua Mar Nicodemos is a Metropolitan of Nilakal Diocese of Malankara Orthodox Syrian Church.

== Early life ==
H. G. Joshua Mar Nicodemos was born on 8 October 1962. His Grace is a member of St.Thomas Orthodox Valiyapally Kurampala, Pandalam, in the diocese of Chengannoor.
