= 1979 in Kerala =

- Centuries
- Decades: 1950s; 1960s; 1970s; 1980s; 1990s
- See also: List of years in Kerala; History of Kerala

Events in the year 1979 in Kerala.

== Incumbents ==
Governor of Kerala -

- Jothi Venkatachalam

Chief ministers of Kerala –

- P. K. Vasudevan Nair - till October
- C. H. Mohammed Koya - till December followed by President's rule

== Events ==
- 16 April - P. K. Vasudevan Nair travels to Bombay to meet Vinoba Bhave and informs that Kerala will not impose Ban on Cow slaughter.
- 3 July - MV Kairali a ship owned by Kerala Shipping Corporation goes missing on its sail from Mormugao to Rostock with Iron ore.
- 2 October - Thiruvananthapuram railway division formed.
- 7 October - P. K. Vasudevan Nair submits resignation to Governor of Kerala following Indian National Congress (U) withdrawing its support to the government.
- 1 December - Koya ministry, the first Indian Union Muslim League led government in state resigns following Congress withdrawing support.

== Dates unknown ==
- Coalition fronts Left Democratic Front and United Democratic Front takes shape in state.

== Birth ==
- 17 December - Indrajith Sukumaran, actor.

== Deaths ==
- 7 July - C. Kesavan, Chief Minister of Travancore–Cochin (b.1891)

== See also ==
- History of Kerala
- 1979 in India
