= 2011 in Kerala =

- Centuries
- Decades: 1990s; 2000s; 2010s; 2020s
- See also: List of years in Kerala; History of Kerala

Events in the year 2011 in Kerala.

== Incumbents ==
Governors of Kerala - R. S. Gavai (till September), M. O. H. Farook (from September)

Chief Minister of Kerala - V. S. Achuthanandan (till May 14), Oommen Chandy (from May 18)

== Events ==
- January 14 - Sabarimala stampede kills 106.
- February 1 - Soumya murder case
- February 10 - Supreme Court of India gives a one-year jail sentence to R. Balakrishna Pillai under Prevention of Corruption Act, 1988.
- February 11 - International Container Transshipment Terminal, Kochi inaugurated by Shri Manmohan Singh, the Prime Minister of India.
- February 18 - R. Balakrishna Pillai remanded to Central Prison, Poojappura following Supreme Court of India finding him and two others guilty over Idamalayar corruption case that caused loss to Kerala State Electricity Board.
- April 13 - 2011 Kerala Legislative Assembly election held.
- May 13 - United Democratic Front wins Kerala Legislative Assembly elections with a narrow margin of 72 out of 140 seats.
- September 6 - Kerala Minerals and Metals produces Titanium Sponge and become the first company in India to produce this. India becomes seventh country in world to have such capabilities.

== Deaths ==
- October 30 - T. M. Jacob, 61, politician

== See also ==
- History of Kerala
- 2011 in India
