= 2012 in Kerala =

- Centuries
- Decades: 1990s; 2000s; 2010s; 2020s
- See also: List of years in Kerala; History of Kerala

Events in the year 2012 in Kerala.

== Incumbents ==
Governors of Kerala - M. O. H. Farook (till Jan 26), H. R. Bhardwaj (from Jan 26 as additional charge)

Chief Minister of Kerala - Oommen Chandy

== Events ==
=== January - May ===
- February 15 - Enrica Lexie case - Italian mariners kills two Indian fishermen.
- February 20 - Death of Ariyil Shukoor
- March 9 - Member of the Legislative Assembly from Neyyattinkara Assembly constituency R. Selvaraj of Communist Party of India (Marxist) submits resignation in a bid to leave the party.
- March 10 - Jagathy Sreekumar met with a serious accident in NH-17 near Tenhipalam.
- March 21 - Anoop Jacob of United Democratic Front retains the seat in Piravom Assembly constituency by-elections which took place following his father T. M. Jacob's death.
- May 4 - T. P. Chandrasekharan a former member of CPI (M) brutally hacked to death by assailants linked with CPI (M) by inflicting 51 fatal wounds.
- May 17 - Chamravattom Regulator-cum-Bridge across Bharathappuzha opened for traffic.
- May 26 - Communist Party of India (Marxist) leader M. M. Mani made a controversial speech in Thodupuzha where he proclaimed his party has a history of eliminating dissenters.

=== June - December ===
- June 15 - R. Selvaraj who resigned from Communist Party of India (Marxist) and defected to Indian National Congress wins back the Neyyattinkara Assembly constituency in the by-elections held.
- July 10 - First case of Food poison death due to Shawarma in Kerala claims life of a youth from Thiruvananthapuram.
- August 3 - Thiruvananthapuram Corporation stopped dumping of Municipal solid waste in Vilappilsala following months long protest by Vilappilsala Janakeeya Samithi.
- August 27 - Chala LPG tanker disaster
- September 12 - Three day long global investment meet Emerging Kerala 2012 held at Kochi.
- November 1 - Thunchath Ezhuthachan Malayalam University established at Tirur.
- December 12 - First edition of Kochi-Muziris Biennale commenced.

== Deaths ==
- January 24 - Sukumar Azhikode, 85, writer and social critic.
- September 24 - Thilakan, 77, actor.
- November 22 - P. Govinda Pillai, 86, politician.

== See also ==
- History of Kerala
- 2012 in India
