= 2009 in Kerala =

- Centuries
- Decades: 1980s; 1990s; 2000s; 2010s; 2020s
- See also: List of years in Kerala; History of Kerala

Events in the year 2009 in Kerala.

== Incumbents ==
Governor of Kerala - R. S. Gavai

Chief minister of Kerala - V. S. Achuthanandan

== Events ==
- January 8 - Manmohan Singh inaugurates Indian Naval Academy at Ezhimala, Kannur.
- March 16 -
- April 16 - 2009 Indian general election in Kerala held in Kerala as Phase 1 of 2009 Indian general election.
- May 17 - 2009 Beemapally police shooting
- June 4 - Central University of Kerala established at Kasaragod.
- July 10 - A minor Pipe bomb blast occurred in Collectorate Ernakulam district.
- July 12 - Communist Party of India (Marxist) expels senior leader V. S. Achuthanandan from its Politburo following stand against Pinarayi Vijayan on Lavalin Case.
- August 21 - Paul M George of The Muthoot Group murdered by assailants following a road rage incident.
- September 9 = Mathew T. Thomas, Transport minister resigns from Achuthanandan ministry following rift between JD (S) and CPI(M).
- September 22 - M. P. Veerendra Kumar led faction from Janata Dal (Secular) joins UDF by leaving LDF following tensions after denying party the Kozhikode seat and Kumar losing confidence of Pinarayi Vijayan.
- September 23 - A gang of DHRM (Dalit Human Rights Movement) workers killed a senior citizen named Sivaprasad, who went for morning walk near Ayiroor, Thiruvananthapuram.
- September 30 - Nearly 45 tourists killed in 2009 Thekkady boat disaster by drowning in the reservoir.
- November 8 - A non resident Keralite named Bhaskara Karanavar got killed in his home at Cheriyanad by Contract killers arranged by daughter in law.
- November 10 - United Democratic Front wins By-election held to three assembly seats namely Kannur, Alappuzha and Ernakulam.
- December 31 - A truck carrying Liquefied petroleum gas accident in Karunagappalli claims twelve lives.

== Deaths ==
- February 1 - Syed Muhammedali Shihab Thangal, 73, religious leader and politician.
- August 6 - Murali (Malayalam actor), 55.

== See also ==
- History of Kerala
- 2009 in India
