= Ripper Chandran =

Criminal from Kerala

- Born: Muthukutty Chandran; 15 December 1950; Karinthala, Nileswaram, Kerala, India
- Died: 6 July 1991 (aged 40); Kannur Central Jail, Kerala, India
- Cause of death: Execution by hanging
- Other name: Ripper
- Status: Executed
- Convictions: 1987; Murder; Rape; Theft
- Penalty: Death

Details
- Victims: 14
- Span of crimes: 1985–1986
- Country: India
- States: Kerala, Karnataka
- Weapon: Hammer
- Date apprehended: 26 February 1986
- Imprisoned at: Kannur Central Jail

Muthukutty Chandran, infamously known as Ripper Chandran (15 December 1950 – 6 July 1991) was an Indian serial killer from Kerala, who was hanged to death in 1991 for committing fourteen murders during robberies. He is currently the last person to be executed by hanging in Kerala. Chandran was also known as the Ripper because his style of killing resembled that of the unidentified killer, Jack the Ripper from London. Chandran chose to attack unsecured houses near highways and railway lines. His victims were killed by hammer blows to the head, after which Chandran robbed them. In some instances, after being assaulted, he also raped his female victims. Chandran committed fourteen murders from 1985 to 1986 and was captured by police on 26 February 1986 in Chikmagalur, Karnataka, afterwards being brought to Kerala. After his trial, a court sentenced him to death by hanging in 1987.

== Background ==
Born on 15 December 1950 in Karinthalam, Nileswaram, Chandran stopped his studies after the death of his father. Chandran left his native home at the age of 14 and lived in Karnataka by committing thefts. People in Karinthalam mistakenly believed that Chandran, who used to come home with a lot of money, had a business in Karnataka. In Karnataka, he met a man named Thimmmaya. He then assisted Chandran in robberies, later committing murders. It was on 10 September 1985 that Chandran switched from robberies and petty crimes to Ripper-style serial murders. Chandran's first victim was named Ramani, from Kasargod district, who lived near Chemnad. The next month, Chandran killed three members of a family in Manjeswaram by hitting them on the head with a pickaxe.

== Investigation and capture ==
Chandran was identified by police after committing 13 murders in various places like Chitari, Kuddlu, Chamundikun, Havanchi and Hariyatukka in Karnataka. Houses without men, unsecured houses, houses near the National Highway and railway tracks were the locations chosen by Chandran to do robberies. While the investigation was ongoing, Chandran committed one more murder. On 11 February 1986, the attack at Parassinikadav in Kannur district was the last crime Chandran committed. A week later, on 26 February, Chandran was arrested by the police in Chikmagalur, Karnataka.

== Execution ==
After his trial in 1987, a court sentenced Chandran to death. He was transferred to Kannur Central Jail and placed in solitary confinement. Chandran's accomplice, Thimmayya was initially sentenced to death, but was later acquitted. While in prison, Chandran sent appeals to avoid the death penalty, but to no avail. Chandran's solitary confinement lasted four years until 1991. On 6 July 1991, Chandran was hanged to death in the early morning. The police buried Chandran in a public cemetery after his brother refused to receive his body for fear of public outrage.

== In popular culture ==
In the 2020 Malayalam film Anjaam Pathira, Indrans played the character Ripper Ravi, which was loosely inspired from Ripper Chandran.

== See also ==
- Ripper Jayanandan
- List of serial killers by country
