= Loka Kerala Sabha =

World Kerala Assembly

Loka india Sabha
- Date: January 12, 2018
- Duration: 2 days
- Location: Trivandrum, India
- Organised by: Kerala government
- Website: www.lokakeralasabha.com

Loka Kerala Sabha (World Kerala Assembly) is an event hosted by the state government of Kerala to bring Malayali diaspora living around the globe under one platform. It was hosted under the department of Non-Resident Keralites. It aims at utilizing the expertise of NRKs for developing Kerala state. Loka Kerala Sabha is proposed to happen once in two years

The event held under the aegis of Department of Non-Resident Keralites Affairs and has budgetary support from Government of Kerala and is attended by elected representatives and selected Non Resident Keralites.

== Editions ==
=== First edition - 2018 ===
The first Loka Kerala Sabha happened from 12 to 13 January 2018. The delegates were invited by a committee constituted by the government that nominated representatives living outside Kerala. 351 members attended the first Loka Kerala Sabha, out of which 100 were living abroad, 42 were from other states of India, 30 experts from various fields and 6 members representing non-resident Keralite returnees and peoples' representatives. The event was inaugurated by the Chief Minister of Kerala, Pinarayi Vijayan.

=== Second edition - 2020 ===
The second edition happened from 1 to 2 January 2020 in Thiruvananthapuram.

=== Third edition - 2022 ===
The third edition was inaugurated in Thiruvananthapuram in June 2022. It was attended by 351 members (including 169 MLA's and MP's) from 65 countries and 21 states. The third edition has 8 key focus areas.

A regional conference following this meet was held at London in October 2022 and New York City in June 2023.

== Controversies ==
There were controversies surrounding attendance of Anitha Pullayil, an NRI who was allegedly involved in fake antiquities trade in the meets. The opposition which was largely supportive of all editions of meet had raised questions about excess spending by state for the meet, lack of transparency and collection of money by Sabha members abroad for regional conferences held in London and Newyork.

== See also ==
- World Tamil Conference
- Malayali diaspora
