= Lisie Hospital, Kochi =

Lisie Hospital
- Location within Kerala Location within India Location within Kochi

Geography
- Location: Kaloor, Ernakulam, Kerala, India
- Coordinates: 9.9884°N 76.2880°E

Organisation
- Care system: Tertiary
- Type: Referral hospital

Services
- Emergency department: Yes

History
- Founded: 1956; 70 years ago

Links
- Website: www.lisiehospital.org
- Lists: Hospitals in India

The Lisie Hospital is a hospital near Kaloor, in Kochi, India. The Lisie Hospital, located near Kaloor in Kochi, India, was founded by Mar Joseph Parecattil in 1956. The hospital was named in honor of St. Thérèse of Lisieux, whose patronage it was entrusted to, from which the name 'Lisie' is derived. It is managed by the Archdiocese of Ernakulam-Angamaly. Lisie Hospital is a tertiary referral hospital and one of the largest in kerala . The Lisie Heart Institute is a major interventional Cardiology and Cardiothoracic centre. It performed nearly 4000 interventional cardiac procedures and cardiac surgeries in 2006. Their team of doctors was reconstituted in 2008 with the joining of Jose Chacko Periappuram as the Head of Cardiac Surgery and Jacob Abraham as the head of Cardiac Anaesthesia. The present team was instrumental in performing the first total arterial bypass surgery on a beating heart and heart transplantation under Dr. Jose Chacko in the state of Kerala.

== Facilities ==
The hospital has departments including Anaesthesia, Cardiac Anaesthesiology, Cardio Thoracic Surgery, Cardiology, Endovascular and interventional radiology,Pulmonary Medicine, Critical Care Medicine, Dentistry, Dermatology, Diabetology, Emergency Medicine, ENT, Gastroenterology, Nephrology, Neurology, Neurosurgery, Obstetrics & Gynaecology, Orthopaedics, Urology, Radiology, Medical Social Work, Oncology, Pain & Palliative, Pathology, Gastrointestinal Surgery and Ophthalmology. Department of Cardiac Anaesthesiology is one of the largest Cardio thoracic practices in South India. The general medicine department handles 50,000 outpatients and 5,000 inpatients every year. In 1959, in the main block, the dental department was started with MK James as the chief dental surgeon.

== Lisie Medical and Educational institutions ==
Educational institutions within the hospital include:

- Lisie College Of Nursing
- Lisie School Of Nursing
- Lisie College Of Pharmacy
- Lisie College Of Allied Health Sciences.

=== Lisie Heart Institute ===
The Lisie Heart Institute is a tertiary care Interventional Cardiology and Cardiac Surgery Unit at the Mar Augustine Memorial Lisie Hospital. The Heart Institute is one of the leading centres for Interventional cardiology and Cardiac surgery in the state of Kerala. It was set up in 2002 and has since then performed more than 14,000 interventional procedures and 3800 Cardiac surgeries until 2007.
