= Miss Kerala 2019 =

Beauty pageant event

- Venue: Le Méridien Kochi, Ernakulam
- Entrants: 22
- Placements: 10
- Winner: Ansi Kabeer
- Congeniality: Ansi Kabeer
- Photogenic: Anjana Shajan

Miss Kerala 2019 was the 20th edition of the Miss Kerala beauty pageant. It was held at Le Méridien, Kochi on 12 December 2019. At the end of the event, Miss Kerala 2018, Pratibha Sai along with actor Shane Nigam crowned Ansi Kabeer as the winner.

On Monday, November 1, 2021, Ansi Kabeer, the winner of the Miss Kerala 2019 pageant, and the first runner-up, Anjana Shajan, tragically died in a car accident near Vyttila, Kochi, Kerala. Their car had flipped over while swerving to avoid hitting a two-wheeler.

== Format ==
This year's Miss Kerala had three phases of digital auditioning, which included social media platforms. The use of social media platforms allowed more people from all around the state to participate in the pageant. The "digital audition" was the first stage of the audition, in which contestants were given a task to complete and then submit it to their social media profiles with the pageant's logo. A judging panel assessed these tasks based on presentation, language competency, confidence, inventiveness, intelligence, and exterior grooming such as hair, makeup, and styling. At the end of each step, contestants were eliminated, and at the end of the first phase, a total of 100 contestants were shortlisted for the third phase. After the last round of auditions, 22 contestants from the Miss Kerala Top 100 were chosen as finalists.

== Results ==
| Final Results | Candidate |
|---|---|
| Miss Kerala 2019 | Ansi Kabeer |
| 1st Runner-up | Anjana Shajan |
| 2nd Runner-up | Anjana Venu |
| Top 5 | Aleesa Davis; Navya Davy |
| Top 10 | Aiswarya Sreeniwasan; Drishya Damodaran Nair; Malavika Hareendranathen; Nyma Gijo Puthenpurackal |

== Sub Title Awards ==
| Award | Contestant |
|---|---|
| Miss Beautiful Eyes | Agrata Sujith |
| Miss Beautiful Hair | Navya Davy |
| Miss Beautiful Skin | Chithra Shaji |
| Miss Beautiful Smile | Anjana Shajan |
| Miss Congeniality | Ansi Kabeer |
| Miss Fitness | Greeshma C S |
| Miss Social Media | Chithra Shaji |
| Miss Talent | Malavika Hareendranathan |
| Miss Voice | Anjali B |

== Judges ==
- Haripriya Namboodiri — Kathakali (a major form of classical Indian dance) artist
- Nikhil Prasad — Founder of Karikku (Malayalam web-series)
- Paris Laxmi — Dancer and actress
- Prasanth Nair IAS — Kozhikode district collector
- Rajeev Nair — Writer, lyricist and producer in the Malayalam film industry
- Rohini Dinakar — Costume designer
- Sajna Najam — Choreographer
- Sapana Chawla

== Contestants ==
The following are the 22 shortlisted delegates of Miss Kerala 2019:

Color key

- Declared as Winner
- Ended as Runner-up
- Ended as one of the Finalists or Semi-finalists

| No: | Delegate | Age | Hometown | Placement |
|---|---|---|---|---|
| 1 | Agrata Sujith | 21 | Kannur | |
| 2 | Aiswarya Sreeniwasan | 20 | Kannur | Top 10 |
| 3 | Aleesa Davis | 20 | Ernakulam | Top 5 |
| 4 | Amrutha K B Nair | 25 | Thrissur | |
| 5 | Anjali B | 22 | Ernakulam | |
| 6 | Anjana Shajan | 24 | Thrissur | 1st runner-up |
| 7 | Anjana Venu | 22 | Kannur | 2nd runner-up |
| 8 | Ansi Kabeer | 23 | Trivandrum | Miss Kerala 2019 |
| 9 | Aparana Sathianathan | 24 | Ernakulam | |
| 10 | Archana Tommy | 23 | Kottayam | |
| 11 | Chithra Shaji | 22 | Calicut | |
| 12 | Drishya Damodaran Nair | 22 | Thane | Top 10 |
| 13 | Gayathri S Bhat | 20 | Trivandrum | |
| 14 | Greeshma C S | 24 | Thrissur | |
| 15 | Kalyani Nair | 21 | Trivandrum | |
| 16 | Liya Elsa Abraham | 20 | Ernakulam | |
| 17 | Malavika Hareendranathan | 23 | Kannur | Top 10 |
| 18 | Meenakshy Kishore | 22 | Palakkad | |
| 19 | Mridula T M | 22 | Thrissur | |
| 20 | Navya Davy | 24 | Thrissur | Top 5 |
| 21 | Nyma Gijo Puthenpurackal | 22 | Kottayam | Top 10 |
| 22 | Shreelakshmi C | 20 | Palakkad | |

== Tragic Deaths of Miss Kerala 2019 and Runner-Up in Car Crash ==
On the early morning of Monday, November 1, 2021, a tragic car accident claimed the lives of Ansi Kabeer, Miss Kerala 2019, and Anjana Shajan, the first runner-up. The fatal crash occurred on the Vyttila-Palarivattom Bypass in Kochi. The vehicle they were traveling in lost control while attempting to evade a two-wheeler and subsequently collided with a tree, resulting in instant death for both occupants.

The incident took place near the Holiday Inn hotel in Chakkaraparambu. Two other passengers in the car sustained critical injuries and were rushed to the Ernakulam Medical Center (EMC) in Palarivattom for immediate medical attention. The occupants of the two-wheeler involved in the accident suffered only minor injuries.
