= Nilakal Orthodox Diocese =

Diocese of the Malankara Orthodox Syrian Church in India

Diocese of Nilakal

Orthodox
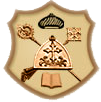
- Catholicate Emblem

Location
- Country: India
- Territory: Nilackal and Ranni regions
- Metropolitan: H. G. Joshua Mar Nicodimos
- Headquarters: Nilackal Orthodox diocesan Centre, St.Thomas Aramana, Pazhavangadi P.O, Ranni, Pathanamthitta- 689 673

Information
- First holder: Joshua Mar Nicodimos
- Rite: Malankara Rite
- Established: 15 August 2010
- Diocese: Nilakal Diocese
- Parent church: Malankara Orthodox Syrian Church

Website
- Nilakal Diocese

Nilakal Diocese is one of the 32 dioceses of the Malankara Orthodox Syrian Church. The diocese was created on 15 August 2010. Now, H.G. Dr.Joshua Mar Nichodemos is the Metropoliton of the diocese. The head office is located in Nilackal Orthodox diocesan Centre, St.Thomas Aramana, Pazhavangadi, Ranni, Pathanamthitta

== History ==
Nilakal Diocese was created on 15 August 2010. It was under by the order of Baselios Marthoma Didymos I, the Catholicos of the East and Malankara Metropolitan. H.G. Joshua Mar Nichodemos is the first Metropoliton of this diocese. The diocese was formed with 39 parishes. The name of diocese came from the place Christian community in the place Nilackal, founded by Saint Thomas in first century AD.

== Now ==
Now, H.G. Joshua Mar Nichodemos is the Metropoliton of the diocese. The head office is located in Nilackal Orthodox diocesan Centre, St.Thomas Aramana, Pazhavangadi, Ranni, Pathanamthitta. The diocese comprises the parts of Pathanamthitta and Kottayam districts. The diocese consists of 39 Parishes with 13 to 200 families. There are 2953 families in diocese. The diocese purchased a building in Ranni and made it the headquarters. The diocese made various charitable activities like supporting the poor and the needy of the diocese as well as the society.

== Diocesan Metropolitans ==
Nilakal Orthodox Diocesan Metropolitan
From	Until	Metropolitan	Notes
2010	Incumbent	Joshua Mar Nicodimos	1st Metropolitan of the diocese

== Ecclesiastical districts ==
The diocese consists five ecclesiastical districts.

- Ayroor
- Vayalathala
- Ranni
- Nilackal
- Kanakappalam

== Spiritual Organisations ==
There are many spiritual organisations working actively in this diocese, these are some of them.

- OSSAE
- OCYM
- MOMS
- MGOCSM
- Ecology Commission
- Sushrushaka Sangam
- Lehari Virudha Sangam
- Dasamsadayaka Sangam
- INAMS

== Projects under consideration ==
Construction of a Convention Centre at Catholicate Centre Ranni, Completion of the Catholicate Centre at Angamoozhi, beginning of St.Gregorios Mission Centre at Vellayil, Ayroor and starting of an Education Institution are some of the major projects under consideration.

== Parishes ==
- Angamoozhi St.George Orthodox Church
- Ayroor Kurishumutom St.Stephens Orthodox Church
- Ayroor Thadeethra Mar Behanan Orthodox Church
- Ayroor Salem St.Johns Orthodox Church
- Ayroor St.Marys Orthodox Cheriyapali
- Ayroor South Mar Behanan Orthodox Pazayapali
- Ayroor Madhaphara St.Thomas Orthodox Valiyapali
- Chempanmukhom St.Johns Orthodox Church
- Chethomkara Salem St.Thomas Orthodox Church
- Chittar St.George Orthodox Valiyapali
- Edappavoor Mar Gregorios Orthodox Church
- Karikulam St.Marys Orthodox Church
- Karimbinamkuzhy Salem St.Marys Orthodox Church
- Kattoor St.Marys Orthodox Valiyapali
- Kanakapalam St.George Orthodox Valiyapali
- Kanakapalam St.George Catholicate Center
- Kurumbanmuzhi St.Gregorios Orthodox Church
- Keekozhoor St.Peters and St.Pauls Orthodox Church
- Kottanadu St.George Orthodox Church
- Kuttiyani St.George Orthodox Church
- Mukkalumon St.George Orthodox Church
- Nilackal St.Thomas Orthodox Church
- Naranamoozhy St.George Orthodox Church
- Padimon St.Gregorios Orthodox Church
- Perumpetty St.Marys Orthodox Church
- Perunad Bethany St.Thomas Orthodox Church
- Poovanmala St.George Orthodox Church
- Punchavayal St.Marys Orthodox Church
- Ranni St.Gregorios Orthodox Church
- Seethathodu Mar Gregorios Orthodox Church
- Thalayanathodam St.Marys Orthodox Church
- Thirumuttom St.Marys Orthodox Church
- Thotammon St.Thomas Orthodox Cathedral
- Thonikadavu Mar Gregorios Orthodox Church
- Vadaserikara Marthamariam Orthodox Theerthadana Pali
- Vayalathala Mar Cleemis Bethseen Orthodox Church
- Vayalathala St.Marys Orthodox Church
- Vayalathala Mar Severios Seleeba Orthodox Valiyapali
- Vechoochira Mar Gregorios Orthodox Church
- Vayyattupuzha St.Thomas Orthodox Church
