= Tantri case =

2006 scandal in Kerala, India

Tantri case also known as "Sabarimala tantri attack case" is a controversy surrounding one of the Tantric priests of Sabarimala, Kantararu Mohanaru. The Tantri was invited to a flat owned by Sobha John, a sex racketeer in Kochi on 23 July 2006 on the pretext of performing rituals at home. He was then threatened at gun point to pose with naked women and blackmailed to part with gold. Eleven persons including Sobha John were held guilty in the Sabarimala tantri blackmailing case by the Ernakulam Sessions court in August 2012. The Tantri was acquitted of all charges of immoral trafficking.

John was released on bail in 2016.
