= Kottayam Pushpanath =

Indian author

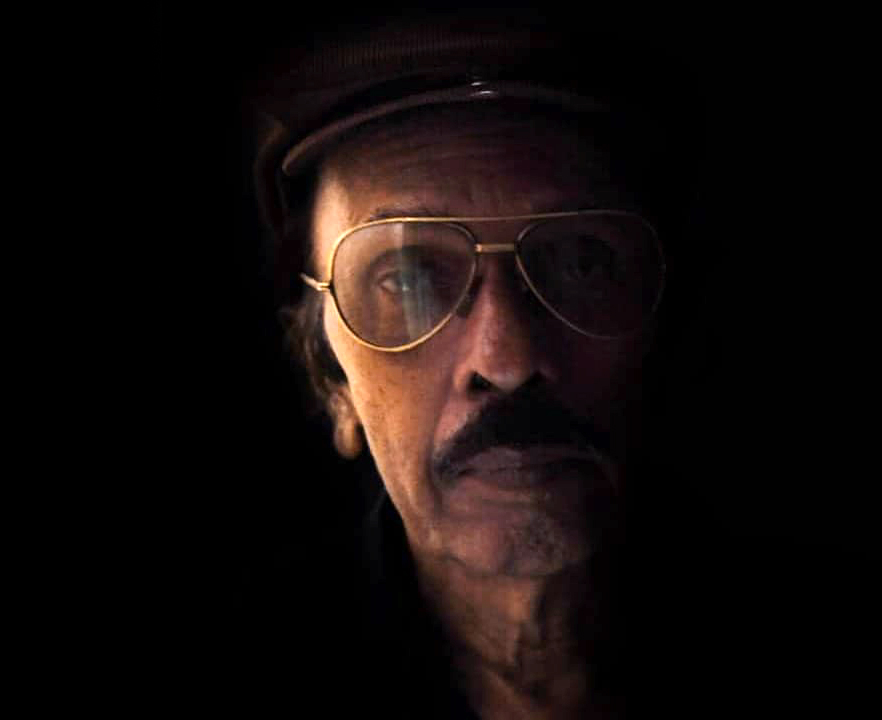
- Born: Pushpanath nadar 1937
- Died: 2018 (aged 80–81); Kottayam, India
- Resting place: CSI Cathedral Cemetery, Kottayam, India
- Occupations: Teacher, Novelist
- Spouse: Mariayamma Pushpanath
- Relatives: Rayan Pushpanath (Grandson)
- Writing career
- Language: Malayalam, Tamil, Hindi, Bengali, Gujarati, Kannada, Telugu
- Notable works: Chuvanna Manushyan; Draculayude Makal; Thaimoorinte Thalayodu; Chuvanna Angi; Pharavonte Maranamuri; Bhramarakshass; Dial 00003; Parallel Road
- Website: kottayampushpanath.com

Kottayam Pushpanath was an Indian author known for his contributions to detective fiction writing in Malayalam. He has been called the "father of Malayalam fiction" and the "Arthur Conan Doyle of India". While incorporating ideologies and supernatural elements creatively in horror story writing, he primarily focused on plausible crime stories that motivated readers to become detectives themselves and solve the mysteries.

In 1968, he released his first novel, Chuvanna Manushyan, a scientific thriller, and went on to write over 350 works, including mainstream novels, science fiction, and horror fiction, during the 1970s and 1980s.

== Early life ==
Kottayam Pushpanath was born Pushpanath Nadar in Kottayam district in Kerala, on May 14, 1937, to Sathyanesan and Rachel. He completed his primary and secondary education from Good Shepherd School and MT Seminary School in Kottayam and he graduated in History from the University of Kerala. After finishing TTC from Cambridge Nicholson Institute (CNI) Kottayam, he started his career as a teacher at Kodiyathoor School in Kozhikode. Later he served as a teacher of History in different Government schools in Kallarkutty, Devikulam, Karapuzha, Nattakom and Kottayam Medical College school.

== Literary career ==
As a student at the MT Seminary school, Pushpanath wrote a short story "Thiramala” (Waves) for the school magazine, announcing his entry into the world of writing. He released his first novel named Chuvanna Manushyan in 1968 which was a scientific thriller. Later on, he penned down more than 300 works including science fiction, horror fiction, fantasy, non-fiction and many short stories during the period of 1970s and 80s. Many of his works have been translated into different Indian languages such as Tamil, Kannada, Telugu, Hindi, Gujarati and Bengali. His novel Souparnika was serialised in Tamil. Kottayam Pushpanath has also translated Bram Stoker’s world-renowned Gothic horror novel Dracula and Arthur Conan Doyle’s The Hound of the Baskervilles into Malayalam. Two of his novels – Brahmarakshass and Chuvanna Anki– were made into movies in Malayalam.

Pushpanath followed the tradition of Sherlock Holmes and Hercule Poirot in creating two fictional detectives, Detective Marxin and Pushparaj. Detective Pushparaj would be the protagonist if the novels are set in India and Detective Marxin would take the lead role in novels set outside India. Some novels featured another fictional character, Detective Sudheer, as the lead.

Kottayam Pushpanath established his publications in 1977, the Kottayam Pushpanath Publications, through which most of his works came out. All his books are being re-published by Rayan Pushpanath through Kottayam Pushpanath Publications now. Many of Pushpanath's books are published on mainstream digital platforms as e-books and audiobooks. Kottayam Pushpanath Foundation was set up by the Kottayam Pushpanath family after the author's death, funded with the family’s assets and run by family members and foundation members for solely charitable purposes.

== Death ==
Kottayam Pushpanath died on 2 May 2018 aged 80 at his home in Kottayam after a long bout of age-related problems.

== Selected works ==
- Chuvanna Manushyan (The Red Man)
- Hitlerude Thalayodu (Skull of Hitler)
- Maranamillathavan (The Immortal)
- Olimbassile Raktharakshass (Vampire in Olympus)
- Plutoyude Kottaram (Castle of Pluto)
- Thaimoorinte Thalayodu (Skull of Taimur)
- Aalmarattam
- King Cobra
- Diamond Girl
- Kazhukan
- Chuvanna Anki
- Bhrammarakshass
- Pharahonte Maranamuri (The Death Room of Pharaoh)
- Draculayude Makal (The Daughter of Dracula)
- Lucifer
- Dracula (Malayalam translation of Dracula)
- Dracula Unarunnu (Rise of Dracula)
- Draculayude Nizhal (Shadow of Dracula)
- Dracula Asiayil (Dracula in Asia)
- Dracula Kotta (Castle of Dracula)
- Draculakottayile Sundharikal
- Draculayude Raktham (Blood of Dracula)
- Draculayude Anki (Dracula's Coat)
- Operation Space Rocket
- Thurangathile Sundhari (The Beauty in the Tunnel)
- Devil
- "The Devils"
- Rajarajeswari
- Overbridge
- Devil's Corner
- Oru Narthakiyude Maranam (The Death of a Lady Dancer)
- Parallel Road
- Dial 00003
- Devil's Corner
- Dinosaurs
- Level Cross
- Timur’s Skull
- The Murder
- The Blade
- Napoleonte Pratima (The Napoleon's Statue)
- Simham (The Lion)
- Murder Gang
- Red Robe
- Nizhalillatha Manushyan (The Man without Shadow)
- London Kottarathile Rahasyangal (The Secrets of London Palace)
- Monalisayude Ghathakan (The Murderer of Monalisa)
- Cardinalinte Maranam (The Death of Cardinal)
- Pandavan Mala
- Rahasyam
- Thandavam
- Aaru Viral
- Chuvanna Neerali
- Death Rays
- Hotel Psycho
- Ladies Hostelile Bheekaran
- Murder Gang
- Luciferude Makal
- Nagachilanka
- Nagamanikyam
- Neelaraktham
- The Blade
- Yakshimana
- Durgakshethram
- Chuvanna Kaikal
- Ward 9
- Death Circle
- Triple X
- Agnimanushian
- Nalam Valavile Nagasundari
- Mandramohini
- Neelakannukal
- Devayakshi
- Gandharvayamam
- Tornado
- Rajkottile Nidhi
- Yakshikkavu
- Project 90
- The Jeep
- Garudan
- Devanarthaki
- Dead Lock
- Avan Varunnu
- Kazhukante Nizhal
- Computer Girl
- Detective Marxinum Bheekarasthvavum
- Jarasandhan
- Secret
- Yakshiyambalam
- Deadly Heart
- Pischachinte Kotta
- 666
- Bermuda Triangle
