= 2015 Kerala meteoroid =

Meteor air burst over Kerala, India

2015 Kerala meteorite
- Date: 27 February 2015
- Time: 22:00 PM IST (UTC +5.30 hours)
- Location: Valamboor and Kuruppampady, in Ernakulam, Kerala; 9.98°N 76.28°E
- Type: Fireball
- Cause: Air burst of small meteor

The 2015 Kerala fireball was a meteor air burst that occurred over Kerala state in India on 27 February 2015.

== Initial reports ==
The fireball, reportedly accompanied by a sonic boom, was noticed across the sky in parts of Thrissur, Ernakulam, Palakkad, Kozhikode and Malappuram districts of Kerala at around 22:00 PM IST(local time, UTC +5.30 hours) for about 5 to 6 seconds.

Initial reports suggested that it may have been a part of a rocket body used to launch the Yaogan Weixing-26, a Chinese satellite launched in December 2014. Later, the Meteorology Department and Disaster Management Authority of Kerala refuted the theory stating that if this was the case, it should have been spotted by the meteorology radars.

== Impact sites ==
Meteorites (meteoroid debris) hit multiple places in Ernakulam district. Small fragments which are believed to be parts of the meteoroid were recovered from Valamboor, near Kolenchery, and Kuruppampady, near Perumbavoor.

A team of scientists from the State Emergency Operations Centre (SEOC) and Geological Survey of India visited the impact sites and collected samples for analysis. A preliminary report indicated that the fragments' chemical composition consist of nickel and iron ore.

== See also ==
- Bolide
- Impact event
- Meteorite fall
