= Perinjanam =

Perinjanam Perinnanam, Peringanam
- village
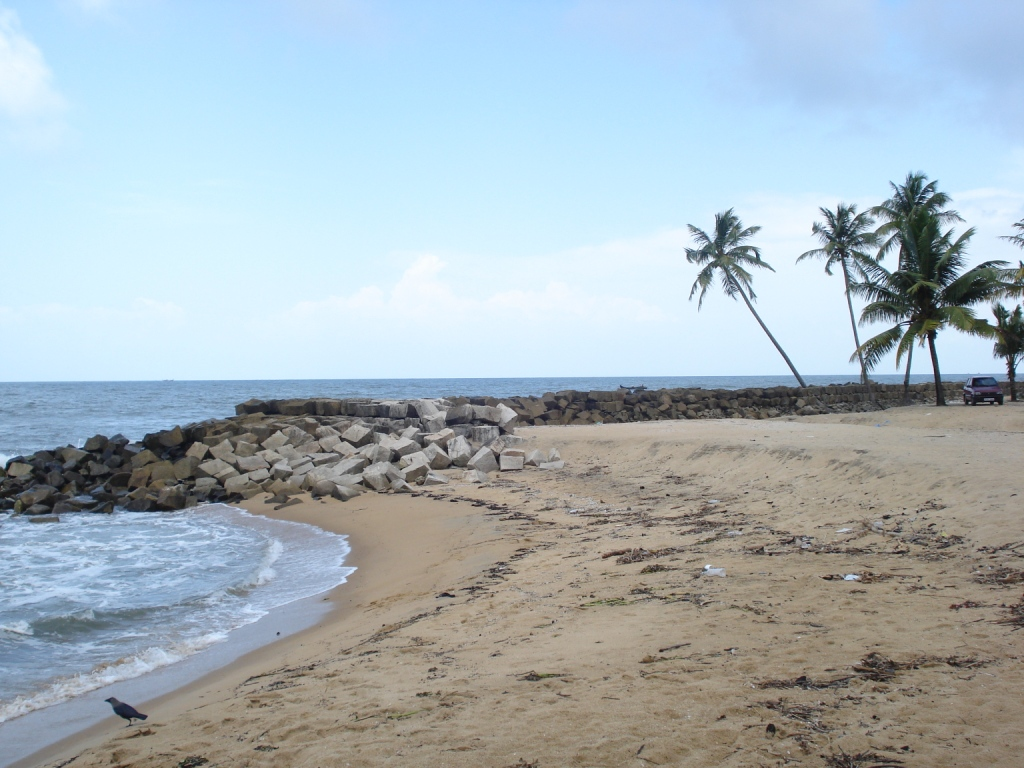
- Perinjanam beach
- Interactive map of Perinjanam
- Coordinates: 10°18′50″N 76°8′55″E
- Country: India
- State: Kerala
- District: Thrissur

Population (2011)
  - Total: 21,012

Languages
  - Official: Malayalam, English
- Time zone: UTC+5:30 (IST)
- PIN: 680686
- Telephone code: 0480
- Vehicle registration: KL-47
- Nearest city: Irinjalakuda and Kodungallur
- Lok Sabha constituency: Chalakudy
- Vidhan Sabha constituency: Kaipamangalam
- Climate: Coastal climate (Köppen)
- Website: www.perinjanam.com

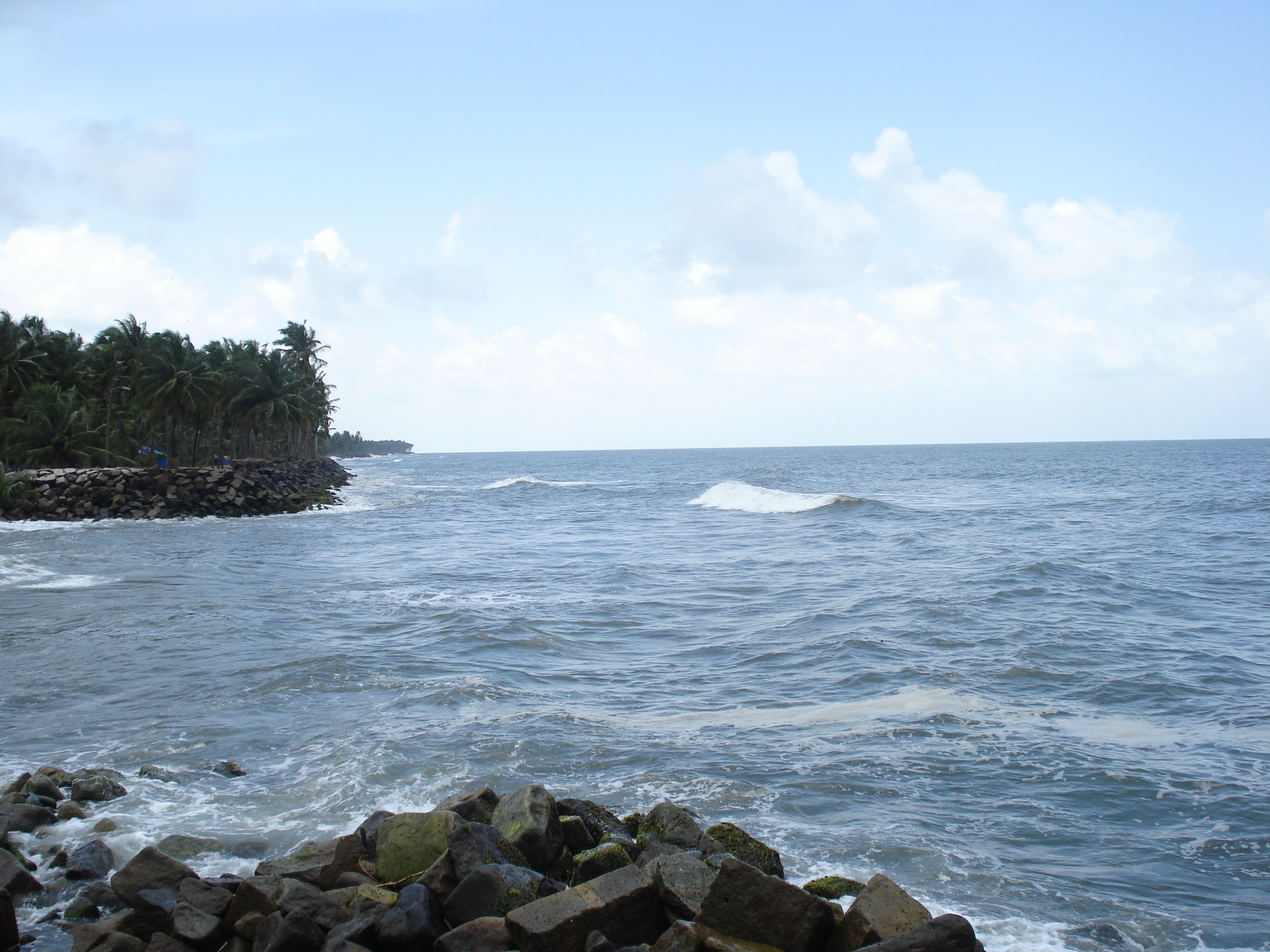
Perinjanam

Perinjanam is a village in Thrissur district in the state of Kerala, India. It is one of the smallest villages in Kerala. The coastal village is just half a kilometer wide. National Highway 66 passes through Perinjanam. The neighbouring villages are Mathilakam, Padiyoor and Kaipamangalam. It is bordered by Canoli canal in the east and Arabian Ocean in the west.

== Etymology ==
Perinjanam is just 12 km from Kodungallur and 13 km from Triprayar.

== Demographics ==
As of 2011 India census, Perinjanam had a population of 21012 with 9666 males and 11346 females.
