= Disaster management in India =

Disaster management in India — policies, laws, routines, and courses-of-action to aid in the conservation and recovery of lives and property during a natural or man-made disaster. Disaster management plans are multi-layered, and are planned to address issues such as floods, hurricanes/cyclones, fire, mass failure of utilities (blackouts) and the rapid spread of disease (pandemic).

From a meteorological standpoint, India is especially vulnerable to natural disasters due to its unique location below the Himalayas (facing the open Indian Ocean) as well as its geo-climatic conditions and varied landscapes; monsoons, subsequent landslides and floods, droughts, famine, wildfires, cyclones, and earthquakes are all experienced to varying degrees on the Subcontinent, in addition to areas of dense overpopulation being at greater risk for disease outbreak and sanitation concerns, in the event of a natural disaster.

Due to this vastness of the country, different regions are vulnerable to different natural disasters. For example, during monsoon season, it is the peninsular regions of South India that are generally most affected, as well as by cyclone or tsunami; the more temperate to arid states of western India risk severe drought, famine and/or wildfire during summer. The more remote, mountainous regions of the North, especially the Himalayan states, can experience devastating avalanches in winter, spring flooding and major landslides during wet periods. This is in addition to earthquakes which, in the mountains, bring the potential for increased devastation due to falling rocks, mudslides, and flash floods.

== Overview ==
The new approach started from the conviction that development cannot be sustained unless mitigation is built into the development process. Another cornerstone of the approach is that mitigation must be multi-disciplinary, spanning across all sectors of development. The new policy also emanates from the belief that investments in mitigation are much more cost effective than expenditure on relief and rehabilitation. Disaster management occupies an important place in India's policy framework, as poor people are most affected by disaster and they are India's predominant population.

The steps being taken by the Government emanate from the approach, has been outlined above. The approach has been translated into a National Disaster Framework (a roadmap) covering institutional mechanisms, disaster prevention strategy, early warning systems, disaster mitigation, preparedness and response and human resource development. The expected inputs, areas of intervention and agencies to be involved at the National, State and district levels have been identified and listed in the roadmap. This roadmap has been shared with all the State Governments and Union Territory Administrations. Ministries and Departments of the Government of India and the State Governments/Union Territory Administrations have been advised to develop their respective roadmaps taking the national roadmap as a broad guideline. There is, therefore, now a common strategy underpinning the action being taken by all the participating organisations/stakeholders.

== The Disaster Management Act, 2005 ==
The Disaster Management Act was passed by the Lok Sabha on 28 November 2005, and by the Rajya Sabha on 12 December 2005. It received the assent of the President of India on 9 January 2006. The Act calls for the establishment of a National Disaster Management Authority (NDMA), with the Prime Minister of India as chairperson. The NDMA has no more than nine members at a time, including a Vice-Chairperson. The tenure of the members of the NDMA is 5 years. The NDMA which was initially established on 30 May 2005 by an executive order, was constituted under Section-3(1) of the Disaster Management Act, on 27 September 2005. The NDMA is responsible for "laying down the policies, plans and guidelines for disaster management" and to ensure very timely and effective response to disaster". Under section 6 of the Act it is responsible for laying "down guidelines to be followed by the State Authorities in drawing up the country Plans".

== Disaster Management Plan ==
On 1 June 2016, Narendra Modi, the Prime Minister of India, launched the Disaster Management Plan of India, which seeks to provide a frame work and direction to government agencies for prevention, mitigation and management of disasters. This is the first plan nationally since the enactment of the Disaster Management Act of 2005.

== About the Authority ==
National Disaster Management Authority (NDMA) is an agency of the Ministry of Home Affairs whose primary purpose is to coordinate response to natural or man-made disasters and for capacity-building in disaster resiliency and crisis response. NDMA was established through the Disaster Management Act enacted by the Government of India in December 2005. The Prime Minister is the ex-officio chairperson of NDMA. The agency is responsible for framing policies, laying down guidelines and best-practices and coordinating with the State Disaster Management Authorities (SDMAs) management.
