= Campus Front of India =

Indian student organisation

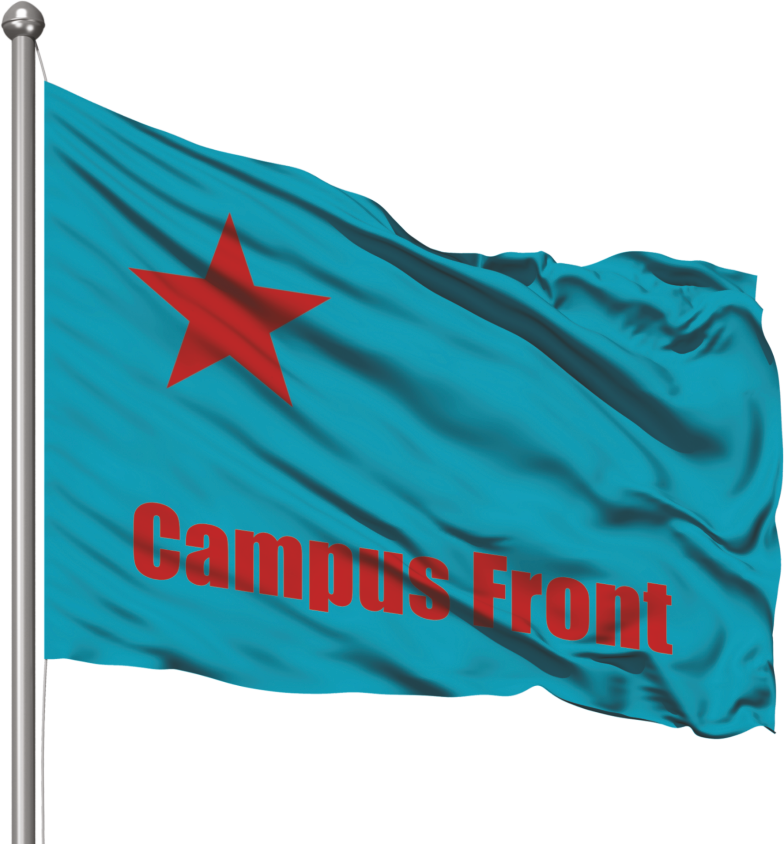
- Flag of Campus Front of India
- Formation: 7 November 2009; 16 years ago
- Type: Student Organisation
- Headquarters: No. 19, 2nd floor, RI Towers, Queens road, before Indian Express, Bangalore, Karnataka, India - 560001.
- National President: M. S. Sajid
- General Secretary: Ashwan Sadiq P
- Vice President: KH Abdul Hadi
- Vice President: Homa Kausar
- Website: campusfrontofindia.org

The Campus Front of India (CFI) is the student/campus wing of the banned Islamist organization, the Popular Front of India. CFI was launched at New Delhi on 7 November 2009 at the National Students Convention. The founder and president was Muhammad Yusuff from Tamil Nadu. The Popular Front of India, Campus Front of India and seven other associated outfits were banned by the Government of India for unlawful activities in September, 2022.

== Protests ==
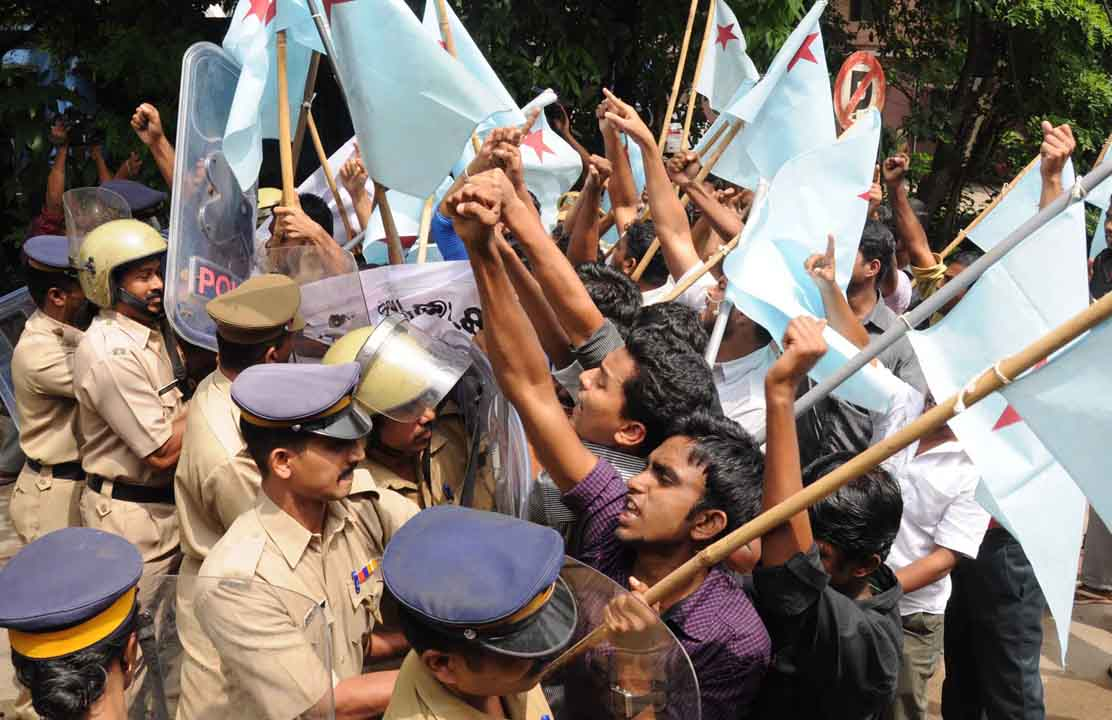
A CFI demonstration in 2011

=== Anti-CAA protests ===
The CFI actively took part in the Anti-CAA agitations across the country. Approximately thirty-eight members of Campus Front of Indians were arrested for organizing Collectors Gate Road blockade in Mangaluru on seventeenth of December 2019. The protest was held to condemn the alleged police action against the students of Jamia Millia Islamia and AMU who protested against the new Citizenship Amendment Act. On February twenty-seventh 2020, fifty members were arrested for staging a Rajbhavan march in Bengaluru while protesting against the violence that took place in Northeast Delhi.

=== Hijab protests ===
The organization held protests against the CBSE-conducted All India Pre Medical Test (AIPMT), for including the hijab and burqa in its list of restricted items in the examination halls. The AIPMT restricted head-coverings to discourage unfair practices during the examinations in 2015.

Earlier in 2022, the CFI allegedly encouraged six Muslim students at the Government PU College for Girls in Udupi to take a stand on the right to wear the hijab in the college premises.

The college previously restricted hijab as being incompatible with its uniform and dress code. The protest led to a huge row in the state of Karnataka, with rival groups of Hindu and Muslim students protesting against each other, and a writ petition in the Karnataka High Court. The lawyer representing the college characterized the CFI in the High Court as the chief instigator of the dispute and a "rank radical organization". The CFI met with the college authorities and the deputy director for pre-university education demanding that they should allow girls to wear hijab to attend classes.

=== Raising issues related to Campus/Schools ===
CFI held protests against the four year undergraduate program (FYUP), proposed at the Delhi University. On the 20th of June 2013, it organized a signature campaign in over 100 colleges of twenty universities in many parts of India.

After about two years of establishment of the lock-down, CFI along with other student organizations of Jamia Millia Islamia have demanded reopening of the campus at the earliest opportunity.

=== Against crime on campus ===
CFI protested against the Mangalore One School Management for inaction after a four-year-old girl was sexually assaulted by a cab driver. It extended its support to Justice for Baby Nirbhaya Forum by the United Muslim Organization and participated in Silent Candle Light at Mangalore.

On November 9, 2019, Fathima Latheef, a nineteen year old first-year undergraduate student of Indian Institute of Technology Madras died by suicide in her hostel room in Chennai, allegedly due to the humiliation and religious discrimination she was facing from faculty members. CFI staged a protest outside IIT-Madras demanding that those responsible for her death must be punished.

=== Human Rights ===
CFI Dakshina Kannada unit demanded that the Deputy Commissioner handed over the Soujanya rape and murder case to the CBI in a protest held in front of the Deputy Commissioner's office in Mangalore.

CFI on behalf of its Save Rohingya campaign organized a march to the Myanmar embassy protesting against the Myanmar government's atrocities against Rohingya people.

== Campaigns ==
=== Green Campus / Healthy Campus Campaign ===
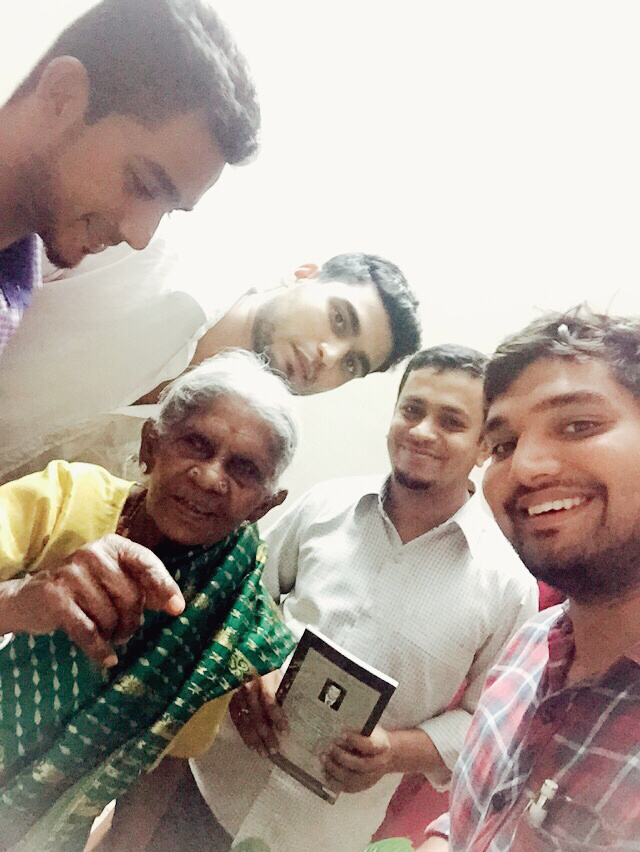
Campus Front activists with Saalumarada Thimmakka on World Environment Day, 2015

CFI's Karnataka unit conducts the Green Campus campaign in June every year, through planting trees and cleaning school campuses in Karnataka. On 5 June 2015, (World Environment Day) the organization re-launched the campaign with a new name, Healthy Campus, hoping to widen its reach. Along with planting trees and cleanliness, it raised anti-drug and anti-tobacco awareness in schools. These activities helped the organization to gain a good name through social service, dimming allegations against it.

=== Dignity Conference ===
CFI celebrated its 10th anniversary on the theme "Decade of Dignity". The conference was held on 6 November 2019 at the Talkatora Stadium in New Delhi. Kannan Gopinathan, an Ex IAS Officer, Shwetha Sanjeev Bhat, the wife of jailed Gujarat police officer, and Chinmaya Mahanand Ambedkarite addressed the gathering.

== Controversies ==
The CFI was considered to be an involved party in the murder of Abhimanyu in the Maharaja's college Ernakulam during a clash with the SFI.

The Enforcement Directorate concluded that substantive amount of funds were raised by the PFI along with affiliated organizations like the CFI to run terror camps, money laundering, and creating a riot atmosphere by promoting enmity between various religious groups.

== Award ==
According to TwoCircles online news agency, Campus Front announced an award named Ekalavya Award for Students with 'exceptional performance in higher secondary, poor backgrounds and hailing from marginalized communities'.
