= Jose Chacko Periappuram =

Indian cardiac surgeon

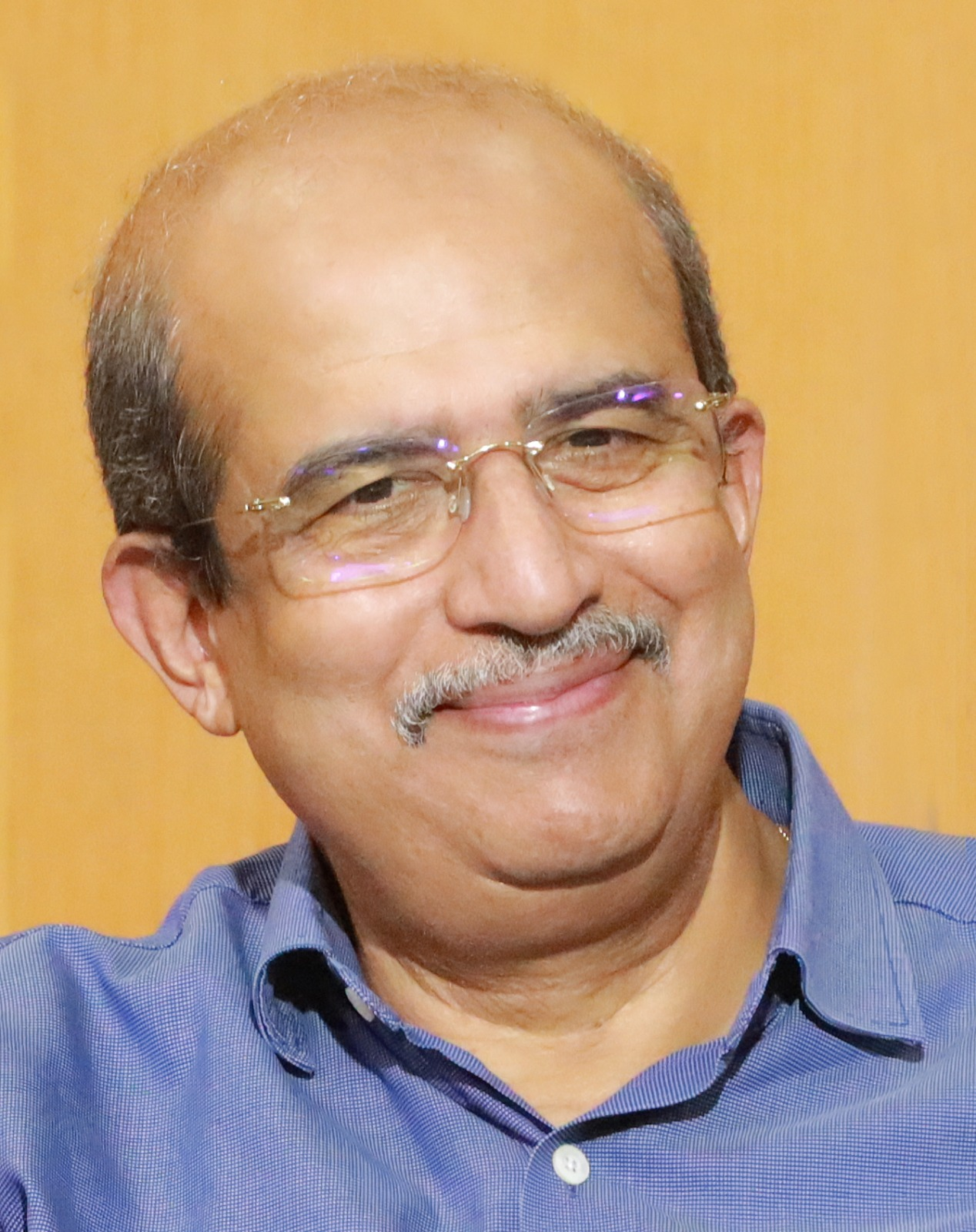
- Born: 28 April 1958 (age 68); South Paravur, Kerala, India
- Education: St. Thomas College, Pala; Government Medical College, Kottayam
- Years active: Since 1985
- Known for: First successful Heart transplant in Kerala; First successful heart retransplant in India; First successful Beating Heart Surgery in Kerala; First successful TAR (Total Arterial Revascularization); First Awake Bypass Surgery in Kerala
- Medical career
- Profession: Surgeon
- Institutions: University Hospital of Wales; Manchester Royal Infirmary
- Sub-specialties: Cardiothoracic surgery Heart transplantation

Jose Chacko Periappuram (born on April 28, 1958) is an Indian cardiac surgeon and medical writer who performed the first successful heart transplant in the state of Kerala, India, as well as the first successful heart retransplant in the country. His other achievements include the first beating heart, awake bypass and total arterial revascularization surgeries in the state. Periappuram is a fellow of the Royal College of Surgeons of Edinburgh, the Royal College of Surgeons of Glasgow and the Royal College of Surgeons of London. He is the founder and chairman of "Heart Care Foundation", a charitable trust that financially assists poor heart patients. The Government of India awarded him the Padma Bhushan, the third highest civilian award, in 2025.

== Early life ==
Jose Chacko Periappuram was born in South Paravur, a small village in Ernakulam district of the Indian state of Kerala, born to P. M. Chacko and Mary Chacko. His father was a botanist who was credited with the discovery of two plant species and also served as a principal at St. Thomas College, Pala from 1979 to 1984. Fr. Abel, the founder chairman of Kalabhavan, was his paternal uncle. After completing his matriculation studies from St. Ephrem's High School, Mannanam, he joined St. Thomas College, Palai, from where he earned a BSc with botany as the optional subject. He passed MBBS from Govt. Medical College, Kottayam in 1985 and after a year of senior house surgeon at the Kottayam Medical College, he proceeded to the United Kingdom for post-graduate education and training.

He completed his FRCS part 1 from the Royal College of Surgeons of Ireland in Dublin, in 1986 and completed his general surgical training from various hospitals in the Republic of Ireland. This included the County Hospital, Roscommon, Our Lady's Hospital, Drogheda, and the Mater Misericordiae Hospital at Dublin.

He passed his FRCS from the Royal College of Surgeons of Glasgow and Edinburgh in the year 1992. His higher cardiac surgical training was mainly at the University Hospital of Wales and Manchester Royal Infirmary and passed the FRCS in cardiac surgery in 1994, he is one of the few cardiac surgeons to secure this degree from all three surgical colleges. His mentor was I. M. Breckenridge, who was a member of the team which led the first heart surgery in England in the 1960s. He further underwent training in cardiac transplantation at the Papworth Hospital.

== Heart transplants ==
On his return to Kerala, Periappuram joined Medical Trust Hospital, Kochi, where on 13 May, 2003 a team led by Periappuram performed the first heart transplantation in the state of Kerala, thus making it the third state in India to achieve this feat. He performed a second heart transplant the following year.

On 6 March 2014, Periappuram at Lisie Hospital, Kochi became the first cardiac surgeon to conduct a successful heart re-transplant in India when a patient who had already received a transplant developed a heart valve infection a few months later.

== Other surgical achievements ==
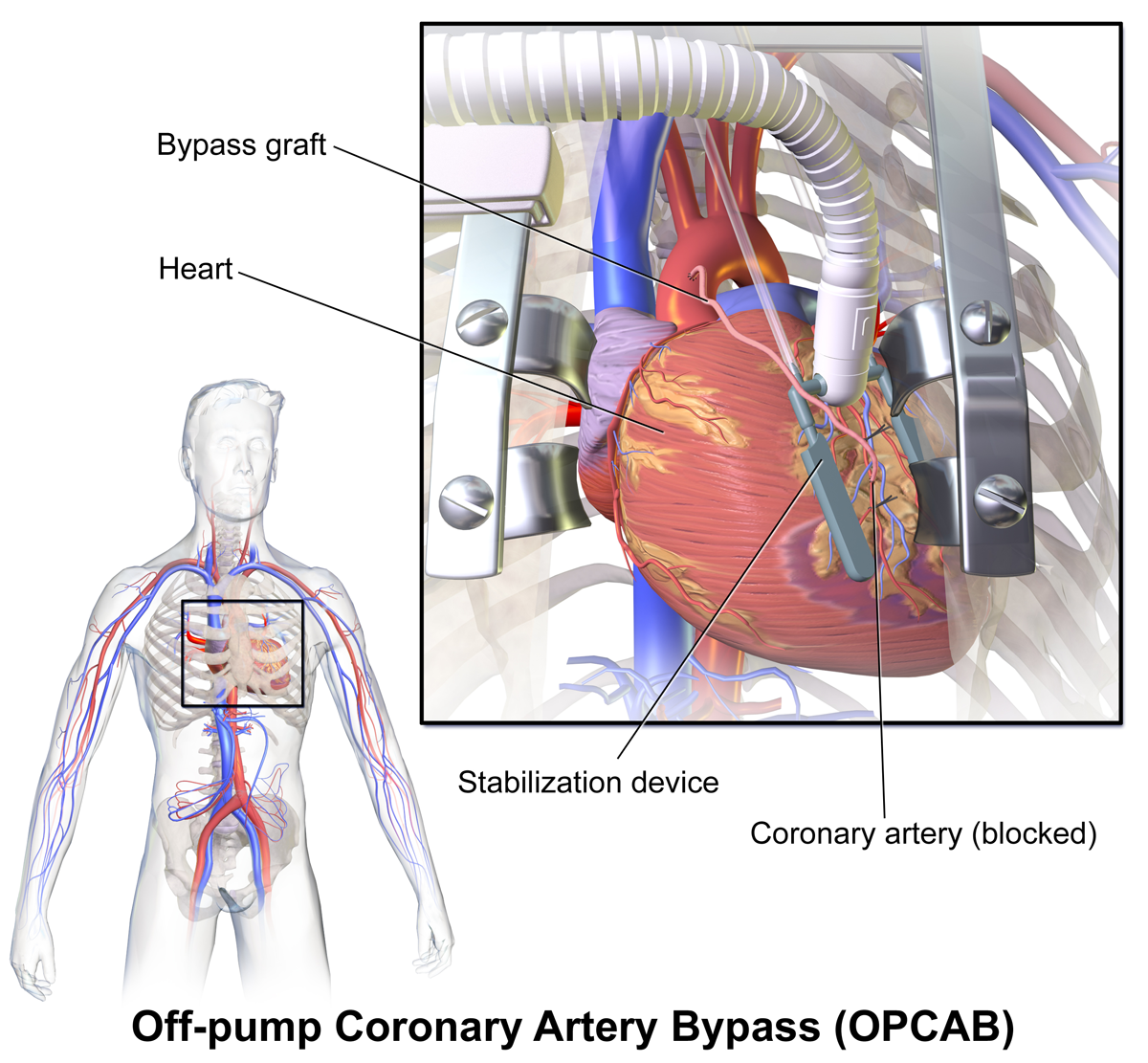
Off-pump coronary artery bypass (beating heart surgery)

He was the first heart surgeon to commence a beating heart surgical program in Kerala. He is also the first surgeon in Kerala to perform bypass surgery using arterial grafts and also TAR. Another group of patients who, due to lung diseases, could not have their surgeries done were helped by a novel technique called awake bypass surgery.

== Heart Care Foundation ==
His charitable trust called the Heart Care Foundation helps government medical colleges in Kerala enabling poor patients to have heart surgeries done, by helping them financially. They also aim to educate the common people of India about the heart diseases. The Heart Care Foundation has multiple projects in operation. They have donated organs to various Government Medical College Hospitals. They have also conducted charity runs and mini-marathons and have organized the World Heart Day countless times.

One of such projects aims to help 1000 patients undergo heart surgeries over 10 years at various Government Hospitals in Kerala. "Save a heart, save a life" is focused on educating people about the importance of Basic Life Support (BLS). Cardiopulmonary Resuscitation (CPR) will be shown and taught to small groups all around Kerala so that the life support at basic level can be affected in times of need to save lives.

They also publish a quarterly publication of the Heart Care Foundation called "Caring Hearts" which carries extensive information about heart diseases, its prevention, causes, and tips and also covers the progress of the activities of Heart Care foundation's activities on a regular basis. Their efforts have led to implementation of AED devices in the Cochin airport. Heart Care Foundation organized a musical evening 'Hridyam' in connection with the release of the educational audio video album 'Mi Corazon" aimed at educating people about organ donation, basic life support and also to inculcate charity among young minds. to spread awareness on CPR and heart disease emergencies.

== Positions held ==
- Consultant and Head of Department of Cardiothoracic Surgery Lisie Heart Institute, Kochi, Kerala, India
- Chairman, Heart Care Foundation
- Joint Secretary, Heart Failure Society of India
- President, Quality Forum Kerala
- Director, Kalabhavan Studios Ltd, Ernakulam
- Trustee, Kalabhavan Talent Residential School, Kochi
- Secretary of the Kerala Medical Association in 1981
- National Organizing Secretary of the Indian Association of Cardiovascular Conference in 2005
- An executive committee member of the Indian Cardio-Vascular Association for three years from 2005 to 2008

== Awards ==
- Mother Teresa Award, 2003
- Indira Gandhi Award, Kuwait, 2006
- Padma Shri award in 2011
- Padma Bhushan award in 2025

== Books ==
Besides the numerous medical and non-medical articles that have been published, he has presented a large number of clinical studies at the various national conferences. He has also written an educational book about heart diseases in Malayalam called 'HRIDAYAM' (The Heart). In 2021 The Malayala Monorama publications published his book called "hrudayam thottu'(ഹൃദയം തൊട്ടു) which is a collection of his experience with treating the sickest of sick patients in his career.

== Other ==
He spoke on the need for coordination between hospitals with elaborate heart care departments at a press meeting on an uncommon multiple surgery and introduced the orator. P.V. Louis for a speech on the need for accreditation of hospitals to ensure quality. He explained the need of bypass surgery in women and the need for the youth to take their health into consideration.

Several workshops on the various types of surgeries such as beating heart surgery and CPR have been conducted. He has also participated in many seminars on topics like ethics of health care in many prestigious institutions. He addressed the academic session on heart transplantation at a CME programme in Kottayam. He also presented a paper on the need of hospitals for women and children and a paper on hybrid perspective in the management of aortic aneurysm'.

Sudansu Bhattacharya performed a surgery on beating heart at the Lisie Heart Institute along with chief cardiac surgeon Jose Chacko Periappuram which was telecast live to the conference room at the Lisie Hospital, enabling over 25 cardiac surgeons from the state assembled there to discuss and clarify doubts.
