= P. Sathasivam =

21st Governor of Kerala and 40th Chief Justice of India

Palanisamy Sathasivam
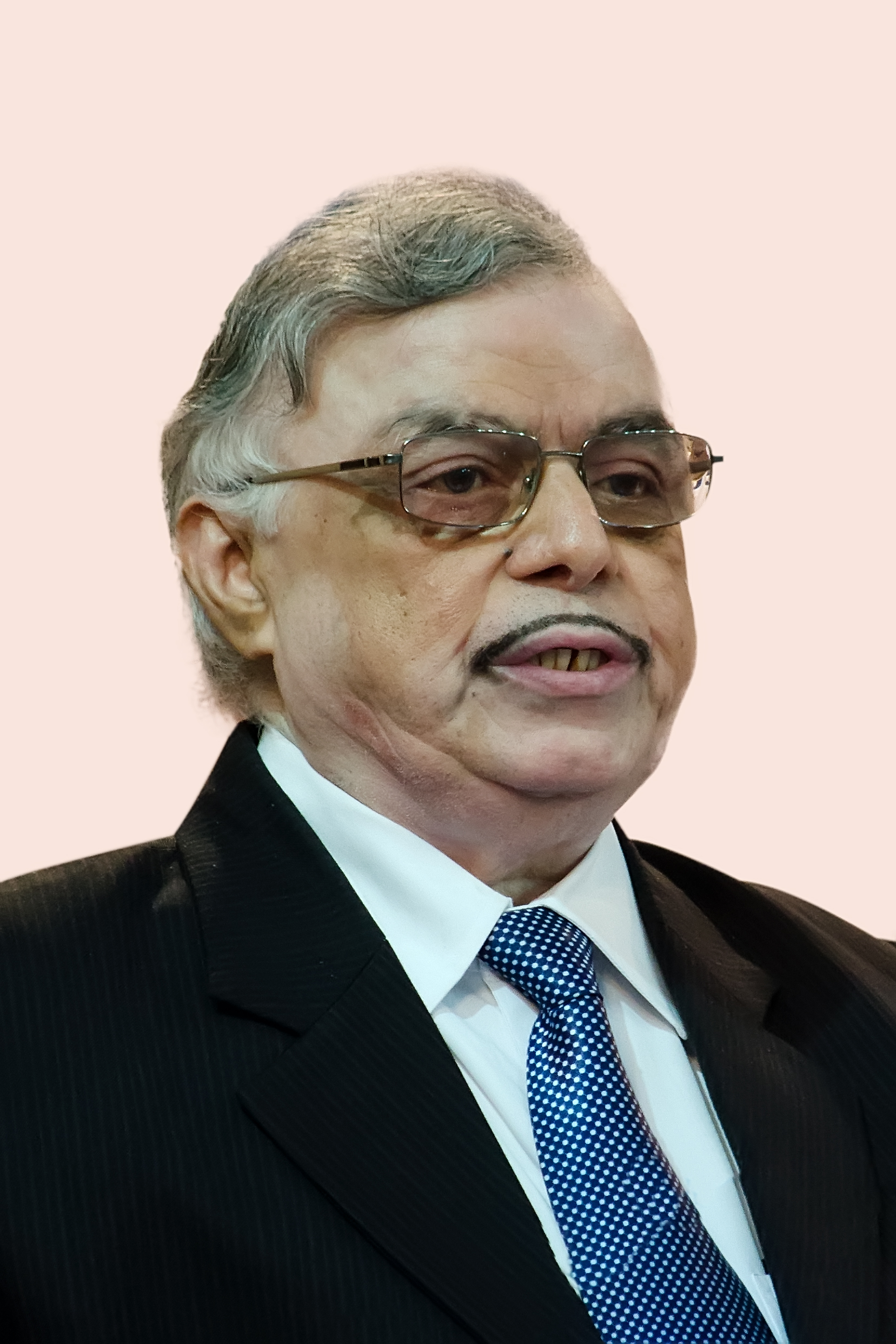
- Justice P. Sathasivam in 2015

21st Governor of Kerala
- In office 5 September 2014 – 5 September 2019
- Chief Minister: Oommen Chandy; Pinarayi Vijayan
- Preceded by: Sheila Dikshit
- Succeeded by: Arif Mohammad Khan

40th Chief Justice of India
- In office 19 July 2013 – 26 April 2014
- Appointed by: Pranab Mukherjee
- Preceded by: Altamas Kabir
- Succeeded by: Rajendra Mal Lodha

Personal details
- Born: 27 April 1949 (age 77) Kadappanallur, Bhavani, Erode, Tamil Nadu, India
- Education: University of Madras; Madurai Kamaraj University
- Profession: Judge

Palanisamy Sathasivam (born 27 April 1949) is a retired Indian judge who served as the 40th Chief Justice of India, holding the office from 2013 to 2014. On retirement from his judicial career, Sathasivam was appointed the 21st Governor of Kerala from 5 September 2014 to 4 September 2019. Sathasivam is the second judge from Tamil Nadu to become the CJI, after M. Patanjali Sastri. He is also the first former Chief Justice of the Supreme Court to be appointed the Governor of a state. He is the first Governor of Kerala to be appointed by the Narendra Modi Government.

== Early life ==
Sathasivam was born on 27 April 1949 in Kadappanallur near Bhavani in Erode district. He graduated from Government Law College, Chennai after completing his BA degree Ayya Nadar Janaki Ammal College, Sivakasi.

== Personal life ==
Sathasivam has a skin condition called vitiligo. He is married to Saraswathi.

== Career ==
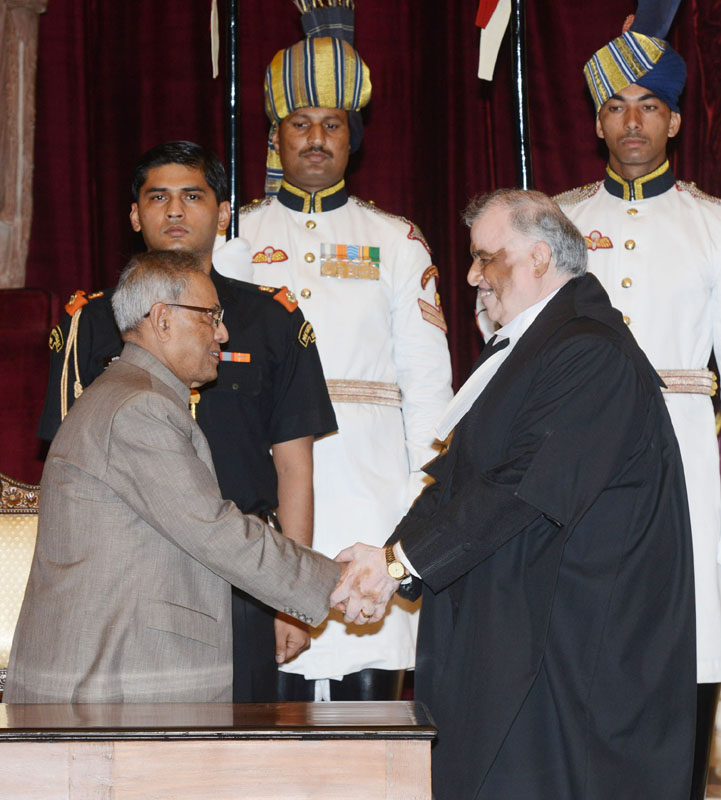
President Pranab Mukherjee greets the Chief Justice of India, Justice Sathasivam, after administering the oath of office to him, at a swearing-in ceremony, at Rashtrapati Bhavan, in New Delhi on 19 July 2013.

Sathasivam enrolled as an advocate on 25 July 1973 at Madras. He was then appointed to the post of additional government pleader, and later as the special government pleader in the Madras High Court. He was appointed as a permanent judge of the Madras High Court on 8 January 1996, and transferred to the Punjab and Haryana High Court on 20 April 2007. He was elevated to the post of Judge of Supreme Court on 21 August 2007. During his tenure as chief justice, he was the chairman of the General Council of the Gujarat National Law University. Over the course of his Supreme Court tenure, Sathasivam authored 338 judgments. He succeeded Sheila Dikshit as the Governor of Kerala in August 2014.

=== Notable judgments ===
Sathasivam authored several path-breaking judgments including the Reliance Gas Judgment (May 2010) where he observed that "in a national democracy like ours, the national assets belong to the people" and "the government owns such assets for the purposes of developing them in the interests of the people".

He also delivered the verdict in the triple-murder case of Graham Staines and commuted the death sentence of Dara Singh to life imprisonment in a controversial judgment. On 19 April 2010, he delivered the judgement in the Jessica Lal murder case of 29 April 1999. Along with Justice B. S. Chauhan, Sathasivam delivered the judgement in the 1993 Mumbai blasts case, sentencing Hindi cinema actor Sanjay Dutt to five years' imprisonment under the Arms Act. Dutt was asked to serve out the remainder of his sentence. According to The Hindu, "In a number of judgements, he [Sathasivam] cautioned the courts against awarding lesser sentence in crimes against women and children and showing undue sympathy towards the accused by altering the sentence to the extent of period already undergone."

In January 2014, a three-judge panel headed by Chief Justice Sathasivam commuted sentences of 15 death-row convicts, ruling that the "inordinate and inexplicable delay is a ground for commuting death penalty to life sentence". Supreme Court of India ruled that delays ranging from seven to 11 years in the disposal of mercy pleas are grounds for clemency. The same panel also passed a set of guidelines for the execution of a death row convict, which includes a 14-day gap from the receipt of communication of the rejection of first mercy petition to the scheduled execution date, after going through the Shatrughan Chouhan vs Union of India case.

Legal offices
Preceded by Altamas Kabir	Chief Justice of India; 19 July 2013 – 26 April 2014	Succeeded by Rajendra Mal Lodha
Political offices
Preceded by Sheila Dikshit	Governor of Kerala; 5 September 2014 – 6 September 2019	Succeeded by Arif Mohammad Khan
