= Unemployment in Kerala =

Unemployment in Kerala discusses the causes and measures of Kerala unemployment and strategies for reducing it. Job creation and unemployment are affected by factors such as economic conditions, global competition, education, automation, and demographics. These factors can affect the number of workers, the duration of unemployment, and wage levels.

== Features ==
=== Demographic ===
Kerala is a state on the southwestern Malabar Coast of India. It accounts for 1.18% of the total area of India as well as around 2.76% of its total population. With a density of 859 persons per km^{2}, its land is nearly three times as densely settled as the national average of 370 persons per km^{2}. In the state, the rate of population growth is India's lowest, and the decadal growth of 4.9% in 2011 is less than one third of the all-India average of 17.6%. Kerala's population more than doubled between 1951 and 1991 by adding 15.6 million people to reach 29.1 million residents in 1991; the population stood at 33.3 million by 2011. Kerala's coastal regions are the most densely settled with population of 2022 persons per km^{2}, 2.5 times the overall population density of the state, 859 persons per km^{2}, leaving the eastern hills and mountains comparatively sparsely populated. Kerala is the second-most urbanised major state in the country with 47.7% urban population according to the 2011 Census of India.

The state is a pioneer in many of the social development indices of India. Kerala has the lowest positive population growth rate in India, 3.44%; the highest Human Development Index (HDI), 0.784 in 2018 (0.712 in 2015); the highest literacy rate, 96.2% in the 2018 literacy survey conducted by the National Statistical Office, India; the highest life expectancy, 77 years; and the highest sex ratio, 1,084 women per 1,000 men. Kerala is the second-least impoverished state in India according to the Annual Report of Reserve Bank of India published in 2013. The state topped in the country to achieve the Sustainable Development Goals according to the annual report of NITI Aayog published in 2019.

=== Economic ===
Kerala's economy is primarily based on the concept of "democratic socialist welfare state". Some, such as Financial Express, use the term "Money Order Economy". The economy of Kerala significantly depends upon its service sector. In 2019–20, the service sector contributed around 63% of the state's GSVA, compared to 28% by industrial sector, and 8% by agricultural sector. In the period between 1960 and 2020, Kerala's economy was gradually shifting from an agrarian economy into a service-based one. Only 27.3% of the families in Kerala depend upon agriculture for their livelihood, which is also the least corresponding rate in India. In 2015–16 the figures were 63.66% for service sector, 24.27% for industrial sector, and 12.07% for agricultural sector. The state's per-capita income is much higher than the national average of India. This has fuelled internal migration to Kerala for low-end jobs, even as Keralites have emigrated—mostly to the Gulf countries—in search of better-paying jobs. The Kerala Economy is therefore also largely dependent on trade in services and resulted remittances. In 2012, the state was the highest receiver of overall remittances to India which stood at Rs. 499.65 billion (31.2% of the state's GDP), followed by Tamil Nadu, Punjab and Uttar Pradesh.

The state's service sector which accounts for around 65% of its revenue is mainly based upon its hospitality industry, tourism, ayurveda and medical services, pilgrimage, information technology, transportation, financial sector, and education. Major initiatives under the industrial sector include Cochin Shipyard, shipbuilding, oil refinery, software industry, coastal mineral industries, food processing, marine products processing, and rubber-based products. The primary sector of the state is mainly based upon cash crops. Kerala produces a significant amount of national output of the cash crops such as coconut, tea, coffee, pepper, natural rubber, cardamom, and cashew in India. The cultivation of food crops began to reduce since the 1950s. The migrant labourers in Kerala are a significant workforce in its industrial and agricultural sectors. Being home to only 1.18% of the total land area of India and 2.75% of its population, Kerala contributes more than 4% to the gross domestic product of India.

== Unemployment rate ==
The Unemployment rate of Kerala is higher than the national average of India. The rate among youth between 15 and 29 years of age stood at 40.5% in Kerala between January and March 2020 as per the Periodic Labour Force Survey (PLFS) published by the Government of India. However the national rate was only 21%, according to the survey released on 31 December 2020. The PLFS defines unemployment as "The percentage of people unemployed of the total available labour force, both employed and unemployed." Overall unemployment rate of Kerala in 2018-19 was 9% according to the PLFS report compared to the national average of 5.8%. In 2017–18, the unemployment rate of Kerala stood at 11.4% while that of India was 6.1%. The Economic Review Report tabled in the Kerala Legislative Assembly revealed that the corresponding rate among youth was around 36% in 2018–19, which was again more than twice the national average rate of 17%. However, rural-urban divide is not seen in the unemployment rate of Kerala, much like that of the other indices of the state, and unlike most of the other states of India. The rural rate among youth between 15 and 29 years of age stood at 35.8% while its urban counterpart was 34.6% in 2018–19.

== Structure of unemployment ==
The structure of unemployment and job seekers in the southwestern state of Kerala varies significantly from the rest of India. K. P. Kannan, a development economist in Kerala, calls it as Educated Unemployment, in which a person can't find desired job according to his educational qualification. Other varying factor of Kerala with respect to rest of India is the higher number of female job seekers with respect to its male counterpart.

=== Genderwise distribution ===
The genderwise distribution of job seekers in Kerala differ significantly from that of the rest of India. More than 60% of the total job seekers in Kerala are women, with most of them are well-educated. It is also seen that the unemployment rate among the women job seekers is much higher than that among the male job seekers. A comparison among the unemployment rate of men and women of Kerala and India of the age group 15–29 in the year 2011–12 is given below:

Unemployment Rate of the Youth (Age group: 15–29) in Kerala and India (2011–12)
Rural						Urban					
Male		Female		Total		Male		Female		Total	
Kerala	India	Kerala	India	Kerala	India	Kerala	India	Kerala	India	Kerala	India
9.7%	5.0%	47.4%	4.8%	21.7%	4.9%	8.4%	8.1%	28.9%	13.1%	18.0%	9.2%

=== Educational qualification ===
In Kerala, the unemployment rate is higher for those who have higher educational qualifications. The rate is much higher for those who are graduates. Around 25% of the Postgraduates are unemployed while nearly 17% of each of those who have attained either a technical degree or vocational training are unemployed.

Unemployment rate by Skill in Kerala (15 years and above)
General education	Rate of Unemployment	Vocational Training	Rate of Unemployment
Not Literate	4.6%	Formal	14.9%
Just Literate	4.1%	Informal	3.5%
Primary	2.4%	No Training	9.7%
Middle	4.1%	Graduate	16.2%
Secondary	10.2%	Diploma	20.3%
Higher Secondary	18.8%	Post Graduate Diploma	25.7%
Graduate	20.0%	No Qualification	7.7%
Post-Graduate	23.3%		

== Statistics ==
=== Terms and definitions ===
- Usual Status:The activity status determined on the basis of the reference period of last 365 days preceding the date of survey.
- Currently Week Status (CWS):The activity status determined on the basis of a reference period of last 7 days preceding the date of survey.

=== Labour Force Participation Rate ===
LFPR is defined as the ratio of the section of working-age population currently employed or seeking employment to the total working-age population.

Labour Force Participation Rate (LFPR) according to Usual Status - 2017-18 and 2018-19 (In %)
Sl.no	Age group	Rural			Urban			Total			Rural			Urban			Total		
Sl.no	Age group	M	F	P	M	F	P	M	F	P	M	F	P	M	F	P	M	F	P
		Kerala 2017-18									India 2017-18								
1	15–29 years	55.1	20.8	37.2	48.4	27.6	37.8	52.2	23.6	37.4	58.9	15.9	38.1	58.5	17.5	38.5	58.8	16.4	38.2
2	15–59 years	79.5	31.1	53.6	78.1	33.0	53.6	78.9	31.9	53.6	80.2	26.6	53.6	80.1	22.3	51.6	80.2	25.3	53.0
3	15 years and above	71.1	25.9	46.6	68.9	27.3	46.4	70.1	26.5	46.5	76.4	24.6	50.7	74.5	20.4	47.6	75.8	23.3	49.8
4	All ages	54.1	20.7	36.4	53.6	22.1	36.8	53.9	21.3	36.6	54.9	18.2	37.0	57.0	15.9	36.8	55.5	17.5	36.9
		Kerala 2018-19									India 2018-19								
1	15–29 years	43.3	23.0	32.9	51.6	29.1	39.9	47.0	25.8	36.0	58.8	15.8	37.8	58.6	17.1	38.7	58.8	16.2	38.1
2	15–59 years	76.5	35.5	54.6	79.9	35.0	55.4	78.1	35.2	55.0	80.6	28.3	54.5	79.6	22.5	51.6	80.3	26.5	53.6
3	15 years and above	71.0	31.3	49.7	71.4	29.7	48.8	71.2	30.6	49.3	76.4	26.4	51.5	73.7	20.4	47.5	75.5	24.5	50.2
4	All ages	56.9	25.0	39.7	56.3	24.2	39.2	56.6	24.6	39.5	55.1	19.7	37.7	56.7	16.1	36.9	55.6	18.6	37.5

_{†M:Male, F:Female, P:Person}

=== Worker Population Ratio ===
WPR is defined as the percentage of employed persons in the population.

Worker Population Ratio in Kerala and India - 2018–19 (in %)
Male								Female								Person							
15–29 years		15–59 years		15 years and above		All ages		15–29 years		15–59 years		15 years and above		All ages		15–29 years		15–59 years		15 years and above		All ages	
K	I	K	I	K	I	K	I	K	I	K	I	K	I	K	I	K	I	K	I	K	I	K	I
36.1	48.6	73.5	75.1	67.7	71.0	53.8	52.3	11.5	13.3	28.5	25.0	25.3	23.3	20.4	17.6	23.4	31.5	49.3	50.3	44.9	47.3	35.9	35.3

_{†K:Kerala, I:India}

=== Average wage earnings per day ===
Kerala offers the best wages in unorganised sector among the subnational entities of South Asia, which might be a pull factor for the migrant labourers in Kerala. According to the India Wage Report prepared by International Labour Organization in 2018, the states with the consistent highest casual wages in both rural and urban areas are Kerala, Jammu and Kashmir, Punjab, and Haryana. The existing wages for casual workers in Kerala are around 65% higher than that of India. It is notable that the wage rates for women in Kerala is 50% more than that of their counterparts in India. However, it is much lesser than their male counterparts in Kerala.

Average wage earnings per day from casual labour work other than public works in Currently Week Status (CWS) for Kerala and India, in ₹
Period	K/I	Rural			Urban			Total		
Period	K/I	M	F	P	M	F	P	M	F	P
July–September 2018	Kerala	641.83	357.79	598.79	710.13	422.76	676.4	664.82	375.6	624.23
July–September 2018	India	276.92	170.1	253.93	342.15	204.73	319.3	287.88	174.54	264.38
October–December 2018	Kerala	659.41	377.8	605.64	678.44	365.85	649.06	666.26	375.43	620.16
October–December 2018	India	286.84	185.64	264.63	348.76	226.25	331.24	297.86	190.26	275.59
January–March 2019	Kerala	677.53	403.4	651.61	684.01	332.02	649.73	680.07	374.84	650.87
January–March 2019	India	287.36	190.23	267.42	357.53	220.22	339.15	299.08	193.44	278.56
April–June 2019	Kerala	732.17	388.32	697.18	680.32	372.25	648.27	710.77	381.59	676.96
April–June 2019	India	297.44	199.24	278.62	367.65	244.15	351.82	309.77	204.49	290.7

_{†M:Male, F:Female, P:Person}

=== Unemployment rate ===
It is the percentage of persons unemployed among the persons in the labour force.

Unemployment Rate in Kerala and India - 2017-18 and 2018-19 (in %)
Sl.no	Age group	Rural			Urban			Total			Rural			Urban			Total		
Sl.no	Age group	M	F	P	M	F	P	M	F	P	M	F	P	M	F	P	M	F	P
		Kerala 2017-18									India 2017-18								
1	15–29 years	20.5	61.7	32.5	27.4	65.2	41.5	23.3	63.4	36.3	17.4	13.6	16.6	8.7	27.2	20.6	17.8	17.9	17.8
2	15–59 years	6.6	21.3	11.2	7.5	29.0	14.7	7.0	24.8	12.7	6.3	4.0	5.7	7.3	11.3	8.2	6.6	6.0	6.5
3	15 years and above	5.9	19.6	10.0	6.6	27.4	13.2	6.2	23.2	11.4	5.7	3.8	5.3	6.9	10.8	7.7	6.1	5.6	6.0
4	All ages	5.9	19.6	10.0	6.6	27.5	13.2	6.2	23.2	11.4	5.8	3.8	5.3	7.1	10.8	7.8	6.2	5.7	6.1
		Kerala 2018-19									India 2018-19								
1	15–29 years	23.4	57.8	35.8	23.1	53.1	34.6	23.3	55.4	35.2	16.6	13.8	16.0	18.7	25.7	20.2	17.2	17.7	17.3
2	15–59 years	5.6	17.8	9.9	6.0	20.7	11.0	5.8	19.1	10.4	6.0	3.8	5.4	7.4	10.3	8.3	8.0	5.5	6.2
3	15 years and above	4.7	15.6	8.4	5.2	18.8	9.7	4.9	17.0	9.0	5.5	3.5	5.0	7.0	9.8	7.6	6.0	5.1	5.8
4	All ages	4.7	15.6	8.4	5.2	18.8	9.7	5.0	17.1	9.0	5.6	3.5	5.0	7.1	9.9	7.7	6.0	5.2	5.8

_{†M:Male, F:Female, P:Person}

Unemployment rate in Kerala - 2018–19, both Usual Status and Currently Week Status (in %)
Rural						Urban						Total					
Male		Female		Person		Male		Female		Person		Male		Female		Person	
ps+ss	CWS	ps+ss	CWS	ps+ss	CWS	ps+ss	CWS	ps+ss	CWS	ps+ss	CWS	ps+ss	CWS	ps+ss	CWS	ps+ss	CWS
4.7	8.0	15.6	19.0	8.4	11.6	5.2	7.9	18.8	20.9	9.7	12.1	4.9	8.0	17.0	19.8	9.0	11.8

_{†ps+ss:Usual Status, CWS:Currently Week Status}

=== Distribution of employment ===
Employment in the Organised Sector-Kerala (in Lakh)
Sector	2010	2011	2012	2013	2014	2015	2016	2017	2018	2019	2020
Public	6.1	6.1	5.8	5.7	5.8	5.7	5.6	5.6	5.5	5.6	5.5
Private	5.0	5.0	5.1	5.2	5.5	5.7	6.1	6.1	6.6	6.9	6.9

Distribution of Employment in Public Sector (2020)
1. Central Government (11.0%)
2. State Government (47.0%)
3. Central Quasi Government (15.0%)
4. State Quasi Government (23.0%)
5. Local Self Government Institutions (4.00%)

Women Participation in Public Sector Employment in 2019-20
Sl.no	Branch	No. of Women Employed	Share (%)
1	State Government	104,628	54.2
2	State Quasi Government Sector	38,666	20.0
3	Central Government	14,745	7.6
4	Central Quasi Government Sector	25,968	13.4
5	Local Self Government Institutions	9,217	4.8
	Total	193,224	100.0

Distribution of Employment in Organised Sector, both Public and Private (March-2020)
Sector	Percent
Manufacturing	18.33%
Education	17.86%
Administrative and support service activities	8.92%
Financial and insurance activities	7.97%
Public Administration and defence; compulsory social security	7.76%
Information and communication	6.61%
Professional, Scientific, and technical activities	6.50%
Human health and social work activities	6.26%
Agriculture, forestry, and fishing	5.76%
Wholesale and Retail trade, Repair of Motor Vehicles and Motor Cycles	4.29%
Transportation and Storage	4.13%
Accommodation and food Service activities	1.85%
Construction	1.11%
Electricity, gas, steam, and air Conditioning supply	0.65%
Distribution of employment Source: Economic Review 2020, Kerala

=== Employment exchanges ===
==== Registered job seekers ====
Kerala had around 4,330,000 job seekers on 31 December 2012, who had registered in the live register of state employment exchanges. However, it decreased to around 3,430,000 by 31 July 2020. A decline of nearly 900,000 occurred in the number of the registered job seekers within 8 years. As on 31 July 2020, 63.6% of the registered job seekers in Kerala are women. Around 92.1% of total job seekers in the state have at least qualified their secondary schooling. The number of professional and technical job seekers is around 350,000, as on 31 July 2020. Technical, Diploma, or Engineering certificate holders together constitute more than 70% of the professional and technical job seekers. The number of engineering graduates among the registered job seekers is 47,525, while their medical counterpart is only 9,000.

Work seekers in Kerala (in Lakh)
	2005	2010	2011	2012	2013	2014	2015	2016	2017	2018	2019	2020 (to 31 July)
Total Work Seekers (in Lakh)	34.9	41.6	42.0	43.3	37.3	36.2	34.9	35.6	35.0	35.6	35.2	34.3

Job seekers in Kerala as on July 31, 2020 (Status of Men and Women)
District		Work Seekers (in Lakh)	
District wise map of Kerala	Name	Male	Female
	Kasaragod	0.3	0.6
	Kannur	0.8	1.5
	Wayanad	0.4	0.6
	Kozhikode	1.0	2.0
	Malappuram	1.0	1.7
	Palakkad	0.8	1.4
	Thrissur	0.9	1.8
	Ernakulam	1.2	2.1
	Idukki	0.4	0.6
	Kottayam	0.8	1.3
	Alappuzha	1.0	1.6
	Pathanamthitta	0.5	0.9
	Kollam	1.4	2.3
	Thiruvananthapuram	1.9	3.4

_{Source:Directorate of Employment, Government of Kerala}

==== Placements ====
The number of placements through Employment Exchanges in Kerala is much less than the number of total registered job seekers in the state. The total placement has been declining since 2010. From 2015 to 2018, it has been increasing. However, in 2019, it again declined as compared to 2018 figures.

Placement through Employment Exchanges - Kerala
	2005	2010	2011	2012	2013	2014	2015	2016	2017	2018	2019	2020 (to 31 July)
Placement (in numbers)	11,450	12,643	12,150	11,731	8,841	8,792	10,303	10,212	11,647	12,887	12,027	5,759

== Government policies ==
The Government of Kerala has initiated some policies and projects to reduce problems caused by the state's unemployment. Some of the projects are:

- Kerala Startup Mission: Introduced in 2006.
- Kaivalya: Introduced in 2016.
- Self-Employment Schemes:
1. Kerala Self-Employment Scheme for the Registered Unemployed (KESRU): Introduced in 1999.
2. Multi-Purpose Service Centres/Job Clubs (MPSC/JC).
3. Saranya.
- Employability Centres.
- Career Development Centres.
- Model Career Centre.
- Unemployment Assistance: Introduced in 1982.
- Niyukthi-2020.

== See also ==
- Unemployment in India
- Kerala Startup Mission
- Migrant labourers in Kerala
- Kerala Gulf diaspora
- Demographics of Kerala
- Education in Kerala
- Economy of Kerala
- Kerala model
- Kerala Public Service Commission
- Public sector undertakings in Kerala
