= Kerala Gulf diaspora =

Ethnic group

ഗൾഫ് മലയാളി الخليج الماليالي Gulf Malayali
Total population
- 3.5 million (2020 est.)

Regions with significant populations
- UAE: 773,624
- Kuwait: 634,728
- Saudi Arabia: 447,440
- Qatar: 445,000
- Oman: 134,019
- Bahrain: 101,556

Languages
- Malayalam, Gulf Arabic

Religion
- Hinduism, Islam, Christianity

The Kerala Gulf diaspora refers to the people of Kerala living in the West Asian Arab states of the Persian Gulf. A report presented in 2014, estimates that 90 percent of Kerala's 2.36 million-strong diaspora resides in the Middle East. Nearly 80 percent of Indians living in Kuwait are from Kerala according to the 2008 survey commissioned by the Department of Non-resident Keralite Affairs.

== The Gulf Boom ==
The "Gulf Boom" refers to the mass migration of a large number of people from the Indian state of Kerala to the GCC states from 1972 to 1983. Largely consisting of the migration of Malayalis, the dominant indigenous ethnic group in Kerala, the movement of many migrant workers from Kerala to the GCC states continues to the present day, although in smaller numbers after the 2008 international financial crisis began to affect the GCC region. This initial wave of migration is usually referred to as the Kerala Gulf Boom. In 2010, the GCC states contained a total Keralite population of more than 3.5 million, who annually sent home a sum of around $6.81 billion (US), which is more than 15.13% of the total Remittance to India in 2008. In 2013 the remittance was more the 60,000 crore (600 billion) rupees.

== Background ==
Huge oil reserves were discovered in the Eastern Arabia region (Arab states of the Persian Gulf) in the 1930s, with large-scale commercial extraction beginning in the early 1950s. Soon, these countries became major world oil-exporting countries, amassing huge riches within a matter of years, a feat that perhaps has no historical parallel. However, these nations were disadvantaged by small populations and labour forces, with commensurately small skills levels. To meet the challenge they faced, they had to substantially increase immigration at all levels. India, which faced very high unemployment rates, quickly saw the opportunity for its citizens to gain a share of the new work opportunities, with manual workers from Kerala at the forefront. Historical ties and the religious identity of Indian Muslims—many Keralite migrants are Muslim.

== Causes of migration ==
Poverty was shown to be the primary reason for migration, even though unemployment was a contributing issue for some of them. Another major reason for the migration was the availability of various types of visa like Free Visa, Employment visa and Umrah Visa. 39.4% of the migrants used Free visa as this was provided without mentioning the sort of employment and it was not strictly regulated. 28.5% of the migrants attained employment visas where one must meet certain educational and professional requirements to obtain it. About 32.1% utilized Umrah visas that are meant for Muslims to perform one of the holy pilgrimages in Saudi Arabia. Once they get the Umrah visa, and enter the country, the migrants switch to acquiring visas or permanent work permits. However, up until 2009, some people in Saudi Arabia who were remaining on Umrah visas worked illegally, mostly in lowly occupations, and were frequently deported if discovered.

The tradition of dowry which can be in the form of money, jewelry, real estate, automobiles, and household goods, etc was also a cause of migration. A majority from the community chose to leave Kerala as a result of the strain of covering these marriage-related expenses, especially families that had more girls than boys. First-generation migrants were also greatly motivated by the possibility of using their money to construct better homes and set up weddings for their sisters or daughters.

== Financial sources of migration ==
Migrants relied on bank loans, loans from friends and family, and the liquidation of assets like gold and landed property to finance their move from their villages to different gulf countries. Notably, just 33.6% of migrants were able to pay for their migration on their own; 16.1% turned to loans, and 24.1% borrowed money from other sources. Furthermore, 2.9% of them had to sell their landed properties and 23.4% of them sold gold. This demonstrates the significant financial risks immigrants take on in their quest for greater work prospects, a better living, and higher income. The village's poverty rate significantly decreased after the Gulf migration, and remittances were a major contributing factor to this improvement.

== Representation in Mollywood ==
There has been a significant impact on the Malayalam industry from Gulf Migration as evidenced by the prevalence of Gulf-based themes in several films. Films like Vilkkanundu Swapnangal and Nilavu contributed to highlight the hardships suffered by the migrants and their emotional journeys by showcasing their adversity and dreams of Keralites in Gulf. Pathemari (English: Dhow) is a 2015 Malayalam-language period drama film written and directed by Salim Ahamed whose plot follows the life of Pallikkal Narayanan (Mammootty) who migrated to the Middle-East in the early 1960s, when the Kerala Gulf boom was just beginning. Pathemari and Khaddama depicted the struggles experienced by women and laborers in Gulf. The Aadujeevitham (film) based on the novel Aadujeevitham highlights the real life incident struggles by Haripad native Najeeb Mohammed (Prithviraj Sukumaran) who is forced to work as a goatherd and a cattle herd in a remote Saudi Arabian farm. Furthermore, Non-Resident Keralites have made large financial investments in the Malayalam film industry, supporting this trend.

== Effects on the economy and society of Kerala ==
Remittances are a key source of income for Kerala's economy. In 2003 for instance, remittances were 1.74 times the revenue receipts of the state, 7 times the transfers to the state from the Central Government, 1.8 times the annual expenditure of the Kerala Government, and 15 to 18 times the size of foreign exchange earned from the export of cashew and marine products.

Gulf migrants, many of whom were from the working and the lower-middle classes, gradually gained social status. A myth was in the making: that of the 'Gulf man'. Gulf migrants were highly sought after as bridegrooms. Their attractive earnings, irrespective of their shortcomings, enabled them to marry into wealthy and respected families when they returned home.

The Gulf Dream has also found its expression in Malayalam cinema and literature. M. Mukundan's Daivathinte Vikrithikal draws out in detail the socio-economic impacts of Gulf migration on the enclave of Mahe.

== Cultural shifts through consumerism in Kerala ==
Kerala's cultural environment has undergone significant change as a result of the Gulf migration boom; this is especially true of the creation of a thriving consumerist culture. The influx of Gulf influences may be seen in the growth of Gulf marketplaces, including Dubai Bazar and Gulf Souq, which have been present in different Kerala sites since the 1980s, including Beemappalli, Chemmad, Kochi, Kozhikode, Malappuram, and Kannur. These marketplaces supplied 'Gulf items' to migrants who were trying to meet expectations from their families, in addition to serving the local population. The influence on culture also extended to the culinary scene, as Arabian eateries sprung up all over the place serving well-known dishes like mandi, shawarma, and Yemeni biryani. Simultaneously, the adoption of parda / burkha, a traditional Islamic dress, became a dominant fashion trend in several districts of Kerala for more than two decades. This trend was encouraged by retailers capitalizing on its popularity as well as cultural considerations.

== Reverse Migration ==
Since the implementation of nationalization policies in the Gulf countries, Kerala witnessed a wave of reverse migration of expats. The Kingdom of Saudi Arabia introduced Nitaqat in 2011. This move led to the similar rules in the other GCC countries in which Bahrinisation, Qatarisation and Emiratisation were gained momentum in 2010s. With the outbreak of COVID-19, many expats were compelled to come back due to health and financial emergencies. Reverse migration is continuing from the Gulf due to a number of factors including the wars and financial crises.

== Notable personalities ==
- Atlas Ramachandran - Jewellery, Film & Culture - Atlas Jewellery
- M. A. Yousuf Ali - Retail & Money Exchange - Lulu Group of companies
- Joy Alukkas - Jewellery, Fashion & Lifestyle, Money Exchange - Joyalukkas Group
- B. Ravi Pillai - Diversified - RP Group
- Azad Moopen - Healthcare - Aster DM Healthcare
- R.Harikumar - Aluminium Extrusion - Elite Group
- P. Mohamed Ali - Construction & Oilfield Supplies -Galfar Engineering and Contracting SAOG
- P. V. Abdul Wahab - Diversified - Peevees & Bridgeway Group
- Shamsheer Vayalil - Healthcare - VPS Healthcare
- P. N. C. Menon - Construction - Sobha Ltd.
- Sunny Varkey - Education - GEMS

== See also ==
- Department of Non Resident Keralites Affairs
- Migrant labourers in Kerala
- Economy of Kerala
- Unemployment in Kerala
