= Kerala Infrastructure Investment Fund Board =

Government agency

- Abbreviation: KIIFB
- Formation: 11 November 1999; 26 years ago
- Headquarters: Thiruvananthapuram, India
- Chairperson: Chief minister of Kerala
- Vice Chairperson: Minister for Finance, Govt of Kerala
- CEO: Vacant
- Parent organization: Finance Department, Govt. of Kerala
- Website: kiifb.org

Kerala Infrastructure Investment Fund Board (KIIFB) was constituted by Government of Kerala as a Body Corporate financial institution in the Indian state of Kerala to mobilize funds for infrastructure development from outside the state revenue. KIIFB is a statutory body constituted by the 'Kerala Infrastructure Investment Fund Act, 1999' (Act 4 of 2000).

The current mandate of KIIFB is to provide funding support to priority major projects at a total outlay of INR 50,000 Cr in five years starting from the financial year 2016–17. So far KIIFB has approved 821 projects for INR 60,102.51 Cr. The projects cover all the vital sectors like Education, Health Care, Transport (roads, bridges, waterways and light metro rail), Electricity, Water Supply etc.

== Funding Process ==
KIIFB's funding process starts either with declaring priority projects for KIIFB funding in the State Budget Speech or with a decision of the Council of Ministers for the same. Following it, the Administrative Departments concerned issue Administrative Sanction Orders and appoint Special Purpose Vehicles (SPVs) for the preparation of detailed implementation plans and implement the same. From that initial stage onward KIIFB arranges expert support for Administrative Departments and SPVs to develop all project-related documents following standards to ensure KIIFB's funding approval and enter into the implementation phase on a time-bound manner.

== Issuance of Masala Bond ==
KIIFB has become the first sub-sovereign entity in India to tap the offshore Rupee international bond market with the US$312 million equivalent (₹ 2,150 crore) senior secured fixed-rate bond -Masala Bond. The bond, with a five-year tenor and a 9.723 per cent interest, has been admitted to London Stock Exchange's International Securities Market (ISM) on 17 May 2019.

== Kerala Nirmithi Awareness Campaign ==
Major projects Funded by KIIFB are marked on Kerala Map

On 20 December 2019, KIIFB started a 13 months long infrastructure awareness campaign called Kerala Nirmithi to familiarize people with the need for infrastructure projects and the projects taken up with the funding support of KIIFB. It is being conducted in all the districts of Kerala. The expo connected to the campaign gives people opportunity to see 3D models and Virtual Reality presentations of infrastructure projects and to discuss the technical details with experts. Competitions for students are also being organized.

== See also ==
- List of departments and agencies of the Government of Kerala
- Economy of Kerala
- Roads in Kerala
- Education in Kerala
