= Kerala Startup Mission =

Agency for entrepreneurship, Kerala, India

- Industry: Technology business incubator
- Founded: 2006
- Headquarters: Thiruvananthapuram, India
- Key people: Anoop P Ambika (Chief Executive Officer)
- Website: www.startupmission.kerala.gov.in

Kerala Startup Mission (KSUM), formerly known as Technopark TBI, is a state-level agency under the Government of Kerala, India, dedicated to fostering entrepreneurship and incubation activities. Established primarily to manage the Technology Business Incubator (TBI), a startup accelerator, KSUM aims to cultivate a conducive environment for high-technology-based businesses.

== Objectives ==
KSUM's core objectives include:

- Incubation and Acceleration: Planning, establishing, and managing the TBI to support technology-based startups.
- Ecosystem Development: Coordinating with other incubators, strengthening entrepreneurship initiatives, and promoting knowledge-driven startups.
- Talent Development: Encouraging student, faculty, and local entrepreneurship, and building human resources capacity.
- Industry Linkage: Facilitating connections between startups and industry, and establishing research and development facilities.
- Institutional Support: Promoting Innovation and Entrepreneurship Development Cells (IEDCs) and technoparks within academic institutions.

== Programs ==
=== Incubation programme ===
KSUM supports the development of technology-based business ventures through a structured incubation process. Startups typically progress through three primary stages: pre-incubation, incubation, and acceleration.

Pre-incubation is an initial phase lasting approximately three to six months, primarily focused on idea generation and refinement. During incubation (six to twelve months), startups engage in product development and market preparation. KSUM provides physical workspace, financial support, mentorship, and entrepreneurial training during this stage. The acceleration phase (three to six months) involves refining the business model and preparing for investment. KSUM offers business advisory services and investor matchmaking at this stage.

These programs are designed to nurture early-stage startups and facilitate their growth into sustainable enterprises.

=== KSUM - EY Accelerator ===
KSUM has partnered with Ernst & Young to establish a Business & Technology Accelerator at the KINFRA Film & Video Park in Thiruvananthapuram. The accelerator provides a 1500 square foot workspace and comprehensive support services for selected Kerala-based startups.

The program offers a six-month acceleration phase, with the option to extend for an additional six months. Participants receive mentorship in business strategy, finance, human resources, investment proposal development, emerging technologies, and market research. The accelerator also facilitates networking opportunities with industry leaders, angel investors, and venture capitalists.

The goal of the program is to enhance the business acumen and capabilities of participating startups.

=== Knowledge Labs ===
To facilitate rapid prototyping and research and development, KSUM provides access to shared facilities. These include a FabLab for prototyping, as well as AI, XR, and Design Labs equipped with new technology. By providing access to these resources, KSUM allows startups to transform their ideas into working products.

==== Fab Lab ====
The Kerala Startup Mission (KSUM), with the support of the Government of Kerala, has established two Massachusetts Institute of Technology (MIT) Fab Labs in the state: one at Technopark, Trivandrum, within the Indian Institute of Information Technology and Management, Kerala (IIITM-K), and another at the Kerala Technology Innovation Zone (KTIZ) in Kochi. A Fab Lab is a technical prototyping platform designed to stimulate local entrepreneurship and foster innovation. It provides access to digital fabrication tools, empowering individuals to create custom-made products. Beyond local impact, Fab Labs connect users to a global network of learners, educators, technologists, and innovators.

KSUM's Fab Lab initiative, in collaboration with the Center for Bits and Atoms Fab Lab Foundation at MIT, aims to encourage startups in fields like printed electronics. By providing access to advanced prototyping equipment and a supportive ecosystem, the Fab Labs contribute to Kerala's growing innovation landscape.

==== Super Fab Lab ====
Kerala made history in 2020 by inaugurating India's first Super Fab Lab in Kochi, a collaborative venture with the Massachusetts Institute of Technology (MIT). Occupying a 10,000 square foot space, the lab is equipped with machinery valued at over ₹7 crore. This facility, located at the Integrated Startup Complex (ISC), is the only one of its kind outside the United States.

The Super Fab Lab is designed to propel hardware innovation and development, offering researchers, innovators, and developers capabilities beyond those of traditional Fab Labs. Its establishment positions Kerala as a significant hub for technology and entrepreneurship.

== Other Programmes ==
=== Learn To Code (Raspberry Pi Program) ===
The Kerala government launched the initiative "Learn to Code" in 2015. During phase 1 of the initiative, 2500 Raspberry Pi computer programming kits were distributed to class VIII students (14 years old). The project's aim is to add 40,000 talented young programmers to the maker community being developed through programmes initiated by KSUM. Subsequently, KSUM and the IT@School Project initiated the Kerala Raspberry Pi Competition for students who received the Raspberry Pi kit.

=== Startup Box ===
In 2015, the Kerala government, through the Kerala Startup Mission (KSUM), launched the Startup Box Programme to encourage young entrepreneurs. This initiative provided aspiring entrepreneurs with a comprehensive package including essential documents for company formation and technological resources like Arduino starter kits. The program aimed to support up to 50 student teams annually.

=== LEAP Coworks space ===
KSUM operates LEAP Coworks, a network of co-working spaces across Kerala. The acronym LEAP stands for Launch, Empower, Accelerate, Prosper.

== See also ==
- Economy of Kerala
- Unemployment in Kerala
