= P. Mohamed Ali =

Indian-born businessperson

- Born: June 6, 1949 (age 77); Thalikulam, Thrissur, India
- Occupation: Businessman
- Employer(s): Founder of Galfar Engineering and Contracting Co

Parambathekandi Mohamed Ali is a non-resident Indian businessman. He is the founder of Galfar Engineering and Contracting. The Oman Government has awarded and subsequently after his conviction withdrawn "Civil Order Grade Three" to him for his contribution to the country.

== Career ==
In 1972, Ali founded Galfar Engineering and Contracting, in the Sultanate of Oman, along with Sheikh Dr. Salim Said Al Fannah Al Araimi and Shiekh Mohamed Rashid Al Fannah Al Araimi. Galfar began as a small construction company and grew to become Oman's largest private sector employer. Galfar Engineering & Contracting SAOG (Galfar) is Oman's largest construction company with EPC capability in Oil & Gas, Roads & Bridges and Civil, Marine Infrastructure and Utilities & Service sectors operating in Oman, other GCC countries as well as India. For over 40 years, Galfar has established itself as the "Preferred Partner in Development" in Oman with a turnover above US$1 Billion. The company has grown steadily over the last five decades, operates a fleet of more than 8000 equipment, while employing a workforce of over 20,000 and is the largest employer of Omani nationals in the private sector. Galfar has extended out to India and neighbouring Persian Gulf countries such as Kuwait. During his time at Galfar, Ali founded and was chair of the Oman Petroleum Alliance, an organization dedicated to maintaining the standards for oil and gas refining and production in Oman.

== Achievements, awards and honor ==
Ali was awarded the Asian Business Leadership Forum Award (ABLF Award), for Business Courage 2013 which was collected on his behalf by his family members on account of his incarceration.

== Philanthropy ==
During his tenure at Galfar, Ali has founded numerous non-profits and social initiatives in an effort to give back not only Oman, but his birth country of India. He founded and pioneered universities and secondary schools such as Yenopoya University & Islamic Academy of Education, CSM Central School, Indian School, the Oman Medical College, and the Caledonian College of Engineering, in both Oman and India. Ali has also created many youth education initiatives and foundations to foster better education in India and the GCC region. The Social Advancement Foundation of India (SAFI) and the P M Foundation were created to help assist families and communities in providing better education to their children and to help communities develop socially and economically through the education of their youth.

== Controversies ==
On 11 January 2014, Ali was the principal accused of three individuals convicted on multiple (five convictions) bribery charges for a deal that extended Ali's Galfar contract with Petroleum Development Oman (PDO). In addition to an OMR 600,000 (~ US$1.56 million on the primary case) fine, he was sentenced to fifteen years imprisonment under multiple (five) counts. Oman's Court of First Instance on Sunday, 9 March 2014 sentenced P Mohammad Ali, former managing director of Galfar Engineering and Contracting SAOG, to 15 years in jail and slapped a fine of OMR 1.7 million (Dh 16.9 million or US$4.61 million) after convicting him in five graft cases in addition to the above sentences. . He was released from prison as part of an eid holiday linked pardon issued by Sultan Qaboos bin Said and released on 6 June 2016 after serving 2 years out of a 15 year commuted rigorous imprisonment sentence.
