= Masala bonds =

Bonds denominated in Indian rupees

Masala bonds are bonds issued outside India but denominated in Indian rupees. Masala is a Hindi word meaning spices. The term was first used by the International Finance Corporation (IFC) to evoke the culture and cuisine of India.

== Tranches of masala bonds issued ==
- The first Masala bond was issued by the World Bank-backed IFC in November 2014 when it raised ₹10 billion (1,000 crore) in bonds to fund infrastructure projects in India.
- In August 2015, the IFC, for the first time, issued green masala bonds and raised ₹3.15 billion to be used for private sector investments that address climate change in India.
- In July 2016, HDFC raised ₹30 billion from Masala bonds and thereby became the first Indian company to issue masala bonds.
- In August 2016, NTPC, a public sector undertaking, issued the first corporate green masala bonds worth ₹20 billion.

== See also ==
- Foreign currency denominated bond
- Eurobond
- Dim sum bond
- Samurai bond
- Uridashi bonds
