= Galfar Engineering and Contracting =

Construction company of Oman

Galfar Engineering and Contracting SAOG was founded by Dr. Salim Said Al Fannah Al Araimi, Sheikh Mohamed Rashid Al Fannah Al Araimi and Dr. P. Mohamed Ali. Galfar Engineering is known as one of the largest engineering, contracting and construction companies in the Sultanate of Oman. Its headquarters is situated in Ghala, Muscat, Sultanate of Oman. An article in The Economic Times claims it to be one of the top five engineering contractors across the Gulf. It was established in January 1972. It has a turnover of US$1 billion. Galfar employs over 23,000 workers, only in Oman, with more than 7,000 different kinds of plant and equipment.

== History ==
Galfar's oil and gas unit was set up in 1988. The company was listed on the Muscat Securities Market in October 2007, after an initial public offering in which investors offered about 11 times the US$156 million it sought to raise. In 2009 it registered a subsidiary in India. In 2010 the chairman, Sheikh Salim al-Araimi, held 17.9 per cent of the shares and the vice-chairman, Mohamed Ali, held 10 per cent; four corporate shareholders held 32.2 per cent and the public held the remaining 40 per cent. The company then had three business units (oil and gas; civils, utilities and services; roads and bridges), and Petroleum Development Oman had accounted for 80 per cent of its orders.

Hamoud Rashid Al-Tobi became chief executive in May 2020. In April 2024 a joint venture of Galfar and Trojan Construction Group of the UAE won the civil works package of the Hafeet Rail project, a 303-kilometre railway between Abu Dhabi and Sohar, valued at RO 521 million. In the first nine months of 2024 the parent company's revenue was RO 196.5 million, and its order book stood at RO 890 million at the end of September.
