= List of districts and cities in Kerala by GDP per capita =

This page lists Kerala cities by their nominal GDP per capita and financial good health.

Rank	City	District
1	Alappuzha (Alleppy)	Alappuzha
2	Kollam (Quilon)	Kollam
3	Kochi	Ernakulam
4	Thrissur (Trichur)	Thrissur
5	Kottayam	Kottayam

District-wise per capita (2018–19)

Rank	District	Per capita income in Rs.
1	Alappuzha	5,33,684
2	Kollam	4,17,690
3	Ernakulam	2,95,792
4	Kottayam	2,88,684
5	Thrissur	2,84,015
6	Idukki	2,70,612
7	Thiruvananthapuram	2,52,330
8	Kannur	2,49,536
9	Kozhikode	2,38,489
10	Kasaragod	2,20,918
11	Palakkad	2,28,687
12	Pathanamthitta	2,03,097
13	Wayanad	1,95,330
14	Malappuram	1,94,170
