= Malabar pepper =

Variety of black pepper

- Geographical indication
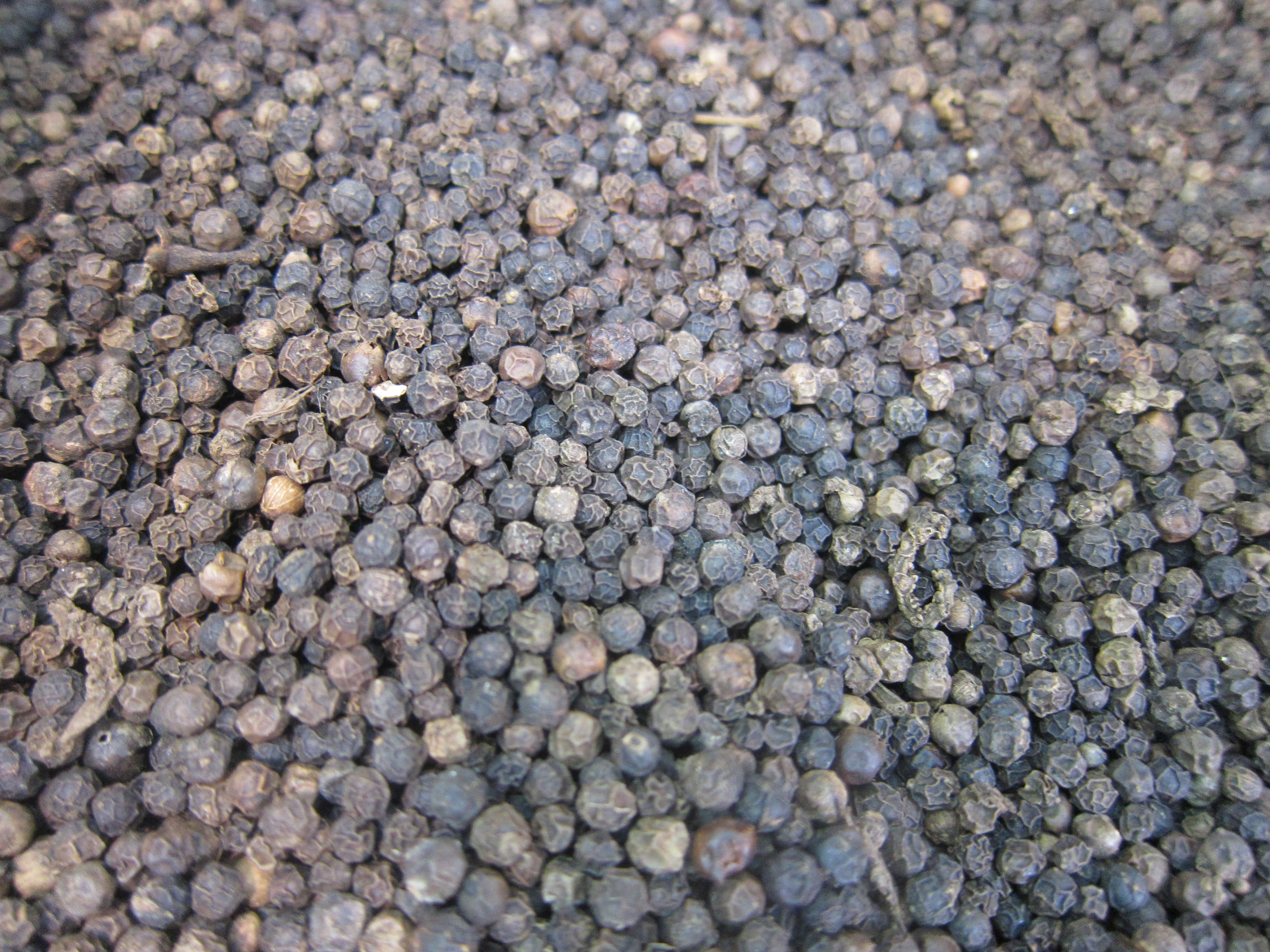
- Description: Black pepper grown in Malabar region
- Type: Agricultural
- Area: Malabar region in Kerala; Western Tamil Nadu
- Country: India
- Registered: 2007–08

Malabar pepper is a variety of black pepper from the Malabar region of the present day of the Indian state of Kerala. It originated as a chance seedling in the region and was one of the spices traded with Roman and Arab traders, and later with European navigators. The area of production of this variety of pepper spans across the Malabar Coast, Western Tamil Nadu and Southern Karnataka.

It was declared as a Geographical indication in 2007–08. The application for registration was made by Spices Board, Ministry of Commerce and Industry, Government of India.

== Description ==
The plant (Piper nigrum) is a flowering vine in the family Piperaceae, cultivated for its fruit, which is usually dried and used as a spice and seasoning. The fruit, known as a peppercorn when dried, is a small drupe five millimetres in diameter, dark red when fully mature, containing a single seed. Malabar pepper is classified under two grades known as garbled and un-garbled. The garbled variety is black in colour nearly globular with a wrinkled surface. The ungarbled variety has a wrinkled surface and the color varies from dark brown to black.
