= List of cities in Kerala by urban area growth =

Kerala is the second most urbanized state in India. 47.7% of the total population of Kerala is considered as urban population. It was just 25.9% a decade ago. The state consists of six city municipal corporations and 87 municipalities across its 14 districts. In January 2020, Economist Intelligence Unit (EIU) conducted a survey which found that three Kerala cities are among the world's ten fastest-growing urban areas. They are Malappuram (1), Kozhikode (Calicut) (4) and Kollam (Quilon) (10).

| Rank | City | World ranking | % of growth (2015-2020) |
|---|---|---|---|
| 1 | Malappuram | 1 | 44.1% |
| 2 | Kozhikode | 4 | 34.5% |
| 3 | Kollam (Quilon) | 10 | 31.1% |
| 4 | Thrissur (Trichur) | 13 | 30.2% |
| 5 | Thiruvananthapuram (Trivandrum) | 33 | 25.57% |
| 6 | Kochi | NA | 21.87% |
