= List of Indian states and union territories by poverty rate =

This is a list of states and union territories of India ranked according to poverty as of 2022 (2021–22) as hosted by NITI Aayog's Sustainable Development Goals dashboard; and Reserve Bank of India's 'Handbook of Statistics on Indian Economy'. The rank is calculated according to the percentage of people below poverty -line which is computed as per Tendulkar method on Mixed Reference Period (MRP).

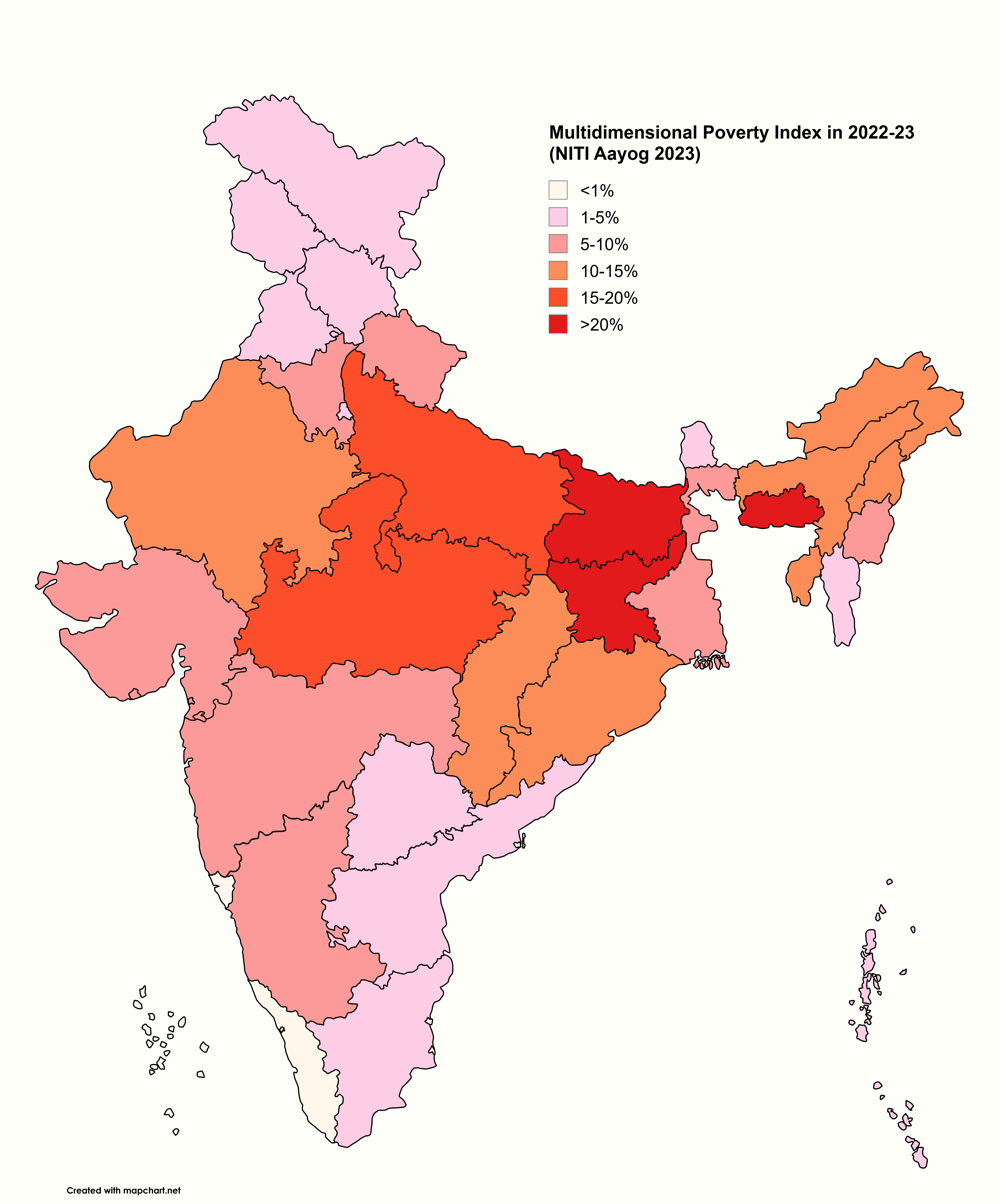
Percentage of population who are multidimensionally poor by State and Union Territory, data from the NITI Aayog (2023)

== List ==
| | State/UT | % of population State/UT specific poverty line (2019-21) | | % of population living below the Multidimensional Poverty Index in 2023 |
| | State/UT | Rural | Urban | % of population living below the Multidimensional Poverty Index in 2023 |
|---|---|---|---|---|
| | States | | | |
| 1 | Goa | 1.90 | 0.12 | 0.37 |
| 2 | Kerala | 0.76 | 0.32 | 0.48 |
| 3 | Tamil Nadu | 2.90 | 1.41 | 1.43 |
| 4 | Sikkim | 3.75 | 0.51 | 2.10 |
| 5 | Telangana | 7.51 | 2.73 | 3.76 |
| 6 | Mizoram | 10.77 | 0.58 | 3.77 |
| 7 | Himachal Pradesh | 5.23 | 2.96 | 3.88 |
| 8 | Andhra Pradesh | 7.71 | 2.20 | 4.19 |
| 9 | Punjab | 4.74 | 4.76 | 4.35 |
| 10 | Haryana | 8.41 | 4.26 | 5.30 |
| 11 | Manipur | 10.95 | 3.43 | 5.37 |
| 12 | Maharashtra | 11.49 | 3.07 | 5.48 |
| 13 | Karnataka | 10.33 | 3.22 | 5.67 |
| 14 | Uttarakhand | 10.84 | 7.00 | 6.92 |
| 15 | West Bengal | 32.15 | 18.04 | 8.60 |
| 16 | Gujarat | 17.15 | 3.81 | 9.03 |
| 17 | Arunachal Pradesh | 15.14 | 5.90 | 10.05 |
| 18 | Rajasthan | 23.62 | 10.54 | 10.77 |
| 19 | Odisha | 17.72 | 5.42 | 11.07 |
| | All India | 19.28 | 5.27 | 11.28 |
| 20 | Tripura | 16.47 | 4.69 | 11.49 |
| 21 | Chhattisgarh | 19.71 | 4.59 | 11.71 |
| 22 | Nagaland | 19.88 | 6.14 | 11.76 |
| 23 | Assam | 21.41 | 6.88 | 14.47 |
| 24 | Madhya Pradesh | 25.32 | 7.10 | 15.01 |
| 25 | Uttar Pradesh | 15.35 | 6.57 | 17.40 |
| 26 | Jharkhand | 34.93 | 8.67 | 23.34 |
| 27 | Meghalaya | 32.43 | 8.14 | 25.46 |
| 28 | Bihar | 56.95 | 29.67 | 26.59 |
| | Union Territories | | | |
| 1 | Puducherry | 0.71 | 0.91 | 0.58 |
| 2 | Lakshadweep | 0.36 | 1.32 | 0.84 |
| 3 | Andaman and Nicobar Islands | 2.71 | 1.60 | 1.63 |
| 4 | Ladakh | - | - | 1.73 |
| 5 | Chandigarh | 3.88 | 3.51 | 2.62 |
| 6 | Jammu and Kashmir | 6.10 | 1.09 | 2.81 |
| 7 | Delhi | 2.57 | 3.45 | 2.97 |
| 8 | Dadra and Nagar Haveli and Daman and Diu | 12.27 | 5.67 | 6.06 |

== Supporting content ==
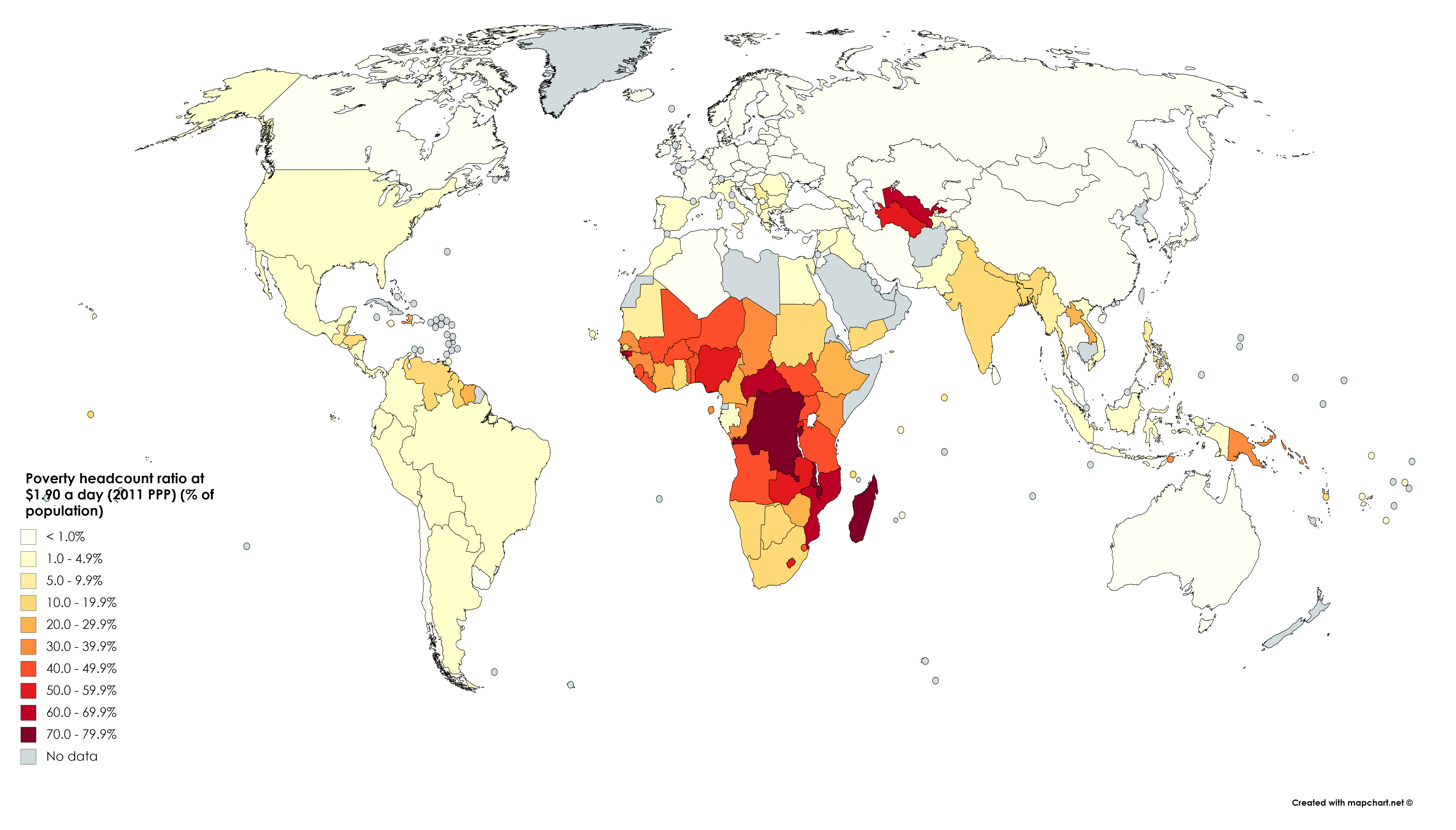
Poverty headcount ratio at $1.90 a day (2011 PPP) (% of population). Based on World Bank data ranging from 1998 to 2018.

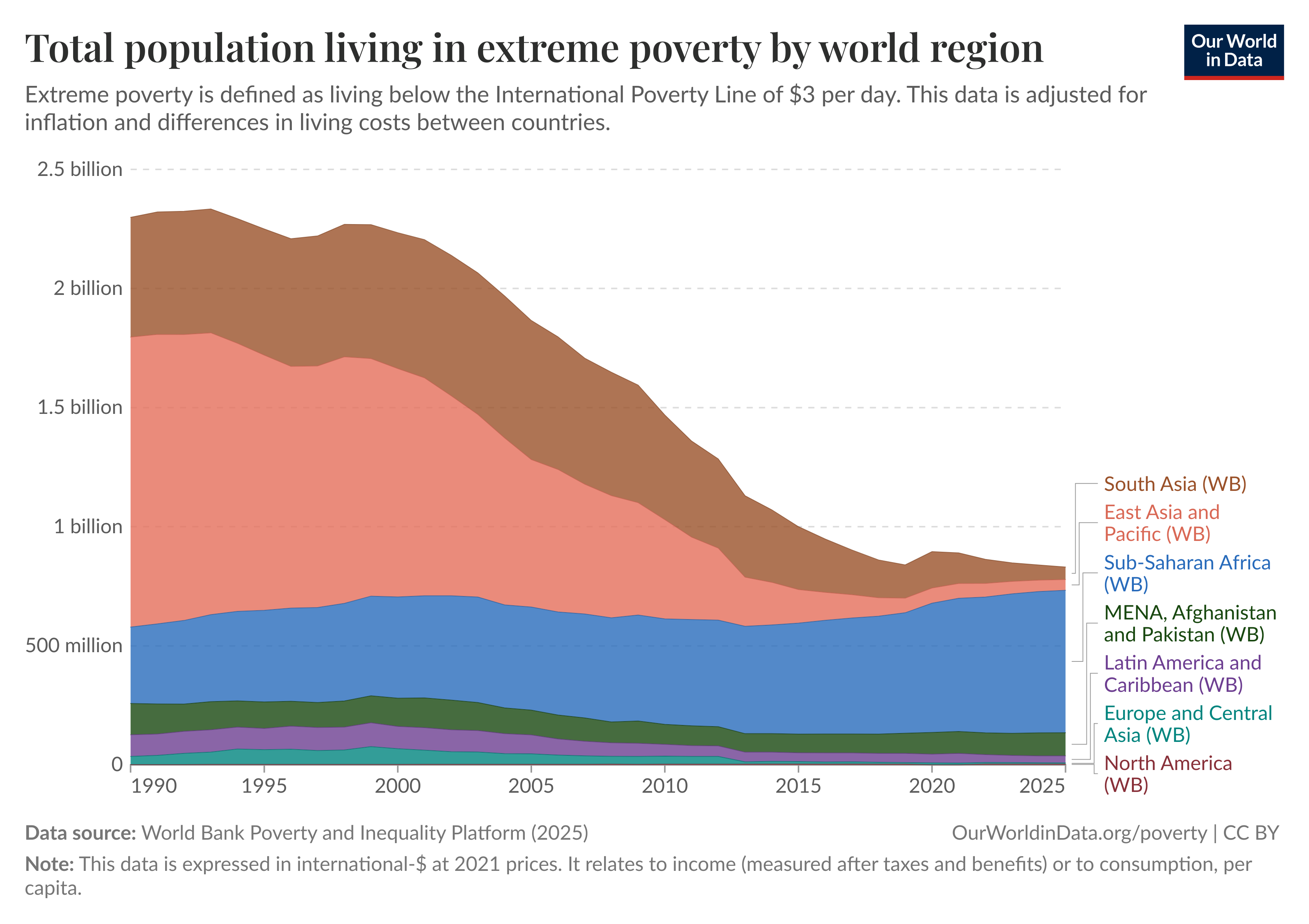
World population living in extreme poverty

Various poverty lines and resulting percentage of BPL population
| Method | Line | Figure | % of poor population | Poor population |
|---|---|---|---|---|
| World Bank (2021) | poverty line | 1.90 (PPP $ day) | 6 | 84m |
| World Bank (2021) | lower middle-income line | 3.20 (PPP $ day) | 26.2 | 365m |
| World Bank (2021) | upper middle-income line | 5.50 (PPP $ day) | 60.1 | 838m |
| Asian Development Bank (2014) | poverty line | $ 1.51 per person per day | | |
| Tendulkar Expert Group (2009) | urban poverty line | Rs 32 per person per day consumption | | |
| Tendulkar Expert Group (2009) | rural poverty line | Rs 26 per person per day consumption | | |
| Rangrajan Committee (2014) | urban poverty line | Rs 47 daily per capita expenditure | | |
| Rangrajan Committee (2014) | rural poverty line | Rs 32 daily per capita expenditure | | |
