= 2021 in Kerala =

- Centuries
- Decades: 2000s; 2010s; 2020s
- See also: List of years in Kerala; History of Kerala

Events in the year 2021 in Kerala.

== Incumbents ==
Photo	Post	Name
	The Governor of Kerala	Arif Mohammad Khan
	Chief minister of Kerala	Pinarayi Vijayan
	Chief Justice of Kerala High Court	S. Manikumar

== Events ==
=== January ===
5 January – A group of motorists attempted in unauthorized informally opening of flyover at Vyttila, Kochi.

22 January – Kerala Forest and Wildlife Department arrests five persons in Mankulam, Idukki for killing and eating a six year old Leopard.

28 January – Alappuzha Bypass on National Highway 66 inaugurated by Nitin Gadkari and Pinarayi Vijayan through video conferencing.

=== February ===
5 February – there were massive sarcastic online mob activity on the Facebook page of Nana Akufo-Addo, President of Ghana by Malayalis after a rumour spread in the state that P. V. Anvar, MLA Nilambur was held in a Ghana jail following Financial fraud.

11 February – the Additional District Sessions Court, Kottayam finds the prime accused in Vithura Rape case, Suresh alias Shamsudeen Muhammad Shajahan guilty after 25 years of trial.

14 February – through upgradation of District Hospital Mananthavady, Wayanad district gets its first Government Medical College Hospital and becomes the 14th and last district in Kerala to get a Government Medical College.

28 February – a 1987 batch Indian Administrative Service officer V.P. Joy is appointed as the Chief secretary, Government of Kerala.

=== March ===
7 March – The controversial four-lane Palarivattom Flyover at Kochi, which was rebuilt by Delhi Metro Rail Corporation and Uralungal Labour Contract Co-operative Society in a record time of 5 months and 10 days, was opened for traffic. This was the last official assignment of E. Sreedharan in Delhi Metro Rail Corporation.

11 March – the Member of the Legislative Assembly from Nilambur Assembly constituency, P. V. Anvar on whose name there were allegations in social media that, he was held in a Ghana jail, returned to Kerala from Sierra Leone. The MLA said that he was in the African country in connection with a mining project worth Rs. 20,000 crore.

16 March - Malabar gets its first MEMU with introduction of services between Kannur and Shoranur.

17 March – Bhim Army activists demolish a gate in Malankara Estate Thodupuzha claiming it as caste gate which denies right of way to dalit community living in the vicinity for almost two decades.

26 March - an alleged deposit fraud in bogus accounts to the tune of Rs.110 Crore detected in a raid by Income Tax Department on Abdu Rahman Nagar Service Cooperative bank, Tirurangadi, Malappuram district.

=== April ===
3 April – a case is reported as highway robbery in Kodakara, Thrissur district. The perpetrators of the crime is alleged to have links with state Bharatiya Janata Party leaders.

6 April – Kerala registers 74.06% voter turn out in the 2021 Kerala Legislative Assembly elections that happened as single phase in the state.

8 April – a communal and hate speech social media post by a lawyer named Adv. Krishna Raj, on a viral dance video clip by two students from Government Medical College, Thrissur named Janaki Omkumar and Navin Razak, kicks up row and massive support for the medicos as 'Rasputin Challenge' across the country.

12 April – The state Vigilance and Anti Corruption Bureau conducts raids on Indian Union Muslim League leader K. M. Shaji and seized cash worth rupees 50 lakhs from his residence.

13 April – Higher Education Minister, Government of Kerala, K. T. Jaleel submitted resignation after Lokayukta finds him guilty on charges of nepotism over a key appointment in the Kerala State Minorities Finance Development Corporation.

16 April – Kerala High Court quashes two cases filed by Kerala Police against Enforcement Directorate.

23 April – Thrissur Pooram conducted as rituals in a minimalistic manner following COVID-19 protocols.

27 April – Kerala High Court withholds appointment of wife of A. N. Shamseer as Asst. Professor in Kannur University.

=== May ===
2 May – in the 2021 Kerala Legislative Assembly elections, the incumbent Left Democratic Front won 99 seats out of 140 and comes back to power.

11 May – a woman from Idukki district named Soumya Santhosh, who was working in Ashkelon, Israel died due to a rocket strike by Hamas during a video call with her family.

15 May – a tropical Cyclone Tauktae causes heavy rains and damage across Kerala. Heavy coastal erosion along Thiruvananthapuram Taluk, Kollam district, Chellanam, Kasaragod district etc.

19 May – Almost 15 black fungus (Mucormycosis) cases reported in Kerala as a fallout of COVID-19.

20 May – Second Pinarayi Vijayan ministry takes oath in a function held at Central Stadium, Thiruvananthapuram.

22 May – V. D. Satheesan is chosen as the Leader of the Opposition in Kerala Legislative Assembly.

28 May – On a Public interest litigation moved by Justine Palluvathukkal, the Kerala High Court nullified the 80:20 ratio in distribution of minority scholarship schemes between Muslims and Latin Christians/converted Christians. The court declared that the three state government orders in this regard as unconstitutional and directed the state government to provide scholarships in accordance with the latest population of Minorities.

=== June ===
2 June – After years of legal battle at the Registrar of Trade Marks, Kerala State Road Transport Corporation has won the right to acronym KSRTC, which is also used by Karnataka State Road Transport Corporation.

8 June – opposition benches under United Democratic Front moved an adjournment motion in Kerala Legislative Assembly on Tree Felling Scheme amounting to Rs. 10 Crore, that had happened in Muttil village, Wayanad district in February 2021.

9 June – K. Sudhakaran takes charge as president of Kerala Pradesh Congress Committee.

13 June – TikTok celebrity Ambili aka Vighnesh Krishna arrested by Kerala Police for raping and impregnating minor girl at Vellikulangara, Thrissur district.

19 June –

- Controversial Naturopath Mohanan Vaidyar, who had taken stance against modern medicine died due to COVID-19 pandemic.
- Perumkulam is declared as first village of books in Kerala.

21 June – five youth from Cherpulassery got killed in a vehicle accident near Ramanattukara, Kozhikode in early morning hours which occurred due to duel between gold smuggling gangs from Kannur, Koduvally and, Cherpulassery. The gold of 2.3 kg over which the fight happened was intercepted by Customs at Calicut International Airport from a carrier.

22 June – a final year Bachelor of Ayurveda, Medicine and Surgery student named Vismaya, hailing from Nilamel found dead at her in-law's house at Sasthamkotta, Kollam district. It is alleged that the girl suffered harassment due to Dowry from her husband who is a state government employee.

25 June – Petrol prices cross Rs. 100/ litre mark at Parassala, Thiruvananthapuram district and Poopara, Idukki district.

27 June – Kerala State Excise Enforcement Squad busts a racket that was illegally diverting spirit from the imports of spirit to Travancore Sugars and Chemicals Limited, Thiruvalla which manufactures Jawan Rum.

28 June – a former Democratic Youth Federation of India worker from Azhikode was arrested by Customs (Preventive), Kochi in connection with gold smuggling through Calicut International Airport and Ramanattukara accident.

29 June

- alleging witch-hunt by state government, the chairman and MD of Kitex Garments and founder of Twenty20 Kizhakkambalam, Sabu M. Jacob announces that he is withdrawing from the Rs. 3500 Crore investment commitment made by his group in Kerala during Ascend Kerala Global Investors Meet, 2020.
- coastal shipping service connecting Cochin Port with Beypore port and Azhikkal flagged of in a virtual event by Mansukh L. Mandaviya, Union Minister of State for Ministry of Ports, Shipping and Waterways.

30 June –

- senior Indian Police Service officer, Anil Kant IPS from 1988 batch was appointed as Director general of police of Kerala.
- A six-year-old girl was raped and killed in Vandiperiyar allegedly by a Democratic Youth Federation of India worker.

=== July ===
4 July – cargo ship services started from Azhikkal port with 9 containers as part of coastal shipping between Cochin Port and North Malabar. On July 1 the cargo vessel Chowgule -8 called on Beypore with 40 containers.

5 July- In a major crowd-funding initiative, a whopping amount of ₹18 crore was collected in six days to purchase a medicine called Zolgensma for treatment of Mohammed, a one-and-a-half-year-old boy in Kannur, who had been affected with Spinal muscular atrophy.

6 July – a 22-year-old Democratic Youth Federation of India activist named Arjun from Vandiperiyar arrested in relation with brutal rape and murder of a 6-year-old girl that occurred on 30 June.

8 July -

- Zika virus outbreak detected in Thiruvananthapuram district.
- Cochin International Airport becomes the third busiest airport in the country in terms of international traffic during January–May 2021.

9 July – Ambergris worth 30 crore rupees that was held illegally was seized from Chetuva, Thrissur district.

11 July – The Kitex group head Sabu M. Jacob on his return to state from Telangana after making an investment commitment there announced that the group won't invest any more in Kerala.

14 July -

- The Governor of Kerala, Arif Mohammad Khan observes a day long fast to create social awareness against dowry and violence against women.
- The Bharatiya Janata Party, Kerala chief, K. Surendran was questioned by Kerala Police in connection with a Hawala case linked to highway robbery that took place in Kodakara, Thrissur district on April 3, 2021.

15 July – four labourers died due to suffocation in a newly dug well at Perumpuzha, Kollam district. A Kerala Fire And Rescue Services personnel who was in critical condition during rescue operation was hospitalised.

19 July – An alleged loan fraud to the tune of Rs. 100 Crore reported at Communist Party of India (Marxist) controlled Karuvannoor Service Cooperative bank, Irinjalakuda, Thrissur district.

20 July -

- a controversy erupted against Forest Minister A. K. Saseendran for his alleged involvement and coercion for settling a sexual harassment case against a Bar owner based in Kundara.
- Kerala's first Trans woman Radio personality and transgender activist, Anannya Kumari Alex who alleged medical negligence in her sex reassignment surgery conducted at Renai Medicity, was found dead in her apartment at Kochi.
- 25 July – Indian National League party splits following clash between workers at Kochi.

26 July – a circular issued by Joseph Kallarangatt the bishop of Syro-Malabar Catholic Eparchy of Pala announcing sops for large families invites criticism.

28 July – Supreme Court of India rejects Government of Kerala's appeal to withdraw cases against legislators involved in vandalism and ruckus of Kerala Legislative Assembly when the house was in budget session on 13 March 2015.

30 July – a 24 year old Dental degree student from Indira Gandhi Institute of Dental Sciences, Kothamangalam was shot dead by a stalker in a paying guest facility at Nellikuzhi.

31 July – Kuthiran Tunnel in National Highway 544 was opened in the evening following an announcement by Nitin Gadkari through Twitter.

=== August ===
5 Aug – P. R. Sreejesh, part of India men's national field hockey team won Olympic bronze medal in 2020 Summer Olympics, Tokyo. He became the second Malayali to win an olympic medal after Manuel Frederick who was part of hockey team of 1972 Summer Olympics.

6 Aug – Kerala High Court observes that marital rape is a ground for divorce.

9 Aug – a popular travel vloggers named E Bull Jet from Kannur was arrested by Kerala Police for creating ruckus in Motor vehicle department (MVD) office following MVD's decision to penalize vloggers for doing illegal modifications to their vehicle. The arrest of the Internet celebrities was followed by wide spread social media mob activity propagating threat and anger by youngsters.

17 Aug -

- former Director general of police, Lokanath Behera appointed as Chief executive officer of Kochi Metro.
- Indian Union Muslim League froze the women wing Haritha of Muslim Students Federation for speaking up on sexual harassment.

=== September ===
1 Sept – The jury of 29th Kerala State Television Award finds no Television serial worthy for the awards and announces no awards in the category.

4 Sept – Antony Raju, Minister of Transport, announces that Government of Kerala is exploring possibilities of opening Kerala State Beverages Corporation outlets in Kerala State Road Transport Corporation bus terminal complexes to raise extra revenue. Social media reacts to the plan with a flurry of Memes and Internet trolls.

5 Sept – a 12-year-old boy died in Kozhikode following Nipah virus infection.

8 Sept – the first batch of girl cadets takes admission to Sainik School, Kazhakootam. The batch comprises ten cadets selected from Kerala, Bihar and Uttar Pradesh. Prior to this only girls who were children of staff were allowed admission in the school.

9 Sept – the Bishop of Diocese of Pala Joseph Kallarangatt triggered a controversy in the state by making a remark that Christian girls are falling prey to Love Jihad and Narcotic Jihad.

10 Sept – controversy erupts in Kannur University over inclusion of works of Rashtriya Swayamsevak Sangh ideologue Vinayak Damodar Savarkar, Deendayal Upadhyaya and M. S. Golwalkar in the Master of Arts (Governance and Politics) curriculum.

26 Sept – a con-artist named Monson Mavunkal from Cherthala was arrested by Kerala Police for swindling crores of rupees by selling fake antique artifacts.

=== October ===
1 Oct – a 22-year-old girl, who was a graduation student at St. Thomas College, Palai murdered by her classmate within college premises after an examination.

7 Oct - Supreme Court of India upheld the National Green Tribunal decision that stipulates 200 metres as minimum distance between quarries and residential buildings.

10 Oct- Diesel fuel prices breaches INR 100 mark in Kerala at parts of Thiruvananthapuram district and Idukki district.

13 Oct – District Additional Sessions Court, Kollam which found the husband Sooraj guilty in the 'Uthra Murder Case', awarded double life sentence to the convict. The convict had murdered his wife Uthra by using a venomous snake.

14 Oct – Trivandrum International Airport is taken over by Adani Group from Airports Authority of India.

16 Oct – Heavy rains due to low pressure formed over Arabian Sea caused heavy rains in Southern Kerala along with landslides and flooding in Idukki district and Eastern parts of Kottayam district such as Mundakayam. The landslides killed at least 42 people and caused damages to numerous houses. Shutters of several dams in Kerala including Kakki dam, Malampuzha Dam, Thenmala Dam, Neyyar Dam were opened following the rains.

21 Oct – An All India Students Federation women leader alleges casteist abuse and sexual assault against her by Students' Federation of India members during clashes between AISF and SFI at Mahatma Gandhi University, Kerala during senate elections.

22 Oct – a 22-year-old mother from Peroorkada named Anupama, claims that her three-day-old new born, born out of wedlock was allegedly kidnapped by her father P S Jayachandran who is a Communist Party of India (Marxist) local committee member, and given for illegal adoption without consent. The mother of the kid, Anupama Chandran was a Students' Federation of India activist belonging to Ezhava community and the biological father of the kid Ajith Kumar is a Democratic Youth Federation of India activist and Dalit Christian.

30 Oct – Bineesh Kodiyeri, son of Communist Party of India (Marxist) leader Kodiyeri Balakrishnan who was jailed at Central Prison, Bangalore in October 2020 in connection with Prevention of Money Laundering Act violations and 2020 Bengaluru drug case released following bail order from Karnataka High Court.

=== November ===
5 Nov – The Mohanlal starrer Marakkar: Lion of the Arabian Sea is announced for OTT release. There was an ongoing tussle between Film producer Antony Perumbavoor and theatre owners due to producers decision to go with OTT release by violating pre-existing commitment for theatrical release that could not be honoured due to COVID-19 pandemic.

9 Nov – A video of an Islamic cleric performing Fatiha Jalana' ritual (blowing air into the first plate of food to make it holy before serving it to guests) surfaces in Twitter as cleric spitting into food to make it Halal. This sparked controversy that halal food served in Kerala is 'spit food and started a hate campaign in Social media. It was identified by Fact-checkers that the cleric in the video is Ullal Qazi Fazal Koyamma Thangal and the occasion was the 'Uroos' at the Tajul Ulama Dargah in Payyanur.

11 Nov – Kerala High Court quashes the appointment of wife of A. N. Shamseer as Asst. Professor in Kannur University.

15 Nov – A Rashtriya Swayamsevak Sangh worker hacked to death allegedly by workers of Social Democratic Party of India.

18 Nov – Travancore Devaswom board submits before Kerala High Court that the ongoing Social media campaign which alleges usage of Halal Jaggery in prasadam served at Sabarimala temple as baseless and malicious.

20 Nov – For a first time, the existing vice-chancellor of Kannur University, Prof. Gopinath Raveendran gets reappointment for a second term.

22 Nov – a 21-year-old student of law, Mofiya Parveen from Aluva commits suicide following domestic harassment from husband and insult from Police officer during conciliatory talks.

23 Nov – Genetic testing by Rajiv Gandhi Centre for Biotechnology confirms that Anupama Chandran and Ajith Kumar as biological parents of the baby boy in Peroorkada Adoption row.

26 Nov –

- Kerala got ranked as the state with the least Poverty in NITI Aayog's Multidimensional Poverty Index.
- Income Tax Department conducts raids on Malayalam cinema producers Antony Perumbavoor, Listin Stephen and Anto Joseph.

=== December ===
1 Dec – Kerala Police reveals that the death of two models in a car crash at Kochi was after a drug addict named Saiju Thankachan chased them from No. 18 Hotel Fort Kochi with intentions to attack them.

2 Dec – A Communist Party of India (Marxist) local secretary was killed by assailants in Thiruvalla.

6 Dec – A higher secondary student from Kollam district through his article written in Kerala Sasthra Sahithya Parishad publication, refutes Pseudoscientific claims and false information spread by Alexander Jacob IPS in a speech given to students.

8 Dec – Governor of Kerala Arif Mohammad Khan writes a letter to Chief minister of Kerala in which he conveys his dissent towards political interference in administration of Universities and Higher Education in Kerala.

15 Dec – Balussery Government Girls Higher Secondary School in Kozhikode district implemented a Gender neutral uniform for its students. Muslim organizations protested against this move.

16 Dec – E. Sreedharan announced that he is quitting active politics.

17 Dec – a 22-year-old girl named Krishnapriya was killed by stabbing and setting ablaze by a 30 year old RSS affiliated youth and stalker named Nandakumar at Thikkodi, Kozhikode district. The killer also died on the following day succumbing to burns.

18 Dec - An internal mail leaked from Kerala Medical Services Corp Ltd reveals massive corruptions and misappropriation that has taken place under the garb of emergency purchase in the organisation during COVID-19 pandemic in India.

19 Dec – Social Democratic Party of India state secretary and a Bharatiya Janata Party OBC Morcha leader were brutally murdered in a span of less than 12 hours by assailants in separate incidents in Alappuzha.

22 Dec – Kerala High Court orders Government of Kerala to pay Rs. 1.5 lakh as compensation to an 8-year-old girl who was humiliated by Pink Police at Attingal on August.

25 Dec – Violent clashes by migrant labourers at labour camp of Anna Kitex Group in Kizhakkambalam. Certain labourers attacked Kerala Police and torch the official vehicle.

== Deaths ==
=== January ===
3 - Anil Panachooran, poet and lyricist.

31 – C. V. Jacob, owner of Synthite Group.

=== March ===
5 – M. G. George Muthoot, entrepreneur.

=== April ===
5 – P. Balachandran, writer and actor.

=== May ===
3 – R. Balakrishna Pillai, 86, politician.

4 – Mela Reghu, 60, actor.

5 – Philipose Mar Chrysostom Mar Thoma, 103, patriarch of Mar Thoma Syrian Church.

10 – Dennis Joseph, 63, Screenwriter.

11 – K. R. Gouri Amma, 101, politician

- Madampu Kunjukuttan, 79, actor and elephant Ayurveda practitioner.

=== June ===
14 - Thaika Shuaib, 90, Arwi language proponent and scholar.

18 – S. Ramesan Nair, 73, lyricist.

=== July ===
10 – P. K. Warrier, 101, Ayurvedic practitioner.

12 – Paulose II, 74, primate of Malankara Orthodox Syrian Church.

16 – Perumpuzha Gopalakrishnan, 89, lyricist writer and CPI leader

22 – K. T. S. Padannayil, 88, actor

=== August ===
6 - P.S. Banerjee, 41, folk artist.

9 – Saranya Sasi, 35, actress.

19 – O. M. Nambiar, 89, athletic coach of P. T. Usha.

21 – Chithra (actress), 56.

27 – Noushad, 55, Chef and Film producer.

=== September ===
13 – Rizabawa, 54, actor.

16 – Poonthura Siraj, 57, Vice chairman of Peoples Democratic Party.

17 - Thanu Padmanabhan, 64, theoretical physicist.

=== October ===
11- Nedumudi Venu, 73, actor.

=== November ===
26 – Bichu Thirumala, 79, Lyricist

=== December ===
22 – P. T. Thomas, 70, Politician

== See also ==
- History of Kerala
- 2020 in Kerala
- 2021 in India
