= 2022 in Kerala =

- Centuries
- Decades: 2000s; 2010s; 2020s
- See also: List of years in Kerala; History of Kerala

Events in the year 2022 in Kerala.

== Incumbents ==
Photo	Post	Name
	The Governor of Kerala	Arif Mohammad Khan
	Chief minister of Kerala	Pinarayi Vijayan
	Chief Justice of Kerala High Court	S. Manikumar

== Events ==
=== January ===
- 6 January – A newborn kid was kidnapped from Government Medical College, Kottayam by a 33-year-old woman from Kalamassery named Neethu Raj for blackmailing her lover who has tortured and cheated her and her family.
- 8 January - Minister P. A. Mohammed Riyas inaugurates Edappal flyover on State Highway 69 by violating COVID-19 protocols.
- 9 January - Ex-Muslim of Kerala observes 9 January as ex-Muslim day, by conducting seminars on atheism and Islam.
- 10 January - a 21 year old engineering student and Students' Federation of India worker named Dheeraj was stabbed to death by Kerala Students Union activists in Government Engineering College, Idukki.
- 12 January - A mega Thiruvathira event with more than 500 artists conducted as part of Thiruvananthapuram District Congress meet of Communist Party of India (Marxist) at Parassala amidst SARS-CoV-2 Omicron variant spread in the state.
- 13 January - Ministry of Defence rejects Kerala's tableau for Republic Day parade for a third time in recent years sparking a row. This years tableau contained representations of Narayana Guru and Jatayu Earth's Center Nature Park.
- 14 January - Bishop Franco Mulakkal main accused in Nun Rape Case acquitted by Kottayam district Sessions Court.
- 19 January - Government of Kerala orders Idukki district collector to cancel the controversial title deeds issued in 7 villages of Devikulam taluk named '1999 Raveendran Pattayams'.
- 20 January - POCSCO case victim commits suicide in Kozhikode.
- 24 January -
  - A court in Thiruvananthapuram asks V. S. Achuthanandan to pay Rs. 10,10,000 to Oommen Chandy in a Defamation case filed by later in connection with 2013 Kerala solar panel scam.
  - Kerala High Court holds its first ever night hearing to take a call on MV Ocean Rose case.
- 26 January - North Malabar gets its first MEMU with the introduction of Kannur - Mangalore MEMU.
- 31 January -
  - Snake catcher, Vava Suresh severely poisoned by a cobra during a rescue attempt near Changanassery.
  - MediaOne TV suspends following non renewal of license by Ministry of Information and Broadcasting following lack of security clearance from Ministry of Home Affairs.

=== February ===
- 8 February - Kerala High Court bench under Justice Nagaresh upholds gag order on MediaOne TV.
- 9 February - Indian Army rescued a trekker who was trapped in a crevice in Kurumbachi hill, Malampuzha, Palakkad district for more than 45 hours.
- 17 February - Kerala cabinet approves Canal City Calicut Project along Conolly Canal for Rs. 1118 crore with Kerala Infrastructure Investment Fund Board as implementation agency.

=== March ===
- 15 March - Supreme Court of India stays the ban on telecast of MediaOne.
- 17 March - Land demarcation for Silver Line (K-Rail) project met with severe resistance at Changanassery, Kottayam district. There was police crackdown against protesters.
- 20 March - Kerala Blasters FC defeated through Penalty shoot-out by Hyderabad FC in the finals of Indian Super League held at Goa.

=== April ===
- 11 April - Pinarayi Vijayan flags of Swift bus service of Kerala State Road Transport Corporation at Thiruvananthapuram.
- 16 April - Two political killings occurred in Palakkad district within last 24 hours. Workers of Social Democratic Party of India and Rashtriya Swayamsevak Sangh were killed in two separate incidents alleged as retaliation.
- 22 April - A young actress filed sexual assault complaint against Vijay Babu at Ernakulam South police station.
- 27 April - MeToo accused actor Vijay Babu reveals the victims name in a Facebook live session to public.

=== May ===
- 1 May - Askar Ali (Hudavi), a 24 year old Ex-Muslim from Kerala who was also an imam at a mosque, who is presently a Rationalist and member of Essense club Freethought group faced murder attempts from Islamic fundamentalist at Kollam by a group from Malappuram following his Viral video speech against Islam in Kerala.
- 10 May - M.T. Abdulla Musaliyar a member of Samastha Kerala Jem-iyyathul Ulama drew criticism following his controversial remark that young girls should not be allowed in public stages in a function at Perinthalmanna.
- 16 May - A bridge under construction near Koolimadu, Kozhikode district collapsed.
- 19 May - Pinarayi Vijayan reopens erstwhile Public sector undertaking Hindustan Newsprint as a new Government of Kerala owned Public sector undertakings of Kerala government.
- 21 May - Controversy erupted over communal slogans raised by a 10 year old kid in Popular Front of India rally held in Alappuzha.
- 29 May -
  - Double-track railway service became fully operational in Ernakulam–Kottayam–Kayamkulam line.
  - a 15 year old girl from West Bengal who came to Kerala as Migrant labourer Gang raped by six native men at Poopara, Idukki district.

=== June ===
- 6 June - The limited edition Mahindra Thar that came as an offering to Guruvayur Temple reauctioned to a non-resident Keralite businessman based out of Angadipuram for Rs. 43 lakhs.
- 9 June - Electric locomotive service begins in Kollam – Punalur railway line.
- 12 June - Chief minister of Kerala dedicates Thavanur Central Prison, the fourth Central Prison in Kerala to the state.
- 13 June - Two Indian Youth Congress workers protest against Pinarayi Vijayan in an IndiGo flight from Kannur to Thiruvananthapuram. In an in-flight video that surfaced one of the protester is seen pushed down by E. P. Jayarajan in retaliation.
- 16 June - Third edition of Loka Kerala Sabha began at Thiruvananthapuram. Indian National Congress led opposition United Democratic Front boycotts the function and Chief minister of Kerala Pinarayi Vijayan skipped the inauguration citing medical reasons.
- 19 June - A four hour avoidable delay in conducting kidney transplantation surgery at Government Medical College, Thiruvananthapuram results in death of patient.
- 24 June - The office of Wayanad Lok Sabha MP Rahul Gandhi vandalised by Students' Federation of India during protest citing MP's inaction against 1 km buffer-zone rule pronounced by Supreme Court of India.

=== July ===
- 1 July -
  - Chief minister of Kerala launches MEDISEP a social security scheme that will provide health care for state government employees and pensioners.
  - An unknown motorist threw a low intensity explosive on A.K.G. Center, Thiruvananthapuram.
- 14 July - Kerala Fibre Optic Network, an initiative by Government of Kerala received Internet service provider license.
- 25 July - Railway Board informed Kerala High Court that no approval was given to the project from Government of India and all steps taken by Kerala Rail Development Corporation are premature.

=== August ===
- 15 August - Protests by fishermen and Latin Catholic Church erupts against Adani Group's Vizhinjam International Seaport.
- 28 August - M. V. Govindan is chosen as the State Secretary of Communist Party of India (Marxist) to fill the vacancy of Kodiyeri Balakrishnan.

=== September ===
- 6 September - M. B. Rajesh sworn in as minister in Second Vijayan ministry as a replacement to M. V. Govindan.
- 10 September - Bharat Jodo Yatra a 3570kms and five month long padayatra led by Rahul Gandhi enters Kerala at Thiruvananthapuram district.
- 12 September - A. N. Shamseer got elected as the 24th speaker of Kerala Legislative Assembly.
- 20 September - Kerala State Road Transport Corporation employees at Kattakada depot attacks a father and daughter who came to office for availing student travelling concession for the daughter.
- 22 September - National Investigation Agency conducts a raid on Popular Front of India leaders across the state on early hours arresting top 8 leaders and nearly twenty in total from the state.
- 23 September - Popular Front of India calls a dawn to dusk hartal in the state causing disruption and blockade in the state with wide scale violence and destruction of nearly 70 Kerala State Road Transport Corporation buses.
- 26 September- Several Muslim bodies demonstrated in Kozhikode in front of Providence Girls HSS school after a Class 11 girl was not allowed to wear a hijab; they including MYL, demanded that the government cancel the school’s affiliation. The protest turned violent injuring 5 policemen
- 27 September - Bombay High Court quashes rape case against Binoy Kodiyeri, son of Kodiyeri Balakrishnan following out of court settlement for an amount of Rs. 80 lakhs as alimony.
- 28 September - A teacher residing in Thiruvananthapuram files sexual assault complaint against Eldhose Kunnappilly, Member of the Legislative Assembly.

=== October ===
- 6 October - A road accident caused due to collision between a Tourist bus carrying students and Kerala State Road Transport Corporation bus in National Highway 544 near Vadakkencherry claims nine lives.
- 9 October - The auspicious temple pond crocodile Babiya of Ananthapura Lake Temple, Kasaragod district dead due to old age.
- 11 October - a Communist Party of India (Marxist) worker named Bhagaval Singh, his wife Laila from Elanthoor Pathanamthitta district and a history-sheeter and con from Perumbavoor named Shafi arrested for conducting double Human sacrifice.
- 14 October - A woman named Greeshma allegedly poisoned her boyfriend, Sharon Raj, by mixing poison in herbal medicine at her residence. The case is addressed as Parassala Kashayam Greeshma murder case.
- 21 October - Supreme Court of India cancels the appointment of Rajasree M.S., as vice-chancellor of APJ Abdul Kalam Technological University.
- 23 October - Governor of Kerala Arif Mohammad Khan demands resignation from Vice-chancellors of nine universities in state alleging flouting of norms laid out by University Grants Commission.
- 25 October - a 23 year old radiology student named Sharon Raj from Parassala killed by his lover Greeshma Nair by Poisoning.
- 26 October - Governor of Kerala Arif Mohammad Khan informs Chief minister of Kerala that "he cease to enjoy pleasure" in Finance Minister of Kerala K. N. Balagopal.
- 31 October - Government of Kerala raised retirement age in public sector enterprises to 60.

=== November ===
- 1 November - Government of Kerala announces first Kerala Awards, the highest civilian awards by the state and M. T. Vasudevan Nair awarded the first Kerala Jyothi award. The Kerala Prabha was announced to three persons and Kerala Sree to six eminent personalities.
- 3 November - A six year old kid gets brutally kicked and attacked by a car owner for touching his car in Thalassery.
- 7 November - Protests erupts outside Thiruvananthapuram Corporation against a controversial letter allegedly written by Mayor Arya Rajendran to Communist Party of India (Marxist) district secretary for making illegal backdoor appointments of party cadres to 295 posts in the civic body.
- 9 November - Kerala Legislative Assembly passes a resolution requesting Kerala Governor to promulgate an ordinance which effectively removes Governor as the sole Chancellor of all fourteen universities in Kerala.
- 17 November - Kerala High Court quashes appointment of Priya Varghese, wife of Communist Party of India (Marxist) leader K. K. Ragesh as associate professor in Kannur University. The court also made observation that this appointment had taken place by flouting all norms laid out by University Grants Commission.
- 30 November - The cabinet of Government of Kerala approves a bill which will bring a legislation that remove Governor of Kerala as sole Chancellor of all fourteen universities in the state of Kerala.

=== December ===
- 6 December - The 138 day long protests against Vizhinjam International Seaport led by Latin Catholics church and fishermen community called off.
- 8 December - Kerala Legislative Assembly unanimously passes bills which abolish Income tax on Agriculture and Land tax on Plantation sector.
- 22 December - Government of Kerala publishes the survey map of 1 km Buffer zone around Eco-Sensitive Zone in the state.

== Deaths ==
- February 22 - K. P. A. C. Lalitha, actress, 74.
- March 6 - Syed Hyderali Shihab Thangal, Indian Union Muslim League State President, 75.
- April 23 - John Paul (screenwriter), 71.
- April 24 - K. Sankaranarayanan, Former Governor of Maharashtra, 89.
- May 31 - KK, Playback singer, 53.
- June 22 - Ambika Rao, actress, 58
- July 15 - Pratap Pothen, actor, 69.
- September 25 - Aryadan Muhammed, politician, 87.
- October 1 - Kodiyeri Balakrishnan, Former Communist Party of India (Marxist) state secretary, 68.
- October 2 - Atlas Ramachandran, businessman, 60.
- October 18 - Scaria Zacharia, linguist and researcher.
- October 27 - Satheeshan Pacheni, politician, 54.
- December 3 - Kochu Preman, actor, 67.

== See also ==
- History of Kerala
- 2021 in Kerala
- 2022 in India
