= Jayashankar =

Jayashankar is an Indian given name and surname. It is formed from the Sanskrit words jaya (जय) 'victorious' and śaṃkara (शंकर) 'beneficent'. The latter word is a reference to Shiva (see Shankar). By the process of schwa syncope, jaya becomes jai in many modern Indian languages, resulting in the name also being spelled Jaishankar. People with these names include:

- Jaishankar Bhojak (1889–1975), Indian actor and director of Gujarati theatre
- Jaishankar Prasad (1889–1937), Indian writer prominent in modern Hindi literature
- Kothapalli Jayashankar (1934–2011), Telangana movement activist
- Jaishankar (1938–2000), Indian actor known for his work in Tamil cinema
- Thiruvizha Jayashankar (born 1940), Indian classical musician
- S. Jaishankar (born 1955), Indian diplomat
- Jaishankar Menon (born 1956), Indian-born American computer scientist
- A. Jayashankar (born 1962), Indian lawyer based in Kerala
- M. Jaishankar (1977–2018), Indian serial killer
- Shvetha Jaishankar (born 1978), Indian model and businesswoman
- Karuppannan Jaishankar, Indian criminologist
- Vedam Jaishankar, Indian cricket correspondent from Karnataka
