= 2020 in Kerala =

- Centuries
- Decades: 2000s; 2010s; 2020s
- See also: List of years in Kerala; History of Kerala

Events in the year 2020 in Kerala.

== Incumbents ==
The Governor of Kerala	Arif Mohammad Khan
Chief minister of Kerala	Pinarayi Vijayan
Chief Justice of Kerala High Court	S. Manikumar

== Events ==
=== January ===
- 11 January - two Apartment complexes namely H2O Holy Faith (Holy Faith Builders and Developers Pvt Ltd) and Alfa Serene (Alfa Ventures Private Ltd) based in Kochi were demolished following Maradu apartments demolition order by Supreme Court of India.
- 12 January - the last two among the four to be demolished apartments in Kochi namely Jains Coral Cove(Jain Housing and Construction Ltd) and Golden Kayaloram (KP Varkey & VS Builders) demolished following Maradu apartments demolition order by Supreme Court of India. These apartments were built by violating Coastal Regulation Zone rules.
- 26 January - 2020 Kerala human chain as part of Citizenship Amendment Act protests.

=== February ===
- 4 Feb - Government of Kerala declares Coronavirus infection a state calamity after the reporting of third case in the state from Kannur district.
- 13 Feb - A Wuhan returned COVID-19 patient from Government T D Medical College, Alappuzha becomes the first patient in India to recover from the illness fully.
- 28 Feb - Dead body of six-year-old girl Devananda, who went missing from Kollam district found in Ithikkara River near her home.

=== March ===
- 23 Mar - Kerala reports 30 new cases of COVID-19 and subsequently a lockdown announced in state till March 31 to contain the spread of virus.
- 28 Mar - First COVID-19 death recorded in Kerala. Yakub Hussain Sait, 69, died at the Government Medical College, Ernakulam.
- 29 Mar - Hundreds of migrant labourers stage protests in Payippad, Kottayam district defying COVID-19 lockdown.

=== April ===
- 21 April - A sixteen year old boy killed using axe by his school mates near Kodumon, Pathanamthitta district.

=== May ===
- 7 May - A twenty one year old Novitiate found killed at Baselian Convent of the Syro-Malankara Catholic Church at Thiruvalla.

=== July ===
- 5 July - 2020 Kerala gold smuggling case

=== August ===
- 6 August - 2020 Pettimudi landslide
- 19 August - Kerala's COVID-19 tally breaches 50,000 mark.
- 24 August - A Motion of no confidence moved against First Vijayan ministry defeated 87 - 40.
- 28 August - A multi crore Ponzi scheme scam to the tune if 2000 crores conducted by Popular Finance, Konni, Kerala detected by Kerala Police owners apprehended from Indira Gandhi International Airport.

=== September ===
- 19 September - National Investigation Agency arrests nine Al-Qaeda operatives from among Migrant labourers at Ernakulam district.

=== October ===
- 29 October - Bineesh Kodiyeri, son of Communist Party of India (Marxist) leader, Kodiyeri Balakrishnan was arrested by Enforcement Directorate in Bangalore in connection with 2020 Bengaluru drug raids.

=== November ===
- 14 November - Peoples Democratic Party vice chairman Poonthura Siraj quits PDP and joins Indian National League ahead of local elections. However the Left Democratic Front denied him ticket to contest in Thiruvananthapuram Corporation.

=== December ===
- 8 December - First phase of 2020 Kerala local elections.
- 16 December - LDF bags more than half of all gram panchayats, two-thirds of district panchayats and in four out of six municipal corporations in local elections.
- 25 December - Thenkurissi Honor killing.

== Deaths ==
=== April ===
- 7 April - Sasi Kalinga, 59, actor.
- 25 April - Ravi Vallathol, 67, actor.

=== May ===
- 18 May - M. P. Veerendra Kumar, 82, politician and writer.

=== July ===
- 30 July - Anil Murali, 56, actor.

=== October ===
- 15 Oct - Akkitham Achuthan Namboothiri, 94, Poet and Jnanpith Award winner.

=== December ===
- 12 Dec - U. A. Khader, 85, author.

== See also ==
- 2021 in Kerala
