= 2024 in Kerala =

- Centuries
- Decades: 2000s; 2010s; 2020s
- See also: List of years in Kerala; History of Kerala

Events in the year 2024 in Kerala.

== Incumbents ==
=== State government ===
Photo	Post	Name
	Governor of Kerala	Arif Mohammad Khan
	Chief minister Of Kerala	Pinarayi Vijayan
	Chief Justice of Kerala High Court	Nitin Madhukar Jamdar

== Events ==
=== January ===
- 3 January - Narendra Modi conducts roadshow in Thrissur, attended by more than two lakh women.
- 6 January - Enforcement Directorate issues summons to T. M. Thomas Isaac over investigation of Foreign Exchange Management Act violations in Kerala Infrastructure Investment Fund Board.
- 8 January - Kerala School Kalolsavam concludes its 62nd edition in Kollam with Kannur district emerging top in the tally.
- 9 January - Indian Youth Congress's state head Rahul Mamkoottathil arrested and jailed by Kerala Police for alleged violent protest against Nava Kerala Sadas and Second Vijayan ministry.
- 10 January -
  - National Investigation Agency arrests the absconding first accused of Prof. T. J. Joseph hand chopping case named Savad after 13 years from Mattanur.
  - Chief minister of Kerala inaugurates Phase 1 of Taurus Downtown Project in Thiruvananthapuram.
- 11 January - Jnanpith Award winner M. T. Vasudevan Nair criticizes 'ritualistic worship of political executive' in his keynote address of Kerala Literature Festival while Pinarayi Vijayan was on the dais.
- 20 January - Communist Party of India (Marxist) holds a 651 km long human chain in Kerala.
- 27 January - Arif Mohammad Khan, Governor of Kerala conducts way side dharna at Nilamel in protest of security breach and protest of Students' Federation of India on him.
- 30 January - Sessions Court Mavelikkara awards death sentence to 14 of the 15 convicted Popular Front of India activists who murdered Bharatiya Janata Party leader Ranjith Sreenivasan in Alappuzha.
- 31 January - Kerala Janapaksham (Secular) headed by P. C. George merges with Bharatiya Janata Party.

=== February ===
- 7 February - Kerala High Court did not allow a stay against the Serious Fraud Investigation Office investigation of Cochin Minerals and Rutile Limited, Kerala State Industrial Development Corporation and Veena Vijayan.
- 8 February - Kerala cabinet stages protest against Government of India in Jantar Mantar, New Delhi over anti federal stand of central government in allocation of fiscal resources.
- 10 February - Elephant attack in Manathavadi residence area caused death of 42 year old man.
- 12 February - An explosion in an illicit stockpile of Firecracker in Thrippunithura damages 270 houses and kills two people.
- 18 February - A student named Sidharthan is found hanging in his hostel room of Kerala Veterinary and Animal Sciences University and is alleged that he was killed and hanged by member of the Students Federation of India.
- 19 February - A pedophile from Varkala attempts to kidnap a two year old kid from Thiruvananthapuram in broad day light.
- 23 February - Communal tensions in Poonjar following alleged hooliganism by a group of Muslim students in a church premise.
- 27 February - Narendra Modi, Prime Minister of India visits Vikram Sarabhai Space Centre and announces names of four pilots who are undergoing Astronaut training for Gaganyaan.

=== March ===
- 1 March - For the first time in history of Kerala, nearly five lakh Government of Kerala employees did not receive their salary at the start of the month.
- 4 March - Non - Resident Keralite killed in Israel following a missile attack by Hezbollah.
- 19 March - Manjummel Boys becomes the first Malayalam cinema to cross Rs. 200 crore collection.
- 30 March - Sessions Court, Kasaragod acquits all suspects of 2017 Riyas Moulavi murder.

=== April ===
- 1 April -
  - Supreme Court of India refers Government of Kerala vs Government of India case over borrowing limits to Constitutional bench to test whether Federalism is contravened.
  - A senior nursing assistant who gave Testimony in favour of the survivor of ICU sexual assault case starts protest in Government Medical College, Kozhikode for unfair disciplinary proceedings against her.
- 2 April - Three tourists from Kerala found dead in a hotel in Ziro. The trio allegedly committed suicide in pursuit of Afterlife.
- 5 April - One person killed in a blast that occurred in an illegal country bomb manufacturing facility allegedly run by Communist Party of India (Marxist) workers in Panoor.
- 11 April - Kerala High Court dismissed the plea by M. Swaraj to invalidate K. Babu's election from Tripunithura in 2021 Kerala Legislative Assembly election.
- 12 April - Blood money of Rs. 34 crores raised through Crowdfunding from Malayalis for release of a Kozhikode native pravasi from death row in Saudi Arabia.
- 16 April - An SIT headed by Additional Principal Chief Conservator of Forest (Vigilance) recommends action against 18 forest officials for illegal felling of 126 trees in Sugandhagiri, Wayanad district.
- 19 April - Controversies erupts over excessive police high handedness and Ram Lalla motifs during Thrissur Pooram.
- 26 April -
  - Loksabha elections held in Kerala with 71.27% votes polled.
  - LDF convener E. P. Jayarajan makes revelation about meeting BJP leader Prakash Javadekar at Thrissur amidst public outcry over LDF-BJP deal.
- 27 April - Mayor Arya Rajendran and K. M. Sachin Dev MLA engage in Road rage with a Kerala State Road Transport Corporation bus driver and questions him for alleged unruly behaviour on the road.

=== May ===
- 21 May - A massive Fish kill happened along Periyar River in outskirts of Kochi allegedly caused by Pollution.
- 23 May - Bribery allegation arises against an alleged new Liquor Policy of Pinarayi Vijayan ministry that aims to relax existing prohibition norms.

=== June ===
- 4 June - 2024 general election results announced. United Democratic Front won 18 seats and Left Democratic Front and Bharatiya Janata Party won one seat each.
- 12 June - 24 Migrant workers from Kerala died due to building fire in Kuwait.

=== July ===
- 9 July - Allegations against a CPIM member in Kozhikode district for taking 22 lakhs as bribe offering Kerala Public Service Commission membership.
- 12 July - The first Mother ship docks at Vizhinjam International Seaport Thiruvananthapuram.
- 13 July - Christopher Joy, a 47-year-old temporary cleaning worker, had gone missing on Saturday while cleaning a waste-filled part of the Amayizhanchan stream under a 200-metre-long canal tunnel which runs under the tracks at the railway station in Thampanoor near the Central Railway Station. Navy, Fire force personnel, scuba teams of Kerala Fire and Rescue Services, police, civic workers and National Disaster Response Force men worked on the rescue operation and after nearly 48 hours his dead body was found on 15 July 2024.
- 16 July
  - Reports emerged in Friday that a Malayali lorry driver from Kozhikode named Arjun went missing. It is said that he and his lorry got trapped under a 2024 Ankola (Karnataka) landslide occurred at Ankola in Uttara Kannada District on Tuesday. Delay in rescue operation conducted by Karnataka garnered significant media attention in Kerala and the family of Arjun later alleged the same, which led to Ministerial intervention from the side of Kerala Government and other elected representatives.
  - Nearly a month after a building fire claimed the lives of 24 Malayalis in Kuwait a Malayali family of four killed in Kuwait City following suffocation due to the fire, which broke out in apartment after they had returned from a vacation in Kerala earlier that day. The family hailed from Neerattupuram in Kerala's Alappuzha district.
- 20 July - A case of Nipah virus was reported in Malappuram. The confirmed case of Nipah virus infection, a 14 year old teenager boy died due to heart attack on 21 July 2024. In the years 2018, 2021 and 2023, Nipah outbreak was reported in Kozhikode district and in 2019 in Ernakulam district.
- 23 July - Students at Government Girls Vocational Higher Secondary School in BP Angadi, Malappuram district, staged a protest on the street by blocking road at BP Angadi to highlight the school's dire condition in what they called the "perennial neglect of the authorities". Girls said they endured unsafe classrooms, dirty bathrooms, and the added ordeal of worms falling from the ceiling. Education Minister intervened, promising ₹3.9 crore (US$400,000) for infrastructure improvement and immediate action to address hygiene issues.
- 28 July - Female students at Muvattupuzha Nirmala College were questioned for conducting Friday prayers(Jumah) in the girls' resting room. College Principal Fr. Justine Kannadan, citing its secular policy, denied the request, offering instead to allow students to visit a nearby Mosque by providing relaxation on attendance. The issue prompted a protest in front of principal's office from various student organizations demanding a dedicated space to perform Namaz everyday afternoon within the campus, and according to the student's faction an amicable resolution reached allowing students to visit the Mosque for Friday prayers.
- 30 July
  - 2024 Wayanad landslides – At least 231 people are killed, 397 injured and 118 missing following landslides in Wayanad district, Kerala. It is considered as one of the worst natural disaster in Kerala after 2018 floods.
  - 2024 Vilangad (Kozhikode) landslide occurred in Vilangad village of Kozhikode district. A total of 200 people of 13 families miraculously escaped as they heard boulders rolling in early Tuesday. Along with the collapse of Malayangad bridge in the process, it altogether displaced some 800 plus people to nearby Parish hall, St. George HSS and Paloor LP school. The only casualty, Mathew, a retired teacher, went missing as he was in the work of alerting and ushering locals to safety whose body was recovered on August 1. Multiple landslips in Vilangad and nearby villages have completely destroyed 18 houses and damaged over 60 more, excluding the shops in the town which were shattered.

=== August ===
- 1 August - Due to the landslides in Wayanad, organizers have postponed the 70th Nehru Trophy boat race, originally scheduled for August 10 on Punnamada Lake. The event is now set for September 7.
- 4 August - Supreme Court has decided to revisit a 2014 case concerning the Mullaperiyar dam. The court will determine on Kerala's argument, though previously dismissed can be re-examined under exceptions to res judicata. Additionally, it will consider whether the Government of India, rather than Tamil Nadu, is the rightful successor to the lease, and if the 1886 agreement is protected by the Section 108 of the State Reorganisation Act. The court will also assess Kerala's alleged interference with Tamil Nadu's rights under the lease and a 1970 supplementary agreement.
- 6 August - University Appellate Tribunal court has ordered the arrest of Vellapalli Natesan, the manager of Kollam Nedunganda SN Training College, and to produce him before the court, in the case of violating the court order. The court also ordered him to pay compensation of five lakh rupees within four weeks for the mental difficulties caused by him to the petitioner.
- 19 August - Justice Hema Committee report, commissioned by the government in 2019 to investigate the challenges faced by women in the Malayalam film industry, was released after a prolonged legal struggle. The report, which had been withheld by the state government for four and a half years, was eventually made public under the Right to Information (RTI) Act. It provides a detailed account of the pervasive sexual harassment and exploitation experienced by women in the industry. Report have raised significant concerns about the safety and well-being of female professionals in Malayalam cinema.
- 25 August - In the light of releasing Hema committee report, allegations of sexual assault by actor Siddique on female junior artist, and allegations of misbehaviour by director Ranjith on Bengali actress Sreelekha Mitra followed, both Siddique and Ranjith quit their posts, general secretaryship of AMMA and headship of Kerala Chalachitra academy, respectively.

=== September ===
- 1 September - P. V. Anvar raised allegations against ADGP (L&O) M.R. Ajith Kumar, former Malappuram SP, Political Secretary P. Sasi for nexus with gold smuggling, Hawala etc. and CPI(M)-BJP deal in Thrissur Pooram fiasco.
- 26 September - Kerala Police issued look out notice against Siddique (actor) on count of rape following his rejection of anticipatory bail by court.
- 30 September - Controversy erupted following remarks made by Pinarayi Vijayan in his interview that got published in The Hindu that Non-state actors have nexus with Hawala, Gold Smuggling crimes taking place in Malappuram district.

=== October ===
- 2 October - CM's Press secretary alleges that it was PR agency Kaizzen which included controversial remarks which portray Malappuram district as a den of Anti-national activities.
- 13 - Protests by Syro-Malabar Church against Waqf Board move to claim right over 404 acres of land and homes of 601 families in fishing village of Munambam.
- 15 October - ADM Kannur, Naveen Babu found dead in quarters following insult by P.P. Divya, CPI(M) leader and Zilla Panchayat president.
- 17 October - Indian National Congress digital media convener Dr. P. Sarin leaves party and joins Left Democratic Front ahead of Palakkad bypolls.
- 22 October - Kerala becomes the first state to have integrated digital Land registration system and Ujar Ulivar in Manjeshwaram taluk becomes first village in country to complete digital land survey.
- 25 October - Antony Raju MLA raised allegation that Thomas K. Thomas MLA offered bribe of Rs. 100 crores to him and Kovoor Kunjumon MLA of Left Democratic Front for defecting to NCP (Ajit Pawar) an NDA ally.
- 29 October - A fire accident during Fireworks at a temple in Nileshwaram in midst of Theyyam leaves more than 100 injured and killed four.

=== November ===
- 2 November - Four sanitation workers of Indian Railways got killed after they were hit by Kerala Express while working on Bharathappuzha bridge near Shoranur.
- 5 November - Kerala Police carries out a politically motivated search over false allegations on a hotel room in Palakkad where Indian National Congress were staying for bypoll campaign.
- 11 November -
  - Two Indian Administrative Service officers, got suspended over misconduct on same day. Prasanth Nair got suspended for accusing higher authority through social media and K. Goapalakrishnan got suspended for starting WhatsApp groups on the basis of religion.
  - Violent clash between students and Kerala Police during closing ceremony of Kerala School Sports Meet.
- 16 November -
  - Bharatiya Janata Party leader Sandeep Varier joins Indian National Congress.
  - Communist Party of India (Marxist) capture rule of Chevayoor Cooperative Bank by force, defectors and undemocratic means from Congress.
- 23 November - The seats are retained by respected parties in bypoll results of Palakkad, Chelakkara and Wayanad.
- 28 November - Cochin International Airport makes its maiden pet import through Animal Quarantine Certification Service.

=== December ===
- 3 December - 5 Medical Students Killed As Their Car Collides With (KSRTC) passenger bus in Alappuzha
- 12 December - 4 schoolgirls ( Irfana Sherin, Ritha Fathima, Nitha Fathima, and Ayisha) killed after truck falls on them in Palakkad. The deceased students were studying at Govt Higher Secondary School, Karimba, Palakkad
- 28 December - CBI Special court convicts fourteen Communist Party of India (Marxist) workers for murder of two Youth Congress workers at Periya, Kasaragod on 2019.
- 29 December - Uma Thomas Thrikkakara MLA critically injured after falling of from 15 feet height in Jawaharlal Nehru Stadium (Kochi) due to unscientific stage constructed for a program.

=== Dates unknown ===
- Kerala Maritime Board announces plans for Passenger ship service between Kerala and United Arab Emirates.

== Deaths ==
=== January - June ===
- January 14 - T. H. Musthafa, former minister, 82.
- January 15 - K. J. Joy, music director, 77.
- February 18 -Sidharthan, - Kerala Veterinary University student, 21.

=== June ===
- June 12–23 Migrant workers from Kerala died due to a building fire in Kuwait.

=== August ===
- August 11 - K. Kutty Ahammed Kutty, Indian Union Muslim League (IUML) leader and former Minister for Local Administration for Kerala Government, 71.
- August 23 - Nirmal Benny, actor, remembered for his iconic role as 'Kochchan' in Amen.

=== September ===
- September 20 - Kaviyoor Ponnamma, Indian actress (Kalippattam, Nandanam, Kudumbasametham), 79.
- September 21 - M. M. Lawrence, Indian politician, MP (1980–1984), 95.

=== October ===
- October 3 - Mohan Raj, actor, aged 70, remembered for his villainous role as 'Keerikadan Jose' in the film Kireedam.
- October 9 - T. P. Madhavan, actor, aged 88, nephew of dramatist T. N. Gopinathan Nair and the grandson of linguist P. K. Narayana Pillai.
- October 30 - Nishadh Yusuf, film editor and writer, aged 44, known for his work on films such as Thallumaala, Petta Rap, Unda and Kanguva.

=== November ===
- November 12 - M. T. Padma, politician, aged 81, served as a Member of the Legislative Assembly (MLA) in Kerala from 1987 to 1991.
- November 21 - Meghanathan, aged 60, known for his work on films such as Athirathram, New Delhi, Oru CBI Diary Kurippu, and Chenkol.

=== December ===
- December 19 - Meena Ganesh, actress, aged 81, known for her work on films such as Nandanam, Vasanthiyum Lakshmiyum Pinne Njaanum, and Meesa Madhavan.
- December 25 - M. T. Vasudevan Nair, novelist, screenplay writer and a recipient of Padma Bhushan, aged 91, known for her work on films such as Oru Vadakkan Veeragatha, Kadavu, and Sadayam.

== See also ==
- 2024 in India
- 2024 Indian general election in Kerala
- Great flood of 99
- History of Kerala
