= M. Jaishankar =

Indian serial killer (1977-2018)

- Born: 1977; Kanniyanpatti, Tamil Nadu, India
- Died: 27 February 2018 (aged 40–41); Bangalore, Karnataka, India
- Cause of death: Suicide
- Other name: "Psycho Shankar"
- Status: Deceased
- Convictions: Murder, rape
- Penalty: Life imprisonment

Details
- Victims: 19+
- Span of crimes: 2008–2011
- Country: India
- States: Tamil Nadu, Karnataka
- Date apprehended: September 2009
- Imprisoned at: Bangalore Central Jail

M. Jaishankar (1977 – 27 February 2018), nicknamed Psycho Shankar, was an Indian criminal, sexual predator, and serial killer, notorious for a series of rapes and murders during 2008–2011. It is believed that he was involved in about 30 rapes, murders, and robbery cases across Tamil Nadu, Karnataka and Andhra Pradesh. At the time of his death, he had been accused of murdering at least 19 women.

Having been apprehended by Indian authorities, Jaishankar was imprisoned in Bangalore, where he was diagnosed as mentally ill. He killed himself following an unsuccessful prison escape attempt in February 2018. He was the subject of a 2017 Kannada movie, "Psycho Shankara", focussing on his victims and their family members during his murder spree.

== Early life ==
Jaishankar, a son of Maarimuttu, came from Kanniyanpatti village of Salem district, Tamil Nadu. In May 2011, he was reported to be a married man with three daughters. He started his career as a truck driver.

== Criminal history ==
Jaishankar started his criminal activities around 2008. His first crime to be reported happened on 3 July 2009, when he attempted to rape and murder 45-year-old P. Shyamala in Perandahalli. By August 2009, he had raped and murdered 12 women, and raped another six women. He always carried a black handbag with him. He kept a machete in this bag, and killed whomever resisted him. He used to kidnap sex workers near dhabas (roadside restaurants) on highways, rape them and kill them brutally. He also targeted women in farmhouses, in rural areas.

=== First arrest (2009) ===
On 23 August 2009, Jaishankar raped and murdered a 39-year-old police constable, M. Jayamani. Originally stationed at the Kangeyam all-women police station, Jayamani was on temporary duty at Perumanallur, during the visit of deputy chief minister M. K. Stalin. Jaishankar kidnapped her and raped her several times before killing her. The police recovered Jayamani's body a month later, on 19 September.

Jaishankar and his partner in crime P Mohan Selvam were charged with the murder of 50-year-old K. Thangammal Ponnaya in Namakkal on 10 September 2009. (Later, in 2014, the two were acquitted in this case, due to insufficient evidence resulting from lapses in investigation.)

The Tiruppur police launched a manhunt for Jaishankar and arrested him on 19 October 2009. He was jailed at the Coimbatore Central Prison. By this time, he had been charged with 13 separate counts of rape and murder in Tiruppur, Salem and Dharmapuri. He revealed, while remanded in custody, that he enjoyed torturing women before he raped and killed them.

==== First escape (2011) ====
On 17 March 2011, the police took Jaishankar to a fast-track court in Dharmapuri, for a murder case trial. The next day, armed reserve police constables M. Chinnasamy and Rajavelu were assigned to escort him back to Coimbatore. On the way, Jaishankar managed to escape at the Salem bus stand, around 9:30 p.m. On 19 March, Chinnasamy died by suicide after shooting himself, apparently upset at the escape.

=== 2011 murder spree in Bellary ===
Jaishankar escaped to Karnataka, where he raped and murdered six women in Bellary over the next month. He also killed a man and a child in Dharmapuri. In the last week of April 2011, the police traced his mobile phone to Delhi. The police initially believed that he had discarded his mobile phone in Delhi. However, in May 2011, the police traced his mobile calls to Mumbai, but he stopped using his mobile phone. A special team, comprising two sub-inspectors and 15 other police personnel, was assigned to find and arrest him.

=== Second arrest (2011) ===
By May 2011, the police had put up wanted posters seeking information about Jaishankar, in public places across Karnataka and Tamil Nadu. On the night of 4 May 2011, Jaishankar reached Elagi village in Karnataka, on a stolen motorcycle. He approached a woman, Chandrakala Hotagi, who was working alone in a field, and asked her for water and food. He then tried to rape her, but Chandrakala raised the alarm. Her husband, Prakash Hotagi, and a friend came to her rescue. Jaishankar tried to flee, but was caught by Prakash and other villagers. The locals brought him to the Zalaki police station. He was handed over to the Chitradurga police on 5 May 2011.

==== Second escape (2013) ====
After his 2011 arrest, Jaishankar was kept at the Parappana Agrahara Central Jail in Bangalore. He was sentenced to 27 years in prison. At the Bangalore jail, he underwent treatment for psychiatric problems. On 31 August 2013, the police took Jaishankar to the court in Tumkur near Bangalore. After returning, Jaishankar feigned uneasiness and was admitted to the hospital within the prison premises. He managed to secure a duplicate key and used it at 2 a.m. on 1 September 2013, when the daily change of guards took place. The police suspected that an insider helped him get the duplicate key. He scaled a 20-foot (6.1 m) wall, then walked atop a 15-foot (4.6 m) wall and finally scaled the 30-foot (9.1 m) high compound wall. He managed to cross the electric fence safely since it was not functional that night. He reportedly carried with him a bamboo pole balancing on the walls and a bedsheet to serve as a cushion over the glass pieces on the wall top. He was injured during the escape, and drops of blood were found outside the outer wall. He was reportedly wearing a police uniform during his escape. 11 jail staff, including three wardens, two jailors and six security guards, were suspended following his escape to reprimand them for allowing the escape.

The police issued a red alert to all police stations in Karnataka and urged women to be careful in isolated places. They announced a reward of ₹ 500,000 for any information leading to his arrest. They also analyzed his psychology and life history to predict his next actions. Besides this, the police printed 10,000 wanted posters and 75,000 pamphlets with different photographic profiles of Jaishankar, in five languages — Hindi, Kannada, Marathi, Tamil, and Telugu. Besides Karnataka, these posters and pamphlets were distributed across Tamil Nadu, Andhra Pradesh, Kerala and Maharashtra.

=== Third arrest (2013) ===
During his escape, Jaishankar fractured his leg while jumping from the 30-foot (9.1 m) high wall of the prison compound. He did not contact his family in Tamil Nadu. Soon after his escape, a police informant managed to get in touch with him. The informant lured him to a dilapidated building near the Kudlu gate in Bangalore, with the promise of a motorbike to facilitate his escape outside the city. There, the police arrested Jaishankar, at noon on 6 September 2013. The Government spent over ₹ 75,000 treating his fractured leg at the Victoria Hospital, where he was operated on, on 23 September.

The surgery on his leg having been completed, Jaishankar was sent to Central Prison, Bangalore to begin serving his sentence. He was kept in a high-security cell, with 24/7 CCTV monitoring and extra lights. The lock of his cell was designed to be out of his reach. It was decided that in case of an illness, he would be treated inside his cell, instead of being taken to a hospital. The police also decided to deploy extra security while escorting him to trials to minimize the likelihood of an escape.

== Death ==
On 25 February 2018, Jaishankar unsuccessfully tried to effect another escape from the Bangalore Central Prison. After this plot failed, he was held in solitary confinement.

Subsequently, on 27 February, he killed himself by slitting his own throat with a shaving blade, which he had acquired from a barber the day before. The jail staff found him lying in a pool of blood at around 2:30 a.m., during their daily rounds, and provided him first aid. He was later moved to Victoria Hospital, where he was declared dead at 5:10 a.m.

== See also ==
- List of serial killers by country
- List of serial killers by number of victims
