= Shankar (name) =

Shankar is an Indian name. It is also the name of Hindu god, Shiva. It is a Majhi word meaning "beneficent" or "giver of bliss".

The South Indian version of Shankar is sometimes written as "Matri".

Notable people with this name include:

== Given name ==
- Sankar (writer) (Mani Shankar Mukherjee), Bengali writer
- Shankar Balasubramanian, British chemical biologist
- Shankar Bhattacharyya (born 1946), American engineer
- Shankar Ghosh (musician) (1935–2016), Indian musician
- Shankar Lamichhane, Nepalese essayist
- Shankar Mahadevan, singer and part of the Shankar-Ehsaan-Loy music-director trio
- Shankar Nagar, Nepalese town
- Shankar Painter (1946–2020), Indian poet
- Shankar (actor) (Shankar Panikkar, born 1960), Indian film actor and director popularly known as Shankar
- K. Shankar Pillai (1902–1989), Indian cartoonist
- Shankar Dayal Sharma (1918–1999), ninth President of India serving from 1992 to 1997
- Shankar Tucker, American clarinetist and music composer
- Shankar Vedantam, reporter with NPR and host of 'Hidden Brain' podcast
- Shankar Nag, Indian Kannada film actor

== Surname ==
- Shankar (Tamil militant) (Colonel Shankar, nom de guerre), Vaithilingam Sornalingam of the Liberation Tigers of Tamil Eelam
- Adi Shankar, Indian-American writer, producer and director
- Adrian Shankar, English cricketer
- Amala Shankar (1919–2020), Indian dancer
- Anand Shankar, Tamil film director and writer
- Ananda Shankar (1942–1999), Bengali musician best known for fusing Western and Eastern musical styles. He was married to Tanusree Shankar
- Anoushka Shankar (born 1981), Indian sitar player and composer in the United States, daughter of Ravi Shankar
- Dileep Shankar (1970–2024), Indian actor, director and writer
- Juloori Gouri Shankar, Indian Telugu-language writer
- K. Shankar, Tamil film director
- K. S. Bhavani Shankar, Indian Mridangam player and musician
- L. Shankar (born 1950), Indian violinist
- Mamata Shankar (born 1955), actress in the Bengali language film industry of India
- Mani Shankar, Indian film-maker
- Melinda Shankar (born 1992), Canadian actress
- N. Shankar, Telugu film director
- Naren Shankar, writer, producer and director of several television series
- Geethali Norah Jones Shankar (Norah Jones, born 1979), American singer-songwriter, daughter of Ravi Shankar
- Ramamurti Shankar, physicist
- Ramsewak Shankar (1937), President of Suriname
- Ravi Shankar (1920–2012), famous sitar player
- Ravi Shankar (spiritual leader) (born 1956), guru and founder of the Art of Living movement
- Ravi Shankar (poet) (born 1975), poet and faculty member of Central Connecticut State University
- Rekha Shankar (born 1990), American comedian
- S. Shankar, Tamil film director
- Uday Shankar (1900–1977), classical dancer

== Fictional ==
- Shankar Roy Chowdhury, protagonist of the Chander Pahar franchise
