= Scaria Zacharia =

Indian linguist, professor and researcher

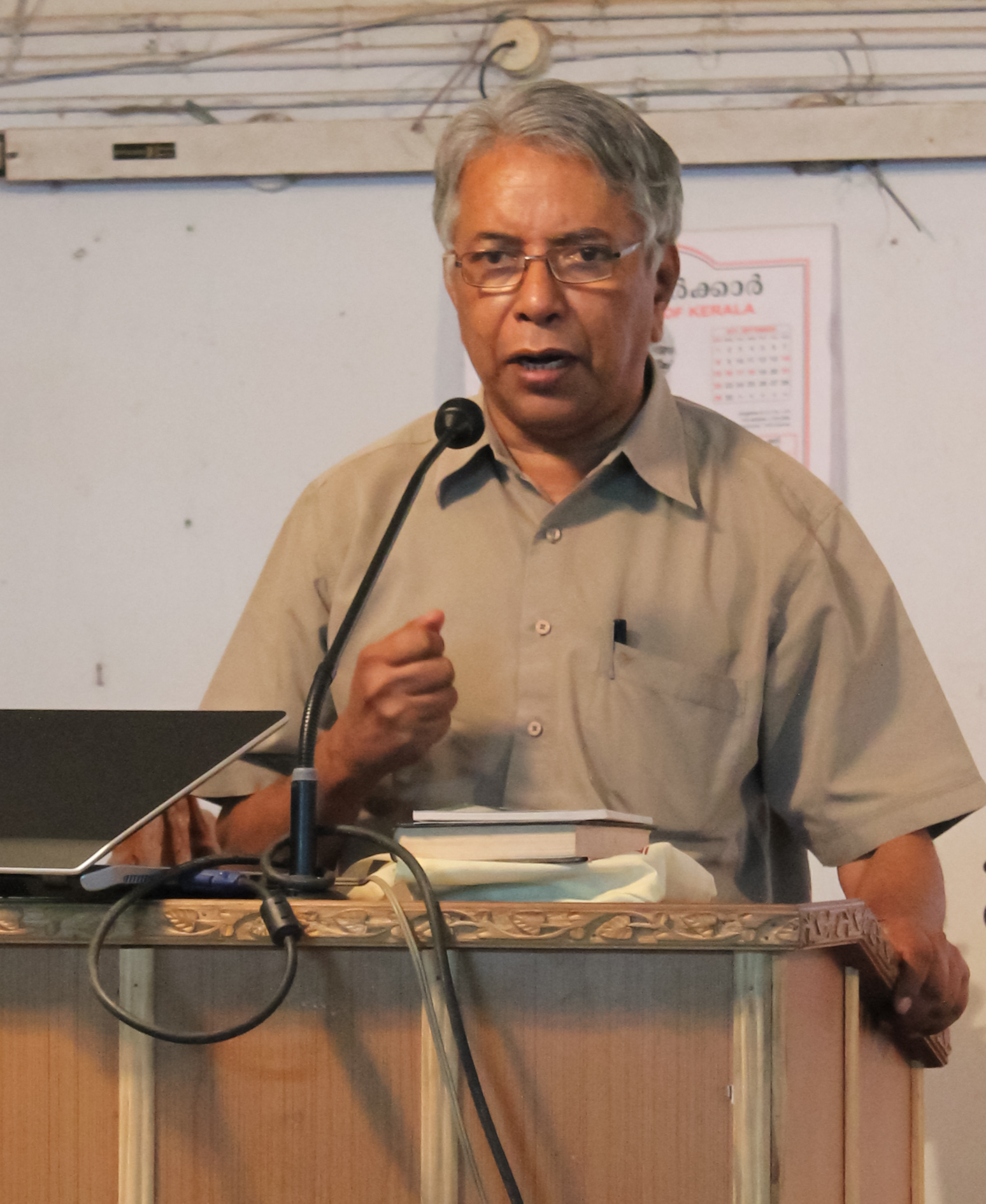
- Born: Scaria Zacharia; 1947; Kerala, India
- Died: 18 October 2022
- Occupation(s): professor, researcher, linguist

Scaria Zacharia was an Indian linguist, professor and researcher. He was a member of numerous significant research initiatives that received global notice and collaborated with many linguists and cultural experts from other nations. He played a key role in recovering the archival knowledge and Malayalam manuscript from the University of Tubingen in Germany. Later he published the digital versions of the architects. In 2022, Thunchath Ezuthachan Malayalam University and Mahatma Gandhi University honoured him with honorary D lit. Scaria Zacharia is the winner of Kerala Sahitya Akademi’s Lifetime Achievement award. He died on 18 October 2022 due to age related issues.

== Life ==
Scaria Zakaria was born in 1947 in Karikampalli, Edatwa Chekidikad. He graduated in Physics from Changanassery S.B. In 1968, he received the Sachivothamaswarna Medal of the University of Kerala. In 1969, he also completed his post-graduation in Malayalam literature. In 1992, he received his Ph.D. from the Department of Linguistics, University of Kerala.

He served as a visiting professor at School of Letters and Kerala Kalamandal which was Mahatma Gandhi University, Kottayam. Scaria Zacharia workers as the editor of a tri -monthly Malayalam and English-language journal, Thapasam. He has collaborated with Krishna Waryar and worked as a Senior Advisor to Kerala Government's Muziris Heritage Project. Scaria was also a Curator at Hermann Gundert Museum, Thalassery.

== Published books ==
- Ancient Prose Models - From Udayamperur to Milan. Published in 2019 by Sahitya Karganda Cooperative.
- Malayalam Ways - Selected Essays of Scariya Zakaria (Edited by Dr N Ajayakumar and Dr Sunil P Ilaidam) published by Sahitya Karganda Cooperative Sangh in 2019.
- Karkuzhali - Jewish Malayalam Girls Songs. Published by Children's Literature Institute.
- Malayalam and Herman Gundert - Thunchathathuktachachan published by Malayalam University
- Karkuzhali - Yefefia, Jewish Women's Songs in Malayalam with Hebrew Translations (edited with Ofira Gamliel, with a foreword and critical introduction) was published by the Ben-Zvi Institute of the Hebrew University of Jerusalem in 2005.
- Oh lovely parrot! Jewish Women's Songs from Kerala (with translation by Barbara Johnson). Published in 2005 by the Jewish Music Research Center of the Hebrew University of Jerusalem.
- In Minum Land Leben Verscheiden Volker (An Anthology of Malayalam Jewish Music. Published in association with Albrecht Fens. With German transl.). Published in 2002 by Schwaben Verlag, Germany. Changanassery '99 (A Polyphonic Experimental Local History). Published in 1999 by Current Books, Kottayam.
- 500 Years of Kerala - A Cultural Study (co-authored with Vijayamohan Pillai and VJ Varghese) was published in 1999 by the Association for Comparative Studies, Current Books Compilations, reprints, publication of historical documents, etc. (with commentary)
- Discussion and Supplement ( a 280-page appendix to Dr. PJ Thomas's 1935 work Christians and Malayalam Literature ) This study brings to the forefront of the academic world 100 rare books of the eighteenth and nineteenth centuries. This work makes extensive use of documents obtained from the University of Tubignon.
- In 1989, D.C. Published by Books.

Kadankathas (800 famous Kerala riddles classified based on the imagery they use. Most of the Kadam Kathas are based on coconut, elephant, chenda, river etc. Published in 1988 by Assisi Book House, Changanassery.

- Selected Short Stories 1987 (with Critical Introduction - Acquisition) D.C. Books 1988
- Selected Short Stories 1986 (with Critical Introduction - Acquisition) D.C. Books 1987
- Two ancient prose works (comprising two missionary Malayalam prose works of 1599 and 1606, accompanied by a long critical account of historical and linguistic significance and a glossary of old words) published in 1976.
