= Death of Sidharthan =

2024 death of a Kerala student

- Date: February 18, 2024; 2 years ago
- Location: Kerala Veterinary and Animal Sciences University, Kerala, India
- Inquiries: Kerala Police investigations

On 18 February 2024, Sidharthan, a 20-year-old veterinary science student of Kerala Veterinary and Animal Sciences University, was found dead in his hostel in Pookode, Wayanad, Kerala. The Students' Federation of India (SFI) branch at the university was accused of ragging Sidharthan because Sidharthan had danced with some senior female students at a Valentine's Day event. Leadership of the Students' Federation of India visited Sidharthan's family and apologized for the conduct of SFI members at the university.

== Investigation ==
On 18 February, Sidharthan was found hanging in the washroom of his hostel. An autopsy suggested that Sidharthan had died due to hanging, and that prior to his death, Sidharthan had "sustained multiple blunt injuries" and had not eaten.

Following his death, the Students' Federation of India (SFI) branch at the university was accused of ragging Sidharthan, which had led to his death; Sidharthan's parents accused the group of murdering him outright.

According to police, there had been a 'tiff' on 14 February because Sidharthan had danced with some senior female students at a Valentine's Day event. This escalated into "brutal assault" by a group of senior students in the courtyard of the hostel on 15 February. Sidarthan contacted his mother briefly on 16 February, saying he was not feeling well and was resting.

The Special Investigation Team of Kerala Police arrested four SFI Kerala leaders on 1 March 2024. The SFI also fired the four. By 1 March, 11 people had been arrested in connection with the death, with 18 students accused in total.

== Reactions ==
Kerala governor Arif Mohammed Khan issued an order suspending the Vice-Chancellor of Kerala Veterinary and Animal Sciences University (KVASU) over Sidharthan's death on 2024 February 18.

Kerala General Education minister V Sivankutty said that the government will take strict action against those behind the death of Sidharthan.

Indian National Congress’s V D Satheesan, the Leader of Opposition, called on Kerala's Chief Minister, Pinarayi Vijayan, to have the Central Bureau of Investigation investigate the death.

The leadership of the Students' Federation of India visited Sidharthan's family and apologized for the conduct of SFI members at the university.
