= Bangalore Central Prison =

Prison in Karnataka, India

Central Prison, Bangalore
- Interactive map of Central Prison, Bangalore
- Location: Parappana Agrahara, Bengaluru, Karnataka, India; 12.878465°N 77.6630495°E
- Status: Operational
- Security class: Central Prison
- Capacity: 2,200
- Population: 4,400+ (October 2016)
- Opened: 2000

Central Prison, Bengaluru (also called Bengaluru Central Jail and Parappana Agrahara Central Prison) is the largest prison in the Indian state of Karnataka. Established in 1997, it became the central prison of Bengaluru in 2000 when the old jail, which has since been converted to Freedom Park, was shut for renovation.

As of July 2023, the prison is spread over 40 acres and is the most overcrowded prison in Karnataka with more than 5,000 inmates despite its capacity being only 2,200.

== Awards ==
The Central Prison was adjudged as the best prison at the 6th All India Prison Duty Meet in Prison Hygiene Competition in September 2022 in which all the states and Union Territories participated at Ahmedabad. The Prison was also awarded 'four star' rating by Food Safety and Standards Authority of India (FSSAI) in June 2021 for hygiene and upkeep of the premises.

== Notable inmates ==
- Darshan – actor, domestic violence in 2011, accused in the murder of Renukaswamy in 2024
- Sanjjana – actress, accused in Sandalwood drug racket case
- Ragini Dwivedi – actress, accused in Sandalwood drug racket case
- Ranya Rao – actress, sentenced in gold smuggling case
- V. K. Sasikala and Tamil Nadu Chief Minister Jayalalithaa– politician
- Abdul Karim Telgi – convicted counterfeiter (died 2017)
