= 2022 Palakkad bus accident =

Bus collision in Kerala, India

Details
- Date: 5 October 2022; 10.30 PM IST
- Location: Vadakkanjery, Palakkad, Kerala
- Country: India
- Operator: Private bus
- Incident type: Crashed into another bus

Statistics
- Passengers: 47
- Deaths: 10
- Injured: 38

On 5 October 2022, a bus carrying 47 people crashed into the back of a KSRTC bus in Vadakkencherry, Palakkad district of Kerala at night. 9 people (5 students, 1 teacher and 4 travelers in the KSRTC bus) were killed and 38 were injured in the accident. The accident occurred due to the over speed of the bus and the driver's negligence. On further investigation it was found that the speed governor of the bus had detached from its fitting. Driver Jomon went in unstable mental stage and committed suicide on 1 August 2024.

The Motor Vehicle Department's final report on the accident concluded that over-speeding by the tourist bus was the primary cause of the fatal incident. The investigation involved thorough analysis of CCTV footage, interviews with injured individuals, and testimonies from those engaged in the immediate rescue efforts.

Furthermore, the report dismisses determined the collision was not the result of the KSRTC bus suddenly braking, but rather the fault of the tourist bus driver.

== Aftermath ==
After the accident, Kerala high court registered a case suo motu and criticized the transport department for not making strict safety norms for private bus operators. After this incident, all buses are colored in white with standard lines across, Strict Restrictions came for adding accessories in buses.
