= Abdu Rahman Nagar =

Abdul Rahiman Nagar Kolappuram A.R. Nagar
- Census town
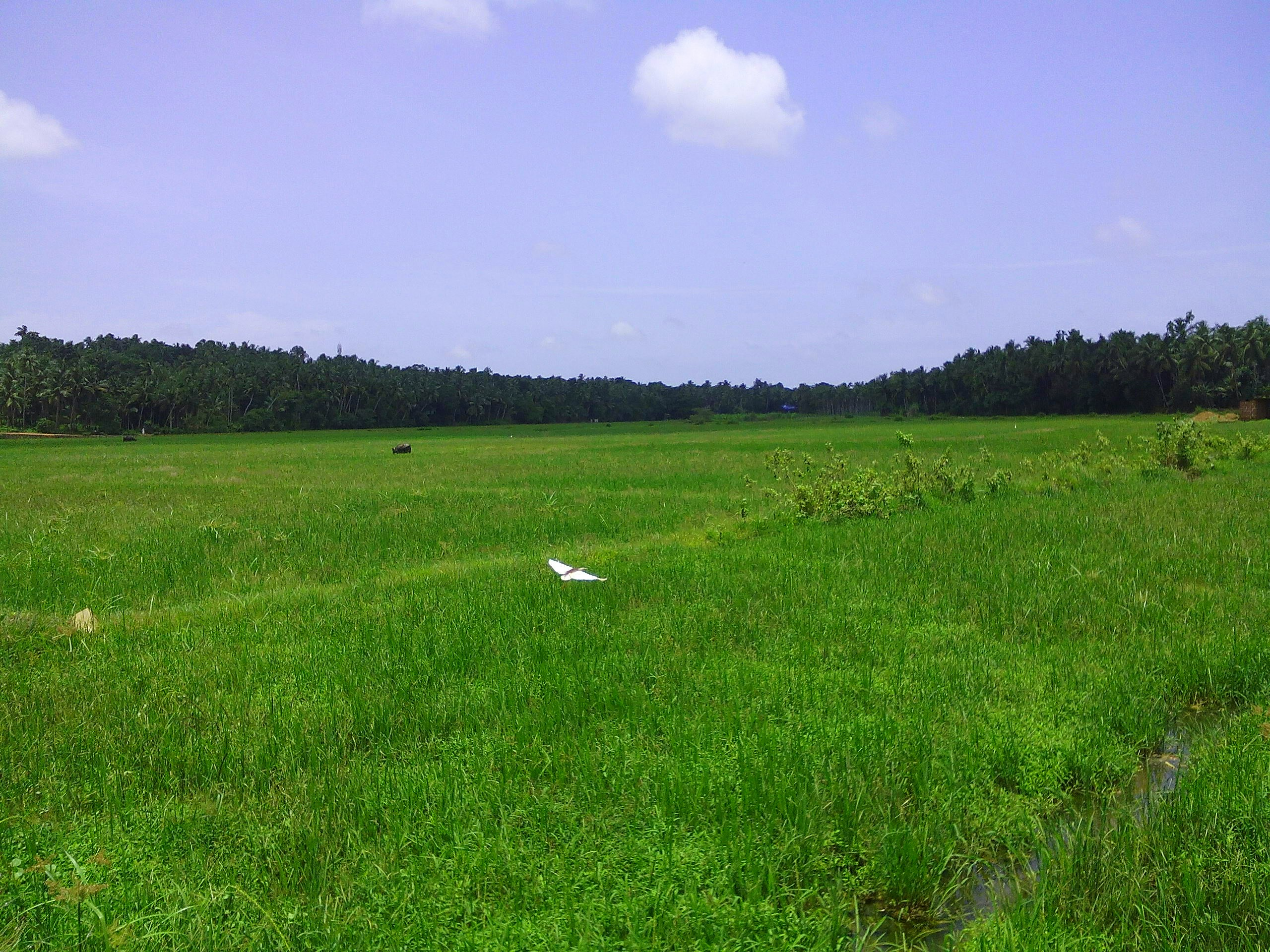
- Pottanil paddy fields
- Interactive map of Abdul Rahiman Nagar
- Coordinates: 11.074450°N 75.9368600°E
- Country: India
- State: Kerala
- District: Malappuram

Population (2011)
  - Total: 41,993

Languages
  - Official: Malayalam, English
- Time zone: UTC+5:30 (IST)
- PIN: 676305
- Vehicle registration: KL 65
- Website: www.arnagar.com

Abdu Rahiman Nagar is a census town in Malappuram district in the state of Kerala, India. It is also the name of a Grama Panchayat.

== Demographics ==
As of 2011 India census, Abdu Rahiman Nagar had a population of 41993 with 20220 males and 21773 females.

== Etymology ==
The name Abdu Rahiman Nagar came from the name of freedom fighter Mohammed Abdul Rahiman.

== Transportation ==
A.R.Nagar village connects to other parts of India through Parappanangadi town. National highway No.66 passes through A.R.Nagar and the northern stretch connects to Goa and Mumbai. The southern stretch connects to Cochin and Trivandrum. State Highway No.28 starts from Nilambur and connects to Ooty, Mysore and Bangalore through Highways.12,29 and 181. The nearest airport is at Kozhikode. The nearest major railway station is at Parappanangadi.

== Image Gallery ==
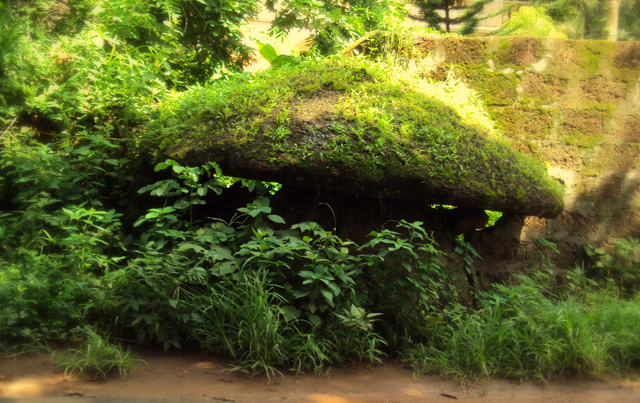
Kodakallu in AR Nagar
