= Vedam Jaishankar =

Indian cricket correspondent

Vedam Jaishankar is an Indian cricket correspondent with a career spanning three decades during which he has travelled to six continents while covering cricket. After a stint with the Deccan Herald, he moved to The Indian Express where he was the principal cricket correspondent for many years. He is the author of a popular book, Rahul Dravid: A Biography.

== Early life ==
Jaishankar played school, college and club cricket. He coached for a few years in the Brijesh Patel Cricket Academy before the demands of journalism made him give up coaching.

He has occasionally done television and radio commentary of the game. Jaishankar was the office bearer of the Sports Writers Association of Bangalore and its parent body the Sports Journalist Federation of India. He received an award for excellence in sports journalism from the Karnataka state government. He also served on the Board of Control for Cricket in India's Accreditation Committee in two World Cup tournaments.

== Career ==
After working with the Deccan Herald, he had a long stint with The New Indian Express as its main cricket writer. Later, Jaishankar worked briefly as the founder managing editor of Bangalore Bias, an English-language afternoon paper in Bangalore which stopped publication after a few years. He also worked for the Times of India.

He has authored four books: the best-seller, Rahul Dravid: A Biography, Casting a Spell: The Story of Karnataka Cricket, Courage, Conviction, Controversy and Cricket, and Developing Champions in Cricket (2026). The Dravid biography has been translated into four languages. A veteran of several World Cups, he last covered the 2003 tournament in South Africa, for Vijay Times that he helped launch. Jaishankar writes for SPIN, a British cricket magazine, besides a number of Indian publications. He also teaches sports journalism.
