= K. S. Bhavani Shankar =

Indian Mridangam player, music composer and film actor

K. S. Bhavani Shankar (born 16 October 1965), is an Indian Mridangam player, music composer and film actor known for his accompanying skills for Indian classical music and Dance. He was chosen Best Accompanying artist in 1983, from Bangalore Gayana Samaj. He was conferred the title "Mridanga Chatura" in 1984 by the Bangalore Gayana Samaj. In 1996, he was awarded an Arts Council of England travel grant, the highest award given to traditional artists and musicians to perform outside UK.

== Early life and education ==
Shankar was born in Mangalore, India to the legendary Bharatanatyam artist Karnataka Kalashree Guru K. Shiva Rao and Padmavathi S. Rao. He attended Saraswathi Tutorial Institute in Chicklalbagh, Balepet, Bangalore, for his primary education. His secondary education was at National High School, Basavanagudi, Bangalore and his Bsc course at National College, Basavanagudi, Bangalore. His mridangam training began under Sri R. Srivasan and then continued under M. Vasudev Rao and legendary Padma Vibhushan Dr. Umayalpuram K Sivaraman.

== Career ==
Bhavani was performing by age twelve. He had traveled throughout India and was chosen to travel to Himachal Pradesh and Manipur for an interstate cultural exchange programme organised by the Department of Kannada and Culture, Karnataka in 1986. He went to Singapore in 1987, beginning his international career performing in Singapore. In 1990 he toured with Tribhang, a group of six artists including dancers and musicians to Europe and UK. His talent as a mridangam artist was recognised by Mathoor Krishna Murthy, Director of Bharatiya Vidya Bhavan, London where he was invited to join the faculty of Indian Music and Dance. He carved out a niche for himself as a leading percussionist in the United Kingdom.

Bhavani actively associates himself with experimental works in collaboration with the notables of Western music. he worked with the pop group Massive Attack and the album enjoyed a worldwide audience thanks to MTV and the BBC.

Bhavani is a founding member of SAMUDRA, a performing arts company that promotes Indian Music and Dance by collaborating with Western Music.

The first South Indian drum album, released in 2003 on the Dream Records label, was named Rhythm Divine and earned Best Album of South Indian percussion.

=== Recognition ===
- Awarded Mridanga Chatura in 1984, the youngest percussionist to be awarded this title, given to young artists by the Bangalore Gayana Samaja
- Awarded Best Percussionist in 1983 in recognition of his outstanding ability in playing Ghatam at the festival.
- Rhythm Divine was awarded Best-ever South Indian Percussion album
- Received 1996 Arts Council Grant, UK, the most prestigious honour for a master in the traditional arts to perform outside UK.

=== Festivals ===
- Rhythm Sticks Festival 99, UK
- Womad Festival, UK
- Music Festival, Chennai
- Glastonbury Festival, UK
- South Indian Cultural Festival, Salisbury Theatre, UK
- Edinburgh International Festival, UK
- Bradford Mela, UK
- London Jazz Festival, UK
- Norwich Music Festival, UK
- Dartington Arts Festival, UK

== Personal life ==
Shankar was married to Thanuja Mohanan, a Bharatanatyam dancer and teacher. They have a son Sachin Shankar studying at Nice International School, France.

He is now married to Mona Jaiswal and has a son Siddhant Edekar and a daughter Bhairavi Shankar studying in London.
