= Synthite =

Indian oleoresin extraction firm

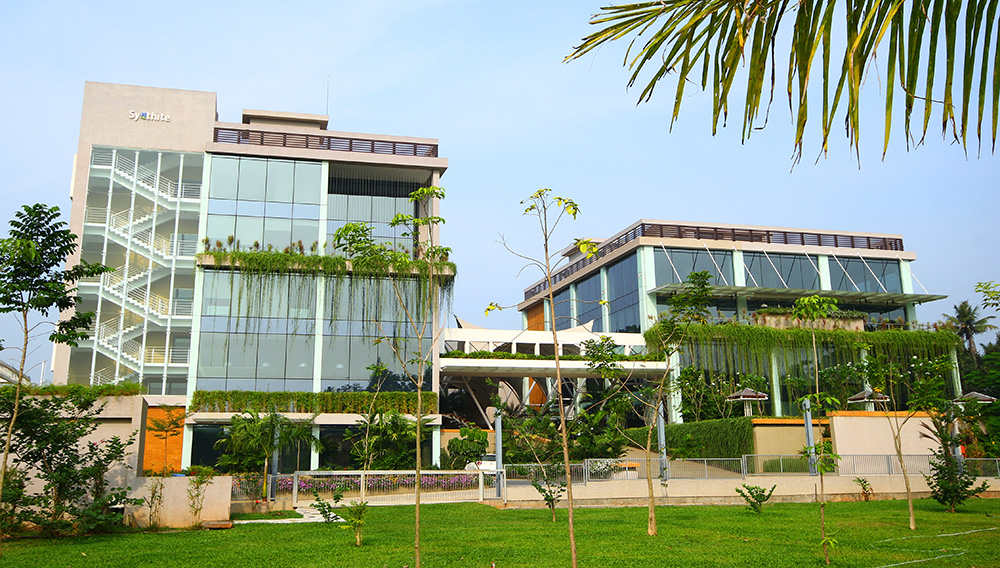
- Corporate office of Synthite Industries Ltd in Kolenchery, Kerala, India
- Type: Privately held company
- Industry: Manufacturing
- Founded: 1972
- Founder: C V Jacob
- Headquarters: Kolenchery (Ernakulam district), Kerala, India
- Area served: Worldwide
- Key people: Late C V Jacob; (Chairman); Dr. Viju Jacob; (Managing Director)
- Products: Value added spice extracts (oleoresins)
- Website: http://www.synthite.com

Synthite Industries Private Ltd. is an Indian oleoresin extraction firm, world's largest producer of spice extracts, spice powders, and essential oils. Synthite has footprints in India, China, Brazil, USA, Vietnam and Sri Lanka. The company employs 2000 people and supports a farmer community of around 14,000. Its major clients include Nestle, Unilever, ITC, Bacardi and PepsiCo. The company is run by the founder's son, Dr. Viju Jacob. and is headquartered in Kochi, India.

== History ==
The company was established in 1972 with 20 employees. It was founded by C. V. Jacob, after working in civil construction for two decades. It produced industrial chemicals before it shifted to oleoresins. The oleoresin business was initially based on research by the Central Food Technological Research Institute in Mysore. However, the technology developed was not mature, and Synthite invested years of research and development to make the technology viable. After another four years they convinced food producers that they could produce quality products on time.

In 2018, Synthite inaugurated its blending facility in São Paulo, Brazil and produced up to 190 tonnes per annum of oleoresin and essential oil blends.

The Synthite Industries Employees’ Union (affiliated to CITU) called a strike in the first week of April, 2018 after seven employees were transferred to other states. The 37-day-long strike was called off after talks held in the presence of the labour commissioner turned violent.

The following year, the company started its third manufacturing facility located at Wucheng county in Dezhou in China's Shandong province. Observers quoted by Outlook, an Indian magazine, felt that the company has over-invested in capacity, increasing their costs.
