= Migrant labourers in Kerala =

Kerala workforce

Total population
- 5 million (50 lakh) (2020)

Regions with significant populations
- Ernakulam: > 800,000
- Thiruvananthapuram: >800,000
- Kozhikode: >400,000
- Palakkad: >400,000
- Other districts: ~3,000,000

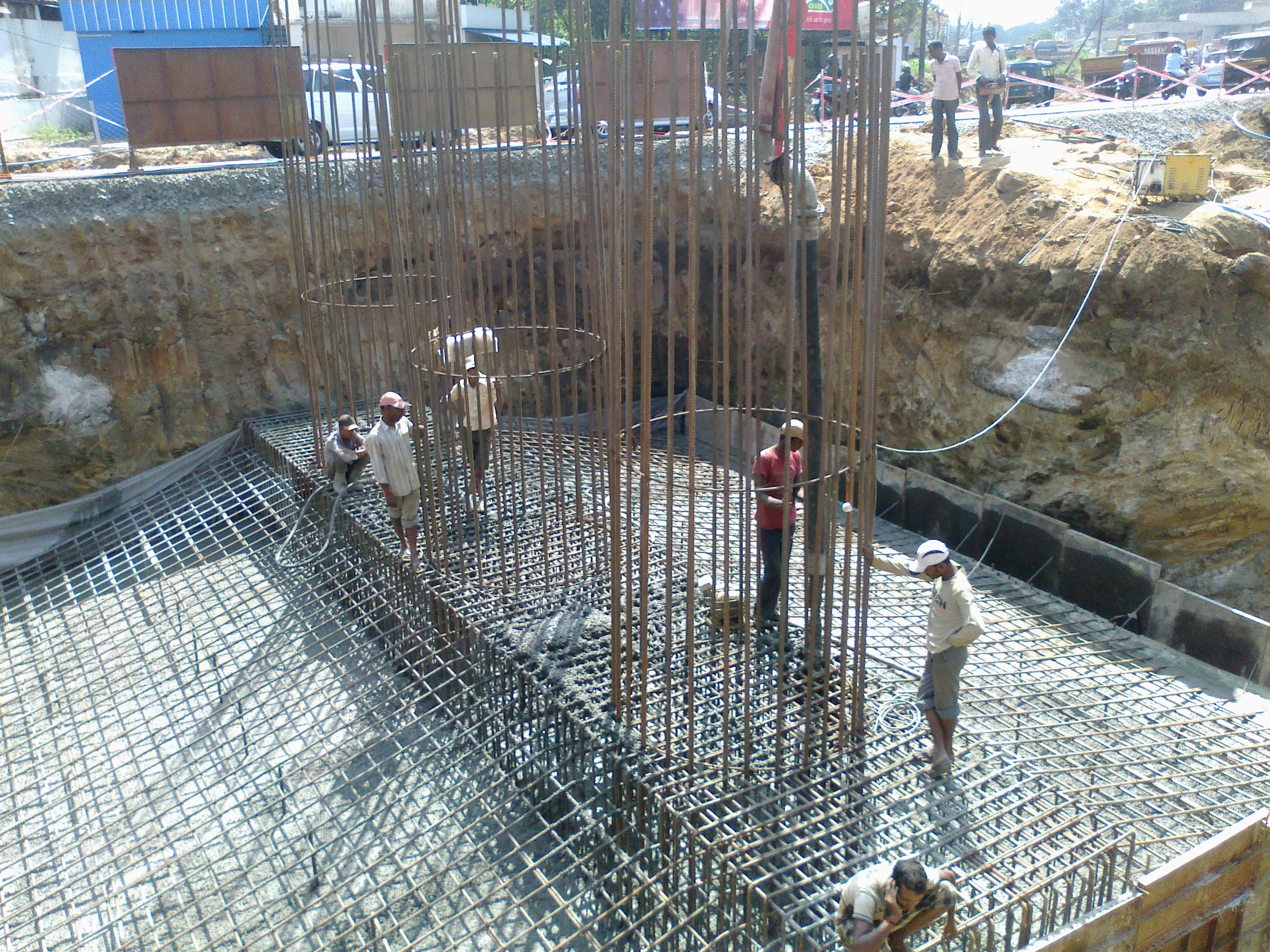
Concrete pumping for an abutment

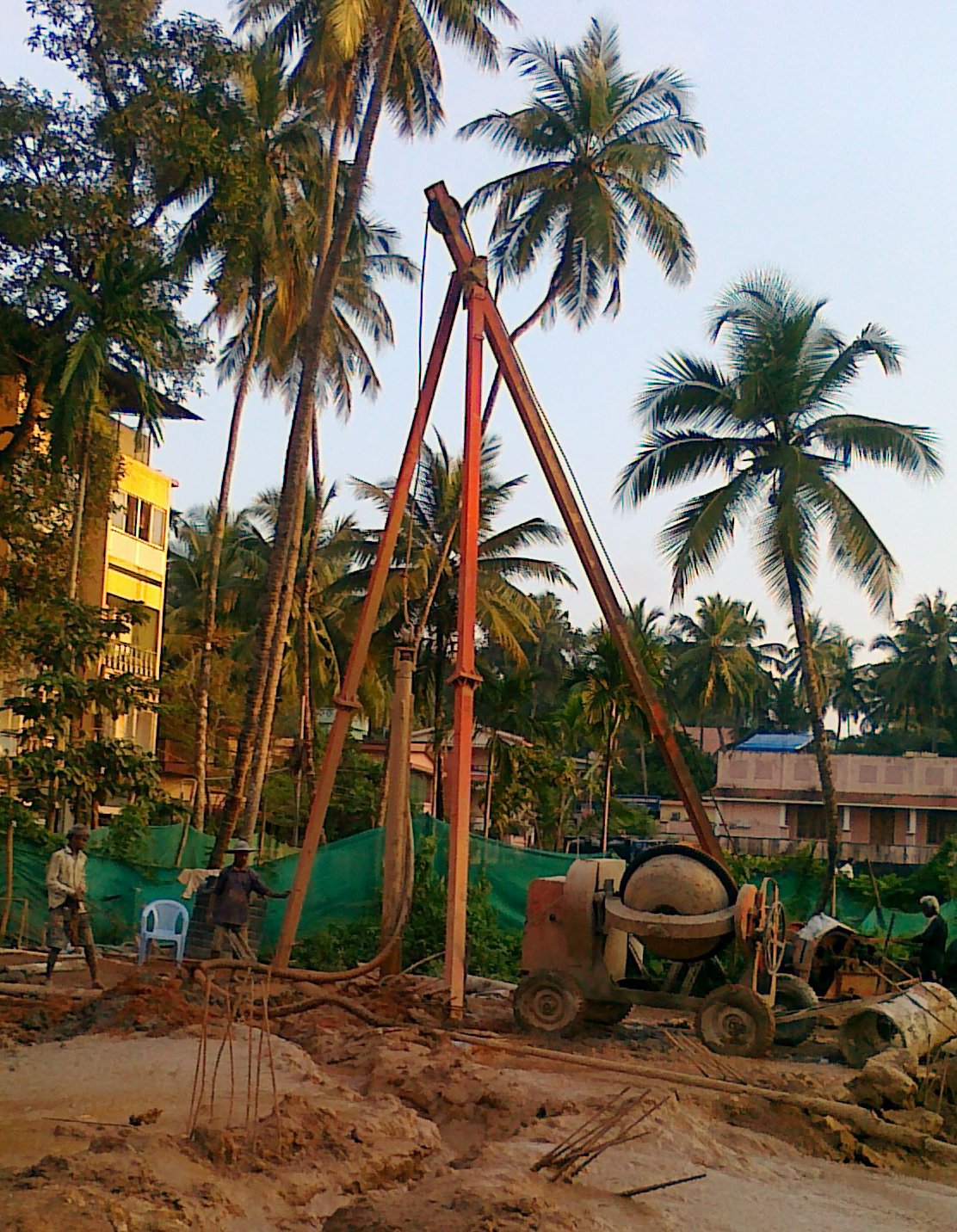
Machinery used for piling

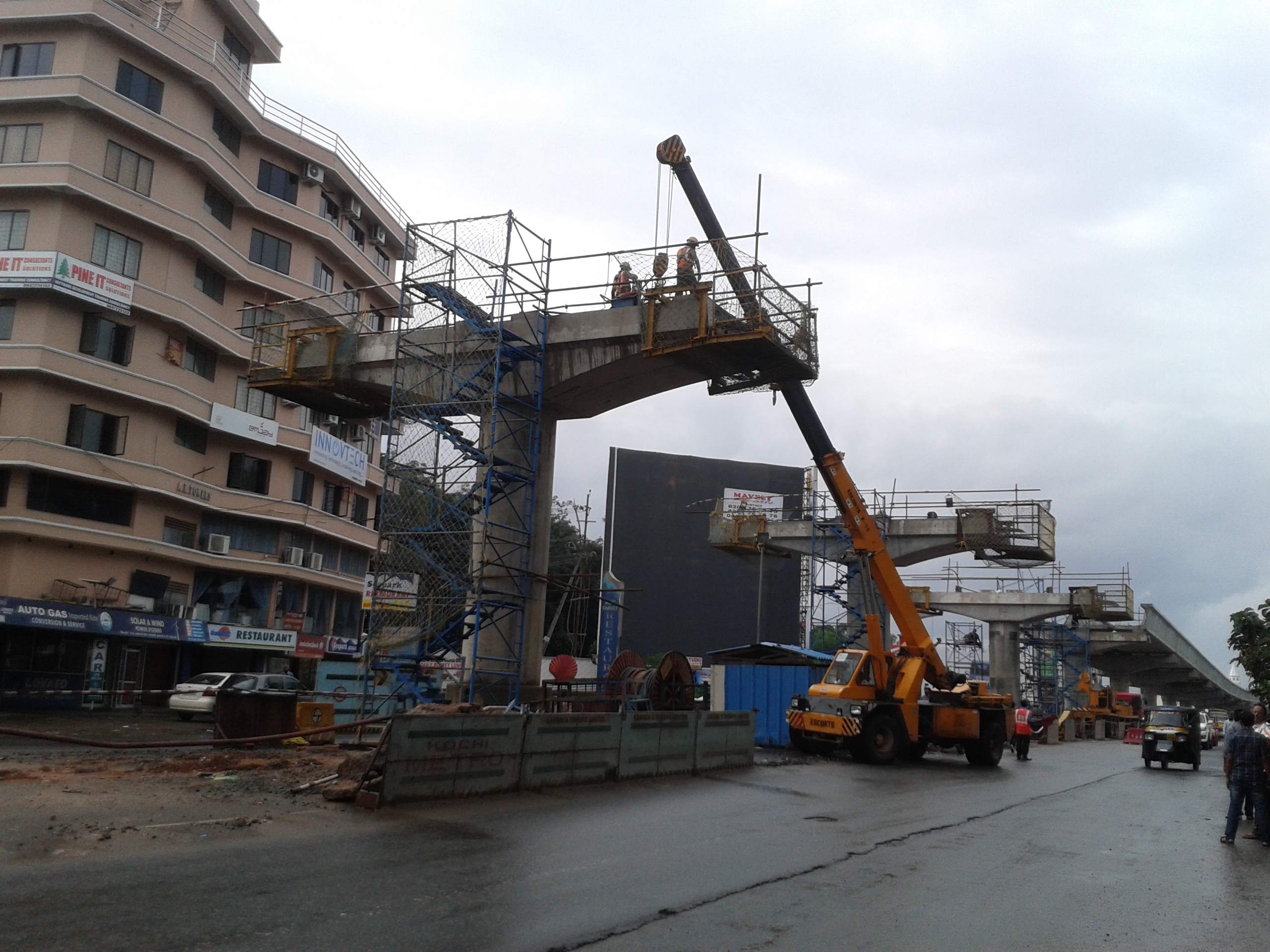
Kochi metro construction

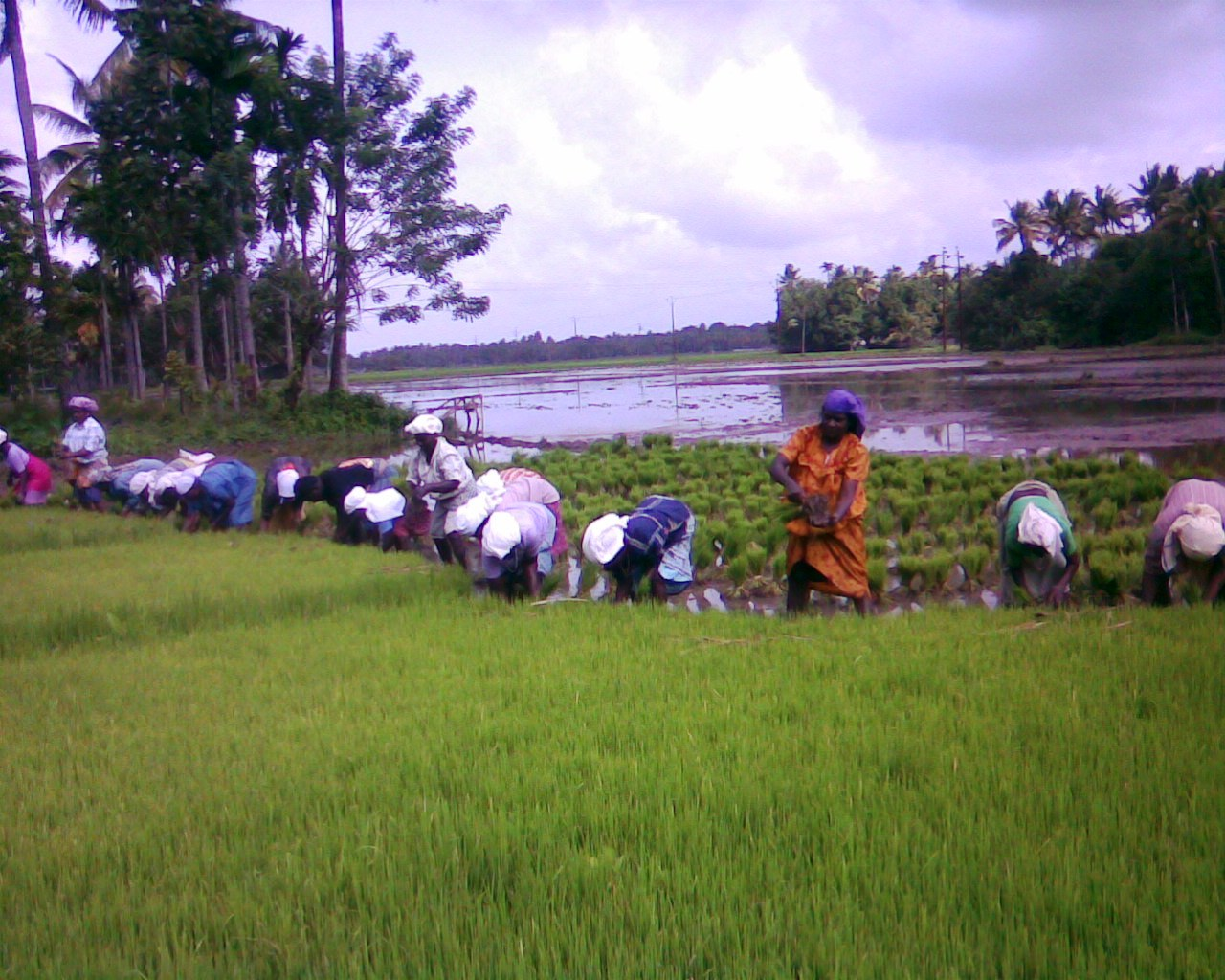
Migrant workers find work in paddy fields

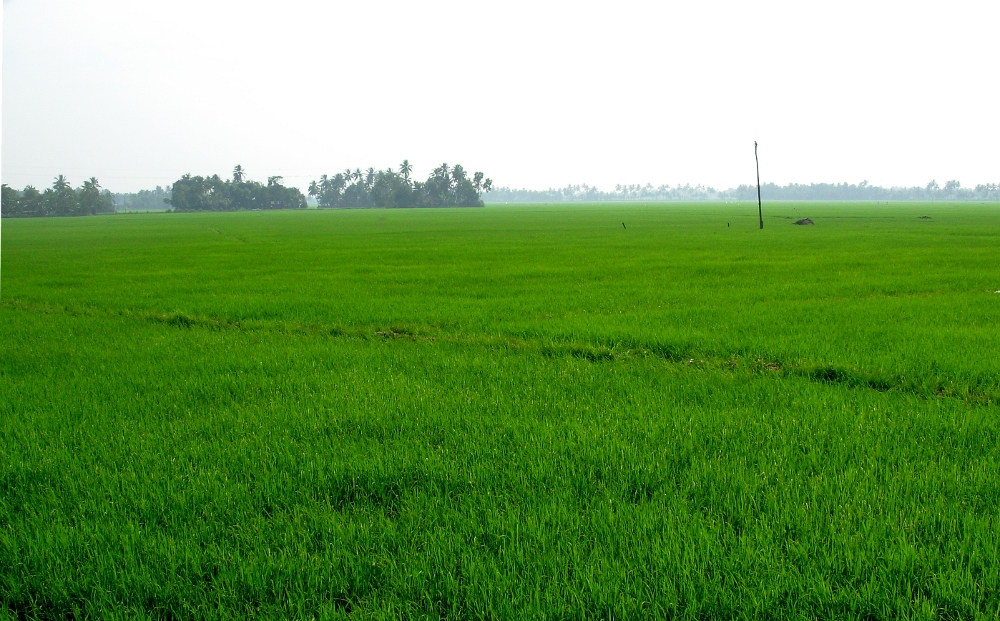
Migrant workers find work in paddy fields

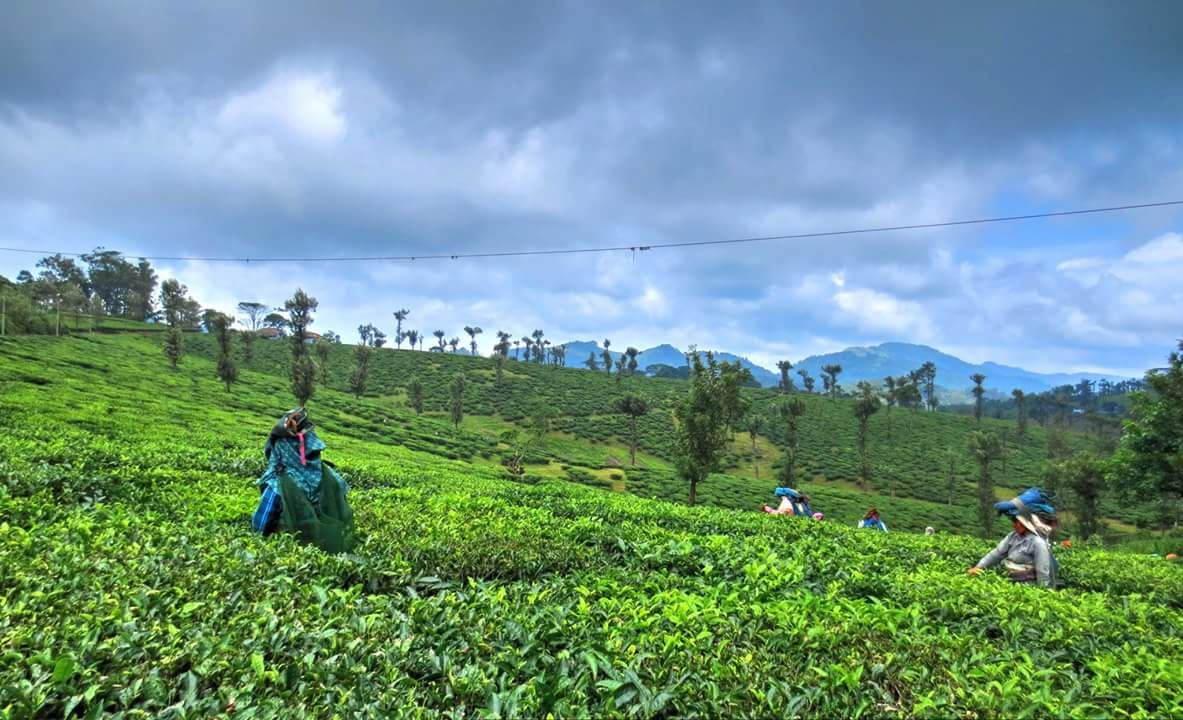
Tea and coffee plantations

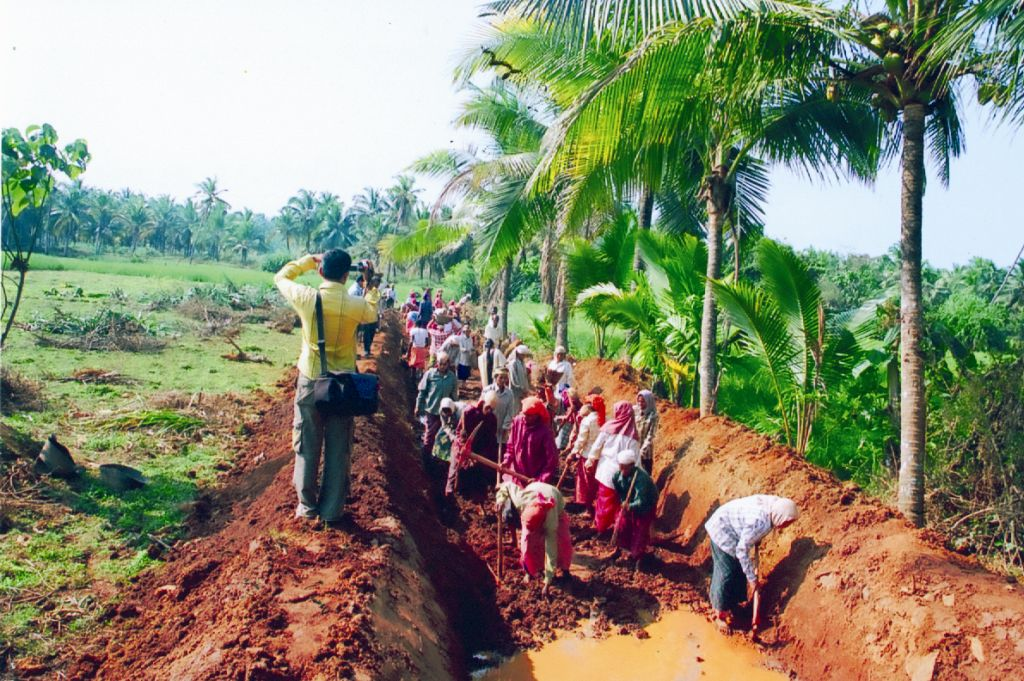
Construction work performed by migrants

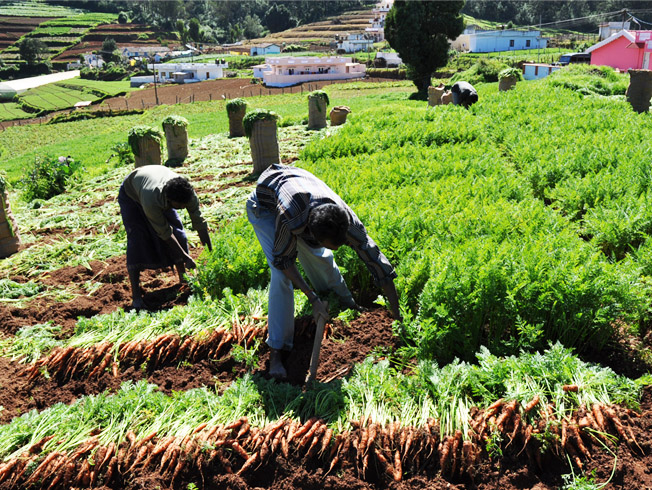
Migrants farming

Migrant labourers in Kerala, India's southernmost state, are a significant economic force in the state; there were around 2.5 million internal migrants in Kerala according to a 2013 study by the Gulati Institute of Finance and Taxation. Every year, the migrant worker population in Kerala increases by 2.35 lakh (235,000) people. The study, based on long-distance trains terminating in Kerala, does not cover migrants from the neighbouring states who use other modes of transport. Assuming that the estimation is rigorous and extrapolating it, taking into account the net annual addition, possible growth in migration rate, as well as accounting for the migration from the neighbouring states, Kerala is likely to have 5 to 5.5 million inter-state migrant workers in 2020. Despite their importance and despite many of them praising the state for its welfare schemes and environment, they are often ignored in comparison and suffer from comparatively poor living conditions.

== Background ==
There are both economic and social imbalances among states in India and this leads to internal migration in general. High literacy rates, better education and lack of professional and skilled jobs had prompted Keralites to look for higher wages and skilled labour outside India. This trend then led to a decline in the availability of workforce in Kerala especially in unskilled jobs. Kerala has the lowest population growth rate in the country and is set to become the first state with zero population growth, or even with a negative growth rate. The child population growth is currently negative at -8.44%. In less than a decade, the Keralite population is set to decrease. Schools have been reporting vacancy of seats not because of drops in enrollment, but simply as there are no children to send. Therefore, with an ageing population like in Europe combined with the tendency of youth migrating abroad, the shortage of workers is bound to increase.

== Studies ==
According to a study, Kerala is not able to create enough jobs that are suitable for an increasingly larger number of young people with high levels of education. Although lack of jobs was the main reason for migration of Keralites before 2000, the notion of higher wages abroad has gained traction among Keralites even though currently the wages obtained in Kerala have become similar to those obtained abroad in many cases. Additionally, the glamour associated with Gulf emigration is still very strong among the young in Kerala. This is an important factor in their decision to emigrate instead of working in the state. The Kerala Migration Survey (2014) conducted by the Centre for Development Studies, Thiruvananthapuram, found that the inability to generate employments to retain the educated youth was one reason why migration had increased – instead of dipping as forecast a few years earlier. But, several thousand educated youths have moved to the Gulf for low-skill jobs they wouldn't do in Kerala. Migration therefore also takes place either because the locals have priced themselves out of the informal service sector, or, as in big cities like Mumbai, they have placed some tasks beneath them and migrants fill the gap.

According to a 2013 study conducted by Mr. M. P. Joseph IAS (R), Dr. D. Narayana and Dr. C. S. Venkiteswaran on behalf of the Gulati Institute of Finance and Taxation for the Department of Labour and Skills of the Government of Kerala, there are over 25 lakh(2.5 million) domestic migrant labourers in Kerala from other states of India, as well as from Bhutan and Nepal, in 2016 this figure stood over 40 lakhs (4 million) with an annual arrival rate of 2.35 lakhs with a sum of Rs 25,000 crores going outside the state each year as wages to the migrant workers. According to official estimates, the expatriate Malayali population earns in excess of Rs. 75,000 crore annually. The number of migrant workers in Kerala is much larger compared to only 16 lakh (1.6 million) Keralites working outside India In 2013, the number of migrant workers in Kerala was almost one-tenth of that of the local population which was about 33 million in 2011. It is estimated to rise as high as 48 lakhs (4.8 million) by 2023 despite the decline of migration of Keralites to other countries. Besides, within 10 years, the majority of the local population would have aged above 40 years and this could lead to a further increase of migration from other states. In many cases, the high linguistic, social and cultural differences of Kerala and these other states and the large distance make it similar to international migration rather than internal migration.

== Possible causes ==
Kerala offers the best wage rates in the country in the unorganised sector. Sustained job opportunities, peaceful social environment, relatively less discriminatory treatment of workers, presence of significant others, direct trains from native states, the ease with which the money they earn can be transferred home and the penetration of mobile phones cutting short the distance from homes influenced the migration to Kerala. There are push and pull factors attracting migrants to Kerala. According to Dr. Manav Paul, the push factors are mostly poverty, unemployment, density of population, bad yield from agriculture, low demand for labourers and other factors like raising up families, lack of civil activities in the residential area, disasters, internal fights on basis of caste, creed, race affect the flow of migrants to Kerala. Pull factors like better employment opportunities, standard of life in Kerala, high wages compared to other states, minimal or absence of communal clashes, high health indices, and provision of education for children also attract migrants to Kerala, as well as an ongoing labor shortage in Kerala and greater healthcare availability. However, despite these motivations, migrants often find that they are unable to access the same benefits as locals.

=== Push factors ===
Migration has been a livelihood strategy for millions of rural poor in India for decades. Low wages, limited and irregular employment opportunities, failed crops, family debts and drought have been some of the major reasons that have pushed many people to leave their homes in search of jobs in Kerala too. Footloose labourers from Tamil Nadu have been lamenting about the lack of rains in their native place due to which agriculture is in a crisis. Workers from Anantapur in Andhra Pradesh and those from northern Karnataka were severely hit by drought. The major source areas from where workers come to Kerala are known for floods, cyclones as well as drought. In addition to these typical reasons, several workers from the eastern and northeastern states of India have cited political instability, caste oppressions and communal violence in their native places as reasons for migration. The enforcement of Foreigners Act by the current government in Assam has accentuated the movement of undocumented migrants from Bangladesh in Assam to Kerala.

=== Pull factors ===
Kerala offers the best wage rates in the country in the unorganised sector- almost double the national average in many categories. In the absence of the availability of native labour due to the demographic advancement and the resultant changes in the age structure of the population, the state is almost completely dependent on migrant labour. The high wage rates and the sustainable job opportunities have made Kerala one of the most sought after destinations in the country. Political stability, the comparatively peaceful social environment, and the relatively less discriminatory treatment meted out to migrants compared to many other potential destinations, also serve as additional pull factors. The Muslim and Christian migrants feel quite comfortable in the state compared to other parts of India which is a significant reason for Kerala being chosen as their work destination. Hindi and Odiya services are offered for the Christian migrants in select areas in Kerala, and Muslim labourers tend to live in areas with significant presence of native Muslim community. Some of the migrants who have come to Kerala with their families cited the availability of better educational and health facilities in Kerala as an additional impetus for sticking on here.

=== High wages ===
Kerala currently offers the highest wages not only in India but also among the SAARC Countries. The high minimum wages with comparatively better living conditions in Kerala, even in villages, are often what motivates migrant workers, as the wages are often double or even more than three times than wages obtained in other major cities in India, which also have higher living costs. This is often attributed to the socialist-leaning Kerala model of development and is a key attraction to the migrant labourers. For agricultural work like ploughing and tilling, the average daily wage in Kerala was more than Rs 713, followed by Tamil Nadu at Rs 515. The lowest wage being paid in the country was Rs 187. In states like Bihar, Uttar Pradesh, Gujarat and Odisha, workers are usually paid wages of around 200 rupees, but which can be as low as 90 rupees. The wages for non-agricultural work is also much higher in Kerala. Carpenters and plumbers get wages which are two times the national wage average for their profession. The data shows that while the average wage ranges are between Rs 200 and Rs 300 for different professions in states across the country, employers in Kerala do not pay below Rs 600 for any job. It is even said that a migrant labourer from Bihar, who would get Rs 40 at his native place, makes a minimum of Rs 600 in Kerala. However, Keralite workers are paid even higher amounts and so, most of the times the local residents prefer the migrant workers because of the comparatively cheaper labour and also because the migrants work harder than the locals. Even though the wages for labour are high, the cost of living in the state is the same or even lower than in many other parts of the country. Over 70 per cent of them earn wages above Rs.300 per day.

However, according to the last NSSO Survey (2011–2012), in the category of major states, Kerala has the highest unemployment rate (UR). Kerala's unemployment level is at 7.4%, while in other states it is below 4%. Even though the rate has declined over the years, 50 lakh (5 million) people are estimated to be unemployed in the state. The unemployment rate is lowest in Gujarat, at 0.5 per cent. However, Gujarat is a low-paying state on daily wages. Reading the two reports together, one can infer that while migrant labourers are attracted by the high daily wages, the natives are not opting for these jobs. Literacy and higher levels of education too has contributed to this attitude of considering some jobs as not respectable enough for a highly educated person.

As per a study in 2013, the expatriate Malayali population earns over 75000 crore rupees annually. These high inward remittances have increased the demand of local labour. According to a study conducted by GIFT, the migrant labourers in kerala send their homes approximately 17500 crore rupees. or an average of Rs 70,000 per person per year. These remittances are almost entirely sent home via bank services.

==== Average Wage Earnings per day ====
Kerala offers the best wages in unorganised sector among the subnational entities of South Asia, which might be a pull factor for the Migrant labourers in Kerala. According to the India Wage Report prepared by International Labour Organization in 2018, the states with the consistent highest casual wages in both rural and urban areas are Kerala, Jammu and Kashmir, Punjab, and Haryana. The existing wages for casual workers in Kerala is around 65% higher than that of India. It is notable that the wage rates for women in Kerala is 50% more than that of their counterparts in India. However it is much lesser than their male counterparts in Kerala.

Average wage earnings per day from casual labour work other than public works in Currently Week Status (CWS) for Kerala and India, in ₹
Period	K/I	Rural			Urban			Total		
Period	K/I	M	F	P	M	F	P	M	F	P
July–September 2018	Kerala	641.83	357.79	598.79	710.13	422.76	676.4	664.82	375.6	624.23
July–September 2018	India	276.92	170.1	253.93	342.15	204.73	319.3	287.88	174.54	264.38
October–December 2018	Kerala	659.41	377.8	605.64	678.44	365.85	649.06	666.26	375.43	620.16
October–December 2018	India	286.84	185.64	264.63	348.76	226.25	331.24	297.86	190.26	275.59
January–March 2019	Kerala	677.53	403.4	651.61	684.01	332.02	649.73	680.07	374.84	650.87
January–March 2019	India	287.36	190.23	267.42	357.53	220.22	339.15	299.08	193.44	278.56
April–June 2019	Kerala	732.17	388.32	697.18	680.32	372.25	648.27	710.77	381.59	676.96
April–June 2019	India	297.44	199.24	278.62	367.65	244.15	351.82	309.77	204.49	290.7

_{†M:Male, F:Female, P:Person}

=== Education ===
The Kerala government is considering the development of a Skill Development Institute for migrant workers. It has already established Indian Institute of Infrastructure and Construction in Kollam city and new centres of Kerala Academy of Skills Excellence (KASE) will be opened soon in other districts.

Although a large number of the children of migrant workers are enrolled in government schools, the state education department has opened schools for the children of migrant workers under Sarva Shiksha Abhiyan. Region specific teaching curriculum has to be often adopted as the origin and languages of migrants always differ.

Migrants are also taught reading and writing skills in Malayalam and Hindi through the state literacy mission. Hamari Malayalam textbooks and Changathi are provided to the migrant labourers and more than 400 migrants registered for the first classes which were conducted in unlikely places like inside factories and auditoriums, anganwadis and union offices, libraries and shelters.

=== Health and social security ===
Kerala is the first State in India to enact a social security scheme for the migrant workers and the State is the first to provide benefits to the job-seekers from outside with the Kerala migrant workers' welfare scheme set up in 2010. The police has started audits of migrant workers in cities like Kochi and Thiruvananthapuram through which biometric details have been captured and ID cards issued. In 2016, a new insurance scheme called Awas was launched to provide social security to the migrant workers and also to act as their database and registry as the crimes involving migrant workers are also rising along with the population. The government has also begun to open safe and clean hostels for migrant workers titled 'apna ghar' to take care of their dismal accommodation.

Kerala currently offers free health care for all the migrant workers and is planning legislation to address the migrant labourers issue with "The Kerala Migrant Workers Social Security Bill". The first official labour camp will also be opened for workers from the North and North eastern parts of the country in the Palakkad district which would accommodate about 1500 workers and camps will be established in all other districts in the next phase. The department also plans to start kiosks and call centres with people proficient in Hindi as staff to interact and understand the problems of the labourers. Migrant Suraksha Project is being implemented across the State under the aegis of the Kerala State Aids Control Society among migrant labourers since 2009 mainly to detect HIV+ cases among them and to create awareness and health cards also have been issued to the labourers. Many private foundations have their own 'migrant suraksha projects'and even free medical camps which aims to improve the life of migrants working in the state. Exclusive grama sabhas or village councils are planned for the migrant labourers to identify their issues and find solutions.

== Demographics ==
Authorities find it difficult to get an exact number since thousands of migrants are said to move through the state from one part to another every day and at least 1500 new migrants reach the state every week. While Kochi and Thiruvananthapuram continue to attract the largest number of migrants, cities like Kozhikode and Kollam also have a sizeable number of migrant workers. According to the 2013 study, which was based on a Survey of the Domestic Migrant Labour coming into and leaving Kerala, the remittances of migrant workers in Kerala to their home states are over Rs. 17,500 crores which is equivalent to 4 per cent of Kerala's gross domestic product. To put this in perspective; while the total remittances to Kerala from Keralites abroad, including in the Middle east countries from Apr 2013-Mar2014 were Rs 72,680 crores, the amount of household remittances to Kerala from its citizens abroad during Apr-March 2014 was only Rs 15,129 crores which is lesser than the amount which the migrant labourers in Kerala send to their home states

Migrant workers are a work force consisting almost entirely of single males aged between 18 and 35 years and are usually highly mobile within Kerala. According to a 2013 study commissioned by the government, every fourth male between the ages of 20 and 64 in the state is likely to be a migrant. Whereas 60 per cent of them work in the construction sector, they also work in the hospitality, manufacturing, trade and agriculture sectors. Their skills range from unskilled to skilled carpenters, masons, electricians and the like. Migrants now make around 65% of several private enterprises. In industries such as cashew, hotels, brick kilns, construction, quarries and fishing; their daily wages range from 400 to 900 rupees. Despite the fact that many migrants are not from West Bengal or Bangladesh, they are often known as "Bengalis" or "Bhais".

Traditionally, the largest number of migrant workers in Kerala used to come from Tamil Nadu with many Tamil colonies existing in Kerala and many of them having been integrated with the locals in Kerala. Although a few studies say that labourers from neighbouring states like Tamil Nadu and Karnataka far outnumber the others, the cultural similarities with Kerala makes them well integrated with the local population. In Kasaragod and Wayanad districts, most of the migrant labourers are from Karnataka. During the period from 1961 to 1991, workers from Tamil Nadu and Karnataka complemented the native workers in filling up the requirement of the blue-collar labour force. There were specific sectors where migrant labourers were largely absorbed. The plantations, the brick kilns, and work requiring digging up earth predominantly depended on migrant labour. Labour migration from beyond southern India started significantly with the arrival of migrants from Odisha to work in the timber industry in Ernakulam district. Even though there are still a large number of workers from Tamil Nadu and Karnataka, the trend in replacement labour seems to have reversed as according to the survey in 2023, 75 per cent of the migrant workers come from five states, namely West Bengal, Bihar, Uttar Pradesh , Rajasthan and Odisha. A large number consist of workers from Uttarakhand and Madhyapradesh as well. The languages seems to have found ground in Kerala with many shops advertising themselves also in Hindi and instances of local transport buses displaying destination names in Bengali and even Oriya. In Perumbavoor, one of the towns with the largest migrant population in the state (over 200,000 migrants), there are Bengali hotels, churches with gospels in Oriya and Imams from Bengal and Odisha who give their speeches in their respective languages, theatres playing Bengali, Assamese and Oriya movies as well as a Gandhi Bazaar and a Bhai Bazaar.

Some of the longest migration corridors in India have evolved in the past two decades connecting Kerala with eastern and northeastern India. The study identified 12 new inter-district corridors, where the distance between source and destination district ranges from 2,300 to 3,700 km. Tamil Nadu continues to be one of the major sources of footloose labour in Kerala. Migrants from 194 districts from across 25 Indian states Union Territories were found working in Kerala during 2016–2017. More than four-fifths of these districts belonged to eight Indian states. Tamil Nadu and Karnataka in the south, Jharkhand, Odisha, Bihar and West Bengal in the east and Assam in the northeast India were the major states of origin of migrant workers. Workers from far off districts such as Baramulla in Jammu and Kashmir to Namsai in Arunachal Pradesh were also found. Migrants from Meghalaya, Arunachal Pradesh, Manipur, Sikkim, Tripura and Assam worked in the textile and apparel sector. Boys from Nagaland were found working in the hospitality sector. Labourers from Rajasthan sold gadgets at busy traffic junctions in Kochi. Men and women from Andhra Pradesh sought work from Kochi city labour nakas. Workers from Madhya Pradesh were found in the plantations. Women workers from Maharashtra were found in Kasaragod. There were also workers from Nepal and Bangladesh.

According to S Irudaya Rajan, a professor and expert on migration studies at Thiruvananthapuram's Centre for Development Studies (CDS), Kerala is a field to watch out how migration, ageing and demographics change the landscape.

=== Origin statistics ===
State	Percentage share
West Bengal	41.4%
Assam	31.2%
others	27.4 %

=== Statistics by district ===
District	Population
Ernakulam	>800,000
Thiruvananthapuram	>800,000
Kozhikode	>400,000
Palakkad	>400,000
Thrissur	>200,000
Kannur	200,000
Malappuram	200,000
Others	150,000
Total	4,000,000

== State profiles ==
The below are profiles of the top 8 sourcing states for labourers in Kerala

=== Tamil Nadu ===
Contrary to the popular perceptions that migration from Tamil Nadu has significantly reduced, a 2017 research reveals that Tamil Nadu continues to be one of the major sources of footloose labour in Kerala. Among the eight leading source states, Tamil Nadu, along with Assam, had the largest number of districts from where workers were found in Kerala. Migrants from 24 out of the 32 districts in Tamil Nadu worked across all the districts in Kerala. The migration was mostly to Thiruvananthapuram and also to Kollam and Palakkad, three cities that share border with Tamil Nadu. Both men and women came from Tamil Nadu. In a lot of cases, both husband and wife came for work leaving the children behind with other family members. Migrants from Colachel in Kanyakumari district, Rameswaram in Ramanathapuram, Cuddalore and Thoothukudi districts constituted the majority among the traditional migrant fishers from various states who worked on boats that operated from Kerala coast. The plantations in Idukki and Wayanad also engage workers from Tamil Nadu. In most towns in Kerala, workers from Tamil Nadu were available and stayed in rented facilities scattered in and around the city.

=== Karnataka ===
Migrants from 17 districts in Karnataka worked in Kerala during 2016–2017. Migration from Karnataka to Kerala was mostly confined to the three districts of Wayanad, Kannur and Kasaragod which share borders with Karnataka A lot of workers from Karnataka came with their families that included small children. Kannadigas constituted the majority of the footloose labour in Kasaragod and Wayanad . Plantations in Wayanad and laterite mines in Kasaragod and Kannur engaged workers from Karnataka in significant numbers. Women from Karnataka also worked in the seafood sector in Alappuzha and in the apparel sectors in Trivandrum and Ernakulam districts.

=== Odisha ===
Odisha is the first state beyond south India from where workers came to Kerala in significant numbers. Migrants from 22 districts of Odisha- Western Odisha, Coastal Odisha, Southern Odisha and Northern Odisha, regions which have been identified as having distinct migration patterns, were found working in Kerala. A lot of workers from Odisha belonged to Mayurbhanj, Malkangiri, Gajapati, Rayagada, Kandhamal and Sundargarh, districts in Odisha with more than half of the population belonging to tribal communities. There were also Christian families among the Odiya workers. Some of them had moved out of Odisha during or after the Kandhamal riots in 2008.Except in the seafood, apparel and construction sectors, migration was driven by social networks. Traditional fishers from coastal Odisha worked on boats that operated from various harbours in Kerala.Women and girls from Balangir, Malkangiri, Sundargarh, Kandhamal, Ganjam, Nabarangpur and Rayagada worked in the textile and apparel sector in Kerala. Odiya families were concentrated in and around Perumbavoor in Ernakulam district. An Odiya service is available on Sundays at a church in Perumbavoor, Ernakulam district. A nursery school for children of Odiya workers has been functioning on the premises of the Keenpuram industrial estate at South Vazhakkulam for several years now. A majority of the children were from Rayagada.

=== Jharkhand ===
Workers from more than two-thirds of the districts in Jharkhand were engaged in various jobs in Kerala. Many of these districts such as Khunti, Gumla, Lohardaga, Simdega, Pakur, Dumka, Latehar and West Singhbhum are concentration areas of tribal populations. Families from Jharkhand worked in several plantations in Idukki and Thrissur districts. A lot of them belonged to the Oraon tribe. The textile and apparel industry engaged workers, mainly women and girls, from Jharkhand.Migration from Jharkhand appears to be mostly organised labour mobilisation through a network of intermediaries. However, of late, network driven migration has become more prominent. The Dhanbad–Alappuzha Express is now one of the top ten most crowded trains in India according to a recent report.

=== Bihar ===
Workers from a majority of the districts in Bihar were found in Kerala. Migration from Bihar is predominantly driven by social networks; however, there is also organised labour movement to the construction industry. Large scale construction in Kerala depended heavily on workers from Bihar. Brick kilns in Wayanad, Kollam and Alappuzha also had workers, including families, from Bihar. Plantations in Idukki too had families from Bihar. Binanipuram in Ernakulam district is a residential pocket of migrant workers from Bihar.

=== West Bengal ===
Workers from West Bengal constitute one of the largest proportions of the footloose labour in Kerala. They were available at the labour nakas in all the districts along with workers from Tamil Nadu. The minor construction sector had absorbed a lot of them.A large proportion of the migrants from West Bengal were Muslims. A mason who earned Rs 200 in Murshidabad got Rs 800 and above in Kerala.Families from West Bengal were clustered in various panchayats near Perumbavoor in Ernakulam district and Nelliyampathy in Palakkad district.

=== Assam ===
Migration from Assam to Kerala started in the late nineties as the plywood industry in Assam collapsed in 1996. While the first wave of migrants from Assam constituted predominantly Bengali Muslims with Nagaon as the focal point, the latest wave of migrants includes Hindu and Christian men and women from most of the districts. Migrants from Assam came to work in the plywood industry in Perumbavoor first. Now the plywood sector in Perumbavoor as well as Valapattanam in Kannur engages workers from Assam. Workers from 24 districts in Assam were found working in Kerala during 2016–2017. Unlike Bengali Muslims from Assam who are found in large numbers across several districts in Kerala, single Hindu and Christian men from Lower Assam were found to be the majority in the laterite mining sector. Men from Assam, who never had any previous experience in fishing, worked as deck hands on fishing boats that operated from several harbours. Several migrants from Assam were also engaged as labourers, loading and unloading ice and fish, at various fish landing centres. Men and women from Assam also worked in the hospitality sector across the state. Assamese families were also found working in the plantation sector in Idukki and Wayanad.

== Work setting ==
A 2017 study found four broad employment arrangements for migrant labour in Kerala. While these four categories are not mutually exclusive, they explain the labour dynamics which are distinct. The footloose labourers, not attached to any particular employer, constitute a large proportion of the workers. These workers are free to choose their vocation, the location of employment, and have a reasonable negotiation power over their wages. Though these workers get the highest of the wages for an eight-hour job in Kerala, their chances of getting work every day are highly unpredictable. The daily wages of men for any unskilled job range from Rs 400 to Rs 700. The informal employees, the most common category of workers employed in the industrial sectors in Kerala, are either attached to an enterprise or a contractor, but without any formal agreement. These workers will not be on the official rolls of the company and do not enjoy most of the social security benefits. Their wages are generally lower than the footloose labourers, but they have steady employment. In the case of large scale employment, free accommodation is generally provided by the employer. Workers are usually deployed through a contractor to whom the manufacturer usually assigns the deliverables. Most of the time, the contractor himself/herself is a migrant and payments are usually made on piece rate or flat rate. Informal employees perhaps constitute the majority of the migrant labour in Kerala. A minority among the migrant labourers is also engaged as formal employees who enjoy all the social security benefits at par with the native labourers. Many industries have a handful of such employees who have been working there for years, while the rest are employed informally, directly or through a contractor.

== Issues and challenges ==
Initially the Tamil population used to migrate in large numbers to Kerala but appropriate action by the Tamil Nadu government in providing welfare schemes has called some of them back. Migrants from other states often find it difficult to integrate due to differences in culture and habits language and the local cuisine, which is not to many migrants' tastes due to the presence of coconut oil. Locals also experience problems such as higher rents, which result in many local businesses no longer being viable, while renters cannot afford to pay their rent. In 2016, the Kerala State Planning Board constituted a working group to formulate recommendations for the welfare of migrant workers under the thirteenth five-year plan (2017–2022). It was for the first time in India that a state had set up a Working Group on Labour Migration as part of the five-year plan.

=== Foreign Migrants ===
There is a large number of migrants from Bangladesh, Nepal, Maldives, Indonesia, Kenya, Nigeria, Philippines and Sri Lanka among other countries especially in larger cities like Thiruvananthapuram and Kochi. The government is taking steps following the concern about public hygiene and the scare of insurgents and illegal migrants from Bangladesh finding their way into the state, many of whom apparently follow extremist causes. These workers report Assam or West Bengal as their native states. Presence of men and women is documented in several districts. Trafficking of women from Bangladesh to Kerala was also documented by the police in Kozhikode and Palakkad districts. Settlers from Bangladesh without documents, on the Indian side, particularly from Assam, move to Kerala as the chances of being intercepted as a foreigner are much lesser in Kerala compared to Assam. Presence of Bangladeshi natives in several prisons and a mental hospital was reported. Although in Kerala Nepali men (Gurkhas) had been employed mostly as security personnel, migrants from Nepal are now available across several economic sectors in the state. Some of them even come here with families. The hospitality industry in Kerala engages men and women from Nepal. Women from Nepal work in malls as well as shops. Nepali men have also been found working in several industrial estates in the state. Unlike Bangladeshi citizens, citizens of Nepal do not require visa if they enter India directly from Nepal.

Illegal migrants from Bangladesh have also been arrested in many cases where the migrants, who come under the pretext of being from West Bengal or Assam and as citizens of India. It is estimated that a large number of Bangladeshi illegal immigrants live in Kerala under the pretext of being from West Bengal and the Kerala police has been finding it difficult to identify as they often mingle with migrants from other states and disappear into the crowd. It is estimated that about 20 million (2 crore) citizens of Bangladesh have crossed into India illegally in the last two decades alone. and had even led to events like Assam Movement. In Kerala, this migration happens due to the high wages and quality living conditions.

=== Education ===
The majority of the migrant workers do not have any special skills, while the state's construction, hospitality and retail sectors among other areas demand a skilled work force. The unskilled migrant workers are unable to fill the skill gap. Skill development institutes have been proposed for setup in the state. The poor enrollment of children from migrant families in schools and dipping literacy levels is also a concern in Kerala, which historically boasts the highest literacy rate in India. While a significant number of children of migrant workers had been enrolled in schools across the districts, the number of migrant children not attending schools could also be substantial. Unlike couples from Tamil Nadu who mostly leave their children behind with other family members in their native places to ensure that they attend school, migrant families from most other states have come here with their children.

=== Health and social status ===
Some of the most important issues facing migrant workers include low-quality and illegal housing, which often lacks basic facilities such as bathrooms and kitchens, long work days of up to 10 hours, and long work weeks of up to six or seven days. While migrants form a significant role in Kerala's prosperity, they do not receive much attention from the state government; this is especially important as they are usually not involved in unions and lack knowledge about their rights. Migrants are also often absent from government documents; contracts between migrants and their employers are usually informal and unofficial.

A study conducted in 2013 by the Gulati Institute of Finance and Taxation for the Kerala government has recommended that the government take steps to improve their housing and living conditions. Registration on arrival is also proposed. The report also suggests that the migrant labourers be brought under the ambit of Rashtriya Swasthya Bima Yojana.

There have also been concerns about the working conditions and long working hours of migrant labourers; this issue came to the forefront in regard to the plywood industry in Perumbavoor. The introduction of health cards was also proposed due to diseases being found in migrant workers; these were then eradicated by the state. Because of the introduction of new diseases a proposal to screen all the workers is being made under the "Safe Kerala" campaign.

=== Begging and human trafficking ===
Kerala has the lowest proportion of homeless people in India. Once a rare sight, begging on the streets is on the rise. There have also been reports of child trafficking on the rise with many street children in Kerala from other states. Although Kerala does not have major industries with scope for potential child labour, small-scale industries, particularly based in cottages and quarters, are stealthily engaging children.

=== Crime ===
The rising crime rate, with many crimes being attributed to migrant workers, especially those from the poorer north-eastern states of India, such as Bihar, Assam and West Bengal, has made their acceptance into the local community harder. Perumbavoor and its adjoining areas in the Ernakulam rural area, which features the largest concentration of migrant workers in the state, has earned a prominent place in the state crime map. During the last five years, 1,770 cases were registered in the state in which migrants were accused. Drug trafficking, counterfeiting, and robbery are the major crimes involving migrants, but there were brutal murder cases in which migrants were involved. In an analysis, out of 38 cases of murder reported in Perumbavoor area which has one of the largest number of migrants in the state in the last 5 years, 32 had links to migrant labourers and such a trend is observed in other parts of the state as well with only a few arrests made as the accused often flee the state. 323 cases of crime are registered relating to migrant labour in the Ernakulam rural area alone in the last five years. Kerala government has been trying to alleviate the fears of the local population in regard to this. They are also known to crowd railway stations, such as Thiruvananthapuram Central and Ernakulam Junction, where they are often tied with Tamil robber gangs.

Barely a month after the much publicized Jisha murder case, another migrant worker was accused of robbery and tied to a tree in Kottayam, which resulted in his death. The murder of Nimisha, a college student has put the focus back on Perumbavoor, a migrant hub, two years after the 2016 Jisha murder case.

== See also ==
- Kerala Gulf diaspora
- Ethnic groups in Kerala
- Interstate Migrant Workmen Act 1979
- Illegal immigration to India
- Kerala model
- Labour in India
- Economy of Kerala
- Unemployment in Kerala
