= S. Manikumar =

Former Chief Justice of Kerala High Court

Hon'ble Chief Justice (Retd.) S. Manikumar

Chief Justice of the High Court of Kerala
- In office 11 October 2019 – 23 April 2023
- Nominated by: Ranjan Gogoi
- Appointed by: Ram Nath Kovind
- Preceded by: Hrishikesh Roy

Judge of Madras High Court
- In office 31 July 2006 – 10 October 2019
- Nominated by: Yogesh Kumar Sabharwal
- Appointed by: A. P. J. Abdul Kalam

Personal details
- Born: 24 April 1961 (age 65)
- Education: RMV College, Chennai; Dr. Ambedkar Government Law College, Chennai

S. Manikumar (born 24 April 1961) is a retired Indian judge who served as the Chief Justice of the High Court of Kerala (headquartered at Ernakulam, Kochi). The High Court of Kerala is the highest court in the Indian state of Kerala and in the Union Territory of Lakshadweep.
