= 2020 Bengaluru drug raids =

Indian police operation

Sandalwood drug scandal
- Date: 10 August 2020 – 14 January 2025
- Location: Bengaluru and Mumbai, India
- Cause: Investigation into international MDMA drug racket
- Outcome: Ongoing investigation, multiple arrests, media and political ramifications
- Arrests: 6 (as of 8 September 2020)
- Accused: Ragini Dwivedi, Sanjjanaa Galrani, Viren Khanna, Aditya Alva, Jayaprakash, others
- Charges: Drug possession, drug trafficking, money laundering

On 10 August 2020, members of the Narcotics Control Bureau (NCB) made simultaneous drug raids in Mumbai and Bengaluru relating to an alleged international MDMA (ecstasy) drugs racket. Based on evidence collected during the raids, the NCB arrested three other individuals on 21 August. Police said they had seized ₹2.2 lakh cash and 145 MDMA pills. According to police, one of the accused had a diary allegedly containing the names of 15 celebrities: including reality television personalities, musicians, actors in Kannada cinema and models, who the accused claimed were regular customers. The police claimed these accused were selling their products to affluent sections of Bangalore society. Other searches were made at properties allegedly belonging to major Kannada film stars. In light of the busts, Kannada filmmaker Indrajit Lankesh alleged 15 members of the Sandalwood were involved in the drugs racket, and accordingly gave a statement to the police.

== Arrests ==
As on 8 September 2020, six people were arrested in connection with the case, including two Kannada film actors: Ragini Dwivedi and Sanjjanaa Galrani, and Viren Khanna, a celebrity party organizer, at whose house a police uniform was allegedly found. Children of politicians and other VIPs were also sought by the police in connection with the case, including Aditya Alva, the son of former minister Jeevaraj Alva and brother-in-law of actor Vivek Oberoi, who allegedly rented out his property for parties at which drugs were consumed. An FIR was registered against 12 people allegedly involved in the scandal, including Jayaprakash, a film producer, Dwivedi, Galrani, and Alva. They were suspected of buying drugs from Loum Pepper Samba, an alleged drug peddler from Senegal, Africa. The bail pleas of Dwivedi and Galrani were rejected on 3 November. Bineesh Kodiyeri, son of a Kerala minister, had his house raided on 5 November as part of a money-laundering investigation relating to drug sales in Bangalore.

The story has gained significant media attention and has led to statements from popular actors such as Yash and Shiva Rajkumar. The story also took a political turn, as both the ruling Bharatiya Janata Party (BJP) and opposition Indian National Congress and Janata Dal (Secular) claimed each party was involved with the scandal. The BJP, in particular, sought to distance itself from Dwivedi, who, according to the party, "voluntarily" campaigned in the 2019 Karnataka by-elections for the BJP. The arrest of Kodiyeri had political ramifications in Kerala, where his father, Kodiyeri Balakrishnan, is a CPI-M leader.

== Aftermath ==
On 25 March 2024, the drug case against actress Sanjjana, realtor Shivaprakash and financial manager Adithya Mohan Agarwal was quashed by the Karnataka High Court due to procedural lapses by the police. Later on 14 January 2025, the drug case against Ragini Dwivedi and co-accused Prashant Ranka was also quashed by the Karnataka High Court due to lack of evidence produced by the police.
