= 2025 in Kerala =

- Centuries
- Decades: 2000s; 2010s; 2020s
- See also: List of years in Kerala; History of Kerala

Events in the year 2025 in Kerala.

== Incumbents ==
=== State government ===
Photo	Post	Name
	Governor of Kerala	Rajendra Vishwanath Arlekar
	Chief minister Of Kerala	Pinarayi Vijayan
	Chief Justice of Kerala High Court	Soumen Sen

== Events ==
=== January ===
- 3 January - CBI Special Court Kochi awards Life imprisonment to Communist Party of India (Marxist) workers involved in Periya twin murder of Youth Congress workers.
- 8 January - Controversial business man Boby Chemmannur arrested by Kerala Police following Sexual harassment complaint of Honey Rose.
- 10 January - A self proclaimed saint named Gopan Swamy undergone premature burial in Neyyattinkara. Controversy erupted after his family who claimed that he has attained Samadhi resisted exhumation.
- 15 January - A 15-year-old boy from Thrippunithura, Ernakulam died by suicide after enduring severe bullying and abuse related to his skin color
- 16 January - A youth attacked and massacred his three neighbours in Chendamangalam.
- 20 January - The Additional District Sessions Court in Neyyattinkara has sentenced his girlfriend Greeshma to death in the 2022 Sharon Raj murder case.
- 27 January - Kerala man (Chenthamara) kills first victim’s (2019 Sajitha murder case) Meenakshi Lakshmi (76) and her son Sudhakaran (58), in Nenmara Palakkad district.

=== February ===
- 10 February - ASHA workers strike begins in Thiruvananthapuram.
- 11 February - A junior student of Kottayam Nursing College was brutally attacked by senior students and subjected to ragging.
- 13 February - Three people were killed in an elephant attack during the annual festival at the Manakulangara temple in Kuruvangad near Koyilandy
- 15 February - First in Kerala, a Catholic nun is appointed as medical officer in government hospital.
- 21–22 February – Invest Kerala Global Summit, Grand Hyatt, Kochi
- 24 February – An elderly couple died in a wild elephant attack in Kannur
- 25 February - a native of Venjarammoodu kills 5, including 13-year-old brother
- 28 February - A 15-year-old class 10th student Muhammed Shahabaz, in Kozhikode district died after suffering serious head injuries in a brutal attack by his classmates following an argument during a farewell party.

=== March ===
- 25 March - Kerala Legislative Assembly passed Kerala State Private Universities (Establishment and Regulation) Bill, 2025 that allows establishment of private universities in state.
- 27 March - Foundation stone laid for establishing model township for survivors of 2024 Wayanad landslides.

=== April ===
- 21 April – The State Government declares a three-day state mourning period over the death of Pope Francis.
- 23 April - A dalit woman faced custodial harassment by Kerala Police in Peroorkada over False accusation.
- 26 April - Water Resources Minister Roshy Augustine represented Kerala at Pope Francis's funeral on April 26, 2025.

=== May ===
- 2 May - Prime Minister Narendra Modi officially commissioned the Vizhinjam International Seaport in Thiruvananthapuram
- 19 May - NH-66 collapse collapse in Kooriyad, Malappuram.
- 25 May - A Liberian registered ship MSC Elsa 3 having hazardous cargo sinks off the coast of Kochi triggering concerns of Marine pollution.

=== June ===
- 5 June - Government of Kerala gives administrative sanction for establishing State Institute of Organ and Tissue Transplantation in Chevayur, Kozhikode district for Rs. 643.8 crores.
- 9 June -
  - A Singaporean Cargo ship MV Wan Hai 503 catches fire 44 nautical miles off the coast of Kannur.
  - World's largest container ship MSC Irina docks at Vizhinjam International Seaport Thiruvananthapuram.
- 11 June -
  - University of Calicut includes Vedan's song into the BA (Malayalam) syllabus.
  - The employees of Diya Krishna who raised False accusation found embezzling 69 lakhs from her firm.
- 14 June - An Lockheed Martin F-35 Lightning II belonging to Royal Air Force makes emergency landing in Thiruvananthapuram International Airport and gets stranded.
- 17 June - A forty year old women committed suicide in Pinarayi following Moral policing by Social Democratic Party of India workers.
- 23 June - United Democratic Front wins in the by poll to Nilambur Assembly constituency.
- 25 June - Controversy erupts following Governor of Kerala Rajendra Arlekar using Bharat Mata symbols and RSS motifs in official functions. One such incident in University of Kerala leads to suspension of Registrar.
- 27 June -
  - Controversy surrounding Central Board of Film Certification objection to the title of the movie JSK: Janaki V v/s State of Kerala reaches Kerala High Court.
  - Dr. Haris Chirakkal, Urology department head from Government Medical College, Thiruvananthapuram alleges that critical surgeries are getting postponed due to lack of equipment and apathy from the part of Veena George in Social media.
  - Samastha objects Government decision to introduce Zumba in schools as part of antidrug campaign.

=== July ===
- 3 July - Building collapse in Government Medical College, Kottayam claims life of a bystander.
- 9 July - Kerala High Court cancels the KEAM rank list citing illegality in new standardization method.
- 11 July - Muslim groups protest against Government of Kerala decision to extend school hours citing that it will affect Madrasa classes.
- 15 July - Yemen postpones capital punishment of Nimisha Priya following pursuit of Islamic cleric Kanthapuram Aboobacker Musliyar.
- 17 July - A thirteen year boy dies after being Electrocuted from a 400kv electricity supply line of Kerala State Electricity Board that passed dangerously close to a school building in Thevalakkara, Kollam district.
- 21 July - Former Chief Minister of Kerala and communist leader V. S. Achuthanandan passes away (aged 101)
- 25 July - Govindachami, a convicted rapist in Soumya murder case escape prison from Kannur Central Prison and gets caught from a well in city.
- 26 July - Two Nuns from state arrested in Durg Junction railway station on charges of Forced conversion and Human trafficking following complaint by Bajrang Dal.
- 30 July - Vedan (rapper) arrested by Kerala Police on charges of rape and sexual abuse.

=== August ===
- 3 August Adoor Gopalakrishnan makes controversial remarks against state funding for film directors from Scheduled Castes and Scheduled Tribes during Kerala Film Policy Conclave.
- 6 August - Kerala High Court suspends Toll collection at Paliyekkara Toll in National Highway 544 in Thrissur.
- 10 August - CEO (Kerala) Rathan U Kelkar IAS issues notice to V. S. Sunil Kumar sign a Declaration/Oath under Rule 20(3)(b) of the Registration of Electoral Rules, 1960 in response to voter list fraud allegations raised by him in Thrissur Lok Sabha constituency.
- 12 August - Allegations of Electoral fraud in form of addition of ghost voters into electoral rolls in Thrissur Lok Sabha constituency in 2024 Indian general election.
- 21 August -
  - Rahul Mamkootathil resigns from Indian Youth Congress following allegations of profanity, misconduct and inappropriate behavior from him.
  - Kerala becomes the first fully Digital literate state in India.
- 22 August - B. Gopalakrishnan Bharatiya Janata Party's state vice president claims that they have relocated voters from other state to the electoral rolls in Thrissur for ensuring victory.
- 27 August - Dr. Biju Damodaran's movie Papa Buka becomes Papua New Guinea's first ever Oscar Academy Award entry.
- 31 August - Kozhikode–Wayanad Tunnel Road project inaugurated by Chief Minister of Kerala.

=== September ===
- 10 September - Special Commissioner to Sabarimala Temple reports to Kerala High Court on irregularities of management of gold cladding around Garbhagriha which was donated by Vijay Mallya in 1998.
- 20 September - Global Ayyappa Sangamam held at Pamba.
- 22 September - Hindu nationalist groups conducts Sabarimala Samrakshana Sangamam at Pandalam.
- 23 September -
  - Mohanlal conferred with Dadasaheb Phalke Award.
  - Customs (Preventive) conducted raid titled Operation Numkhor on Dulquer Salmaan, Prithviraj Sukumaran, Amith Chakalakkal seizing vehicles allegedly smuggled to India through Bhutan.

=== October ===
- 6 October - Kerala High Court orders detailed probe on missing gold from Sabarimala.
- 8 October - Enforcement Directorate raids Dulquer Salmaan, Prithviraj Sukumaran etc. in connection with luxury car smuggling case.
- 9 October - Nearly 50 shops burned and damaged due to fire accident at Taliparamba.
- 11 October - Reports emerge that an ED probe on Vivek Kiran, son of Pinarayi Vijayan was frozen in February 2023 due to alleged deal between CPI(M) and BJP.
- 14 October- Kerala High Court directed police protection for a CBSE school after a group stormed St. Rita’s Public School in Palluruthy, demanding that a student be allowed to wear the hijab, prompting the school to close for two days to prevent unrest.
- 22 October -
  - President of India Droupadi Murmu visits Sabarimala Temple.
  - Government Medical College, Kottayam becomes second government hospital after AIIMS, Delhi to do a Lung transplantation and it becomes the only government hospital in country to do three major organ transplant simultaneously.
- 24 October - Government of Kerala enters into MoU with Ministry of Education for implementing Pradhan Mantri Schools for Rising India by agreeing to National Education Policy 2020 after opposing it for three years. CPI a constituent of Pinarayi Vijayan ministry opposes the move.
- 25 October - The football match planned between Argentina and Australia at Jawaharlal Nehru Stadium (Kochi) on 17th Nov along with Lionel Messi's visit to Kerala announced cancelled bringing end to three month long anticipation.
- 28 October -
  - Kerala Government puts implementation of PM SHRI Scheme on hold and sets up a seven member cabinet committee to examine the scheme.
  - Government of Kerala announces that welfare pension will be hiked to Rs. 2000 from 1600.
  - Thrissur Zoological Park Puthur soft launched by Pinarayi Vijayan.
  - Kerala IT Vision 2031 roadmap document released by Pinarayi Vijayan announcing that state aims to generate 5 lakh high value job, Rs. 20,000 crore investments and Rs. 4.5 lakh crore economic output from Information technology by 2031.
- 30 October - K. B. Ganesh Kumar announces that Kerala State Road Transport Corporation is rolling out an Artificial intelligence based scheduling system named Integrated Command and Control Center and six other projects.

=== November ===
- 1 November - Kerala announces that it has eradicated Extreme poverty.
- 4 November - Kerala begins controversial Special Intensive Revision of electoral rolls.
- 8 November - Narendra Modi flags of Vande Bharat Express between Bengaluru and Ernakulam Junction.
- 13 November - Collapse of under construction pillar in Aroor–Thuravoor Elevated Highway kills a driver passing by.
- 14 November - A teacher affiliated with Bharatiya Janata Party convicted in 2020 Palathayi POCSO case.
- 19 November -
  - State Election Commission restores INC leader's name that was illegally removed from Electoral roll following Kerala High Court intervention.
  - Unlawful Activities (Prevention) Act imposed on a mother (who converted to Islam) from Pathanamthitta who along with her partner based in Vembayam persuaded her 16 year old son to join Islamic State.
  - Kerala High Court dismiss UDF's Kozhikode Municipal Corporation mayoral candidate V. M. Vinu's plea to include his name in electoral rolls.
- 20 November - Special Investigation Team arrests A Padmakumar, CPIM leader and former TDB president.
- 21 November - ED conducted raids on P. V. Anvar in connection with PMLA Act offences on Kerala Financial Corporation loan fraud.
- 27 November - Kerala Police charges case of rape and coercion for medical termination of pregnancy cases against Rahul Mamkootathil MLA followed by Look out circular.
- 28 November - Kerala Fire and Rescue Services rescued five people who got stuck 120 ft above mid air in a sky dining facility at Munnar.

=== December ===
- 5 December - A stretch of National Highway 66 under construction collapses near Mylakkadu trapping vehicles including school bus.
- 8 December - Dileep acquitted by Sessions Court in rape and abduction of actress in 2017.
- 13 December - United Democratic Front registers its biggest victory in Kerala local elections in last two decades by leading in Gram panchayat, Block Panchayats, District Panchayat and Urban Local Bodies.
- 2 December - The Special Intensive Revision exercise in Kerala reveals ASD (absent shifted deceased) percentages in Bharatiya Janata Party strongholds rising speculations about Electoral fraud.
- 23 December - Two airlines including Kerala based Al Hind Air receives NOC from Ministry of Civil Aviation.
- 31 December - Church of South India priest from Trivandrum arrested in Nagpur on charges of Religious conversion.

=== Other major events/ dates unknown ===
- State reports 69 cases of Primary amoebic meningoencephalitis and 19 deaths due to it.
- DPR for establishing a biological park and tiger safari in Perambra Estate in Kozhikode district completed.

== Deaths ==
=== January - May ===
- January 1 – K. S. Manilal, botanist
- January 9 - P. Jayachandran, Indian playback singer
- January 26 - Shafi (director), Indian film director
- April 26 - M. G. S. Narayanan, historian

=== June - August ===
- June 6 - Thennala Balakrishna Pillai, politician (b.1930).
- July 16 - C. V. Padmarajan, politician (b.1931)
- July 21 - V. S. Achuthanandan Indian politician, former Chief Minister of Kerala and communist leader (aged 101)
- August 1 - Kalabhavan Navas, Indian actor, comedian and mimic. (b. 1974)
- December 20 - Sreenivasan, Indian actor, director, screenplay writer.

== See also ==
- 2025 in India
- Vaikom Satyagraha
- History of Kerala
