= 2026 in Kerala =

- Centuries
- Decades: 2000s; 2010s; 2020s
- See also: List of years in Kerala; History of Kerala

Events in the year 2026 in Kerala, India.

== Incumbents ==
=== State government ===
Photo	Post	Name
	Governor of Kerala	Rajendra Vishwanath Arlekar
	Chief Minister of Kerala	V. D. Satheesan
	Chief Justice of Kerala High Court	Nitin Madhukar Jamdar
	Chief Justice of Kerala High Court	Soumen Sen

== Events ==
=== January ===
- 1 January – Government of Kerala starts Navakeralam Citizens Response Program to collect feedback from citizens to plan future developments in the state.
- 3 January – Former Minister and sitting MLA Antony Raju gets three year imprisonment on Evidence tampering case.
- 8 January – Controversy erupts following issuance of stop memo by revenue authorities invoking Kerala River Protection Act 2001 on Maha Magha Festival planned to conduct by Hindu groups at Thirunavaya Navamukunda Temple.
- 9 January – Kantararu Rajeevaru of Thazhamon Madom, the Thantri family of Sabarimala Temple arrested by SIT in connection with the temple gold theft case.
- 11 January – Rahul Mamkootathil is arrested and remanded to Mavelikkara subjail in connection with a sexual assault case.
- 12 January – Protests against toll gate at Arikady in Kasaragod on NH 66.
- 13 January – P. Aisha Potty leaves Communist Party of India (Marxist) and joins Indian National Congress.
- 18 January – Juna Akhara and Amrita Trust conducts a Kumbh Mela at Thirunavaya Navamukunda Temple.
- 23 January – Senior Communist Party of India (Marxist) leader from Kannur, V Kunhikrishnan alleges about misappropriation of martyr's fund by party members.
- 28 January – Kerala Cabinet approves Regional Rapid Transit System between Kasaragod and Thiruvananthapuram.
- 30 January – CJ Roy CEO of Confident Group committed suicide during an Income Tax raid.

=== February ===
- 8 February – Services defeats Kerala in the final of Santosh Trophy.
- 21 February –
  - Election Commission of India finishes Special Intensive Revision in Kerala removing 9 lakh voters from Electoral roll.
  - Amrita Institute of Medical Sciences removes Artery forcep left in a women abdomen five years back during a surgery at Government TD Medical College, Alappuzha.
- 24 February – Union cabinet approve change of state's name from Kerala to Keralam.
- 25 February – Veena George claims to be injured following a Kerala Students' Union protest against her at Kannur.
- 26 February – Kerala High Court stays release of The Kerala Story 2 Goes Beyond.

=== March ===
- 7 March –
  - Pinarayi Vijayan inaugurates the Perumbalam Bridge.
  - Mammootty faces Cyberbullying from Communist Party of India (Marxist) cadres following his remarks made to a party worker on visit to Wayanad township.
- 8 March – India national cricket team won the Men's T20 World Cup and Sanju Samson becomes the player of the tournament.
- 9 March –
  - The wife of Minister K. B. Ganesh Kumar raises allegation of sexual misconduct against him.
  - United Nurses Association begins nurses strike across various districts of state in private hospitals.
- 10 March – Kerala High Court dismissed plea on grounds of Digital Personal Data Protection Act, 2023 filed against Second Vijayan ministry for using personal data of government employees for Bulk messaging.
- 11 March – Fuel gas shortage in Kerala due to 2026 Iran war more than 20% of restaurants in state stay closed.
- 12 March –
  - Kerala High Court orders removal of Vellappally Natesan from Sree Narayana Dharma Paripalana Yogam general secretary post.
  - G. Sudhakaran leaves Communist Party of India (Marxist) and announced that he is going to contest Ambalappuzha Assembly constituency as an Independent candidate United Democratic Front (Kerala) promises support.
  - Internet personality who shot to fame during Kumbh Mela, Monalisa Bhosle did Interfaith marriage at Poovar at the time when her age was not legal to marry in India and that leads to filing of a legal case under POSCO act, the controversy has been fuelled by claims of “love jihad,” .
- 22 March - V. D. Satheesan alleges deal between Bharatiya Janata Party and Communist Party of India (Marxist) in upcoming polls.

=== April ===
- 5 April -
  - Bharatiya Janata Party leader caught for electoral malpractice in Vadanappally for distributing kits to voters for votes.
  - A women trekker from Kozhikode who was lost in Tadiandamol rescued.
- 8 April -
  - Case filed against Sobha Surendran for distributing cash to voters for votes.
  - Pinarayi Vijayan responds to Revanth Reddy using derogatory remarks and invites criticism from the Congress leaders.
- 9 April - 2026 Kerala Legislative Assembly election
- 10 April -
  - A first year Bachelor of Dental Science student committed suicide in Kannur Medical College, Anjarakandy following Caste discrimination by faculty.
  - A fifteen year old girl from Palakkad who was lost during a trek at Chikmagalur found dead.
- 21 April -
  - A massive explosion at a fireworks manufacturing unit in Mundathikkode, Thrissur, resulted in at least 13 fatalities and over 40 injuries

=== May ===
- 4 May – Results of Assembly elections in Kerala are declared and United Democratic Front (Kerala) earns a decisive victory.
- 10 May - Kerala Police bust an Organ trade racket in Kochi.
- 14 May - Indian National Congress selects V. D. Satheesan as the Chief Minister of Kerala after a ten day long uncertainty and contestations from K. C. Venugopal and Ramesh Chennithala.
- 27 May - Enforcement Directorate raids residence of Pinarayi Vijayan in connection with Cochin Minerals and Rutile Limited bribe case and Communist Party of India (Marxist) workers the ED officials.
- 29 May - A toddler named Arshith killed in Nedumangad by step father after inhumane torture.

=== June ===
- 1 June - Lok Bhavan appoints Mavoothu Duraipandi as the Vice-Chancellor in-charge of Mahatma Gandhi University.
- 2 June
  - Shanimol Osman gets elected as the Deputy Speaker of the Kerala Legislative Assembly.
  - The Left Democratic Front (LDF) walks out of Kerala Legislative Assembly after accusing the government of neglecting fuel crisis.
  - The government of Kerala appoints Indian Administrative Service (IAS) officer Seeram Sambasiva Rao as the new Excise Commissioner.
  - Kerala Police and Satheesan ministry launches Operation Toofan to curb drug menace in the state.
- 3 June
  - LDF walks out of Kerala Legislative Assembly after accusing the government of implementing mass transfers of government employees in an unfair manner.
  - The Special Investigation Team (SIT) investigating the attack of Youth Congress workers at Alappuzha in November 2023 reveals law enforcement's efforts to shield former Kerala Chief Minister Pinarayi Vijayan's security detail from prosecution.
- 15 June - Government of Kerala launches free travel for women and transgenders in Kerala State Road Transport Corporation buses as part of Priyadarshini Scheme.
- 29 June
  - LDF marks protest in Kerala Legislative Assembly over the non-disbursal of monthly pension for unemployed women as well as transwomen under the Sthree Suraksha Scheme.
  - The SIT investigating the gold theft at Sabarimala temple submits its detailed investigation report before the Kerala High Court. The court permits the SIT to register a fresh case as the investigation report mentions criminal conspiracy by Travancore Devaswom Board (TDB) officials including its former president P. S. Prasanth.
  - The High Court of Kerala dismisses the bail plea of Prasobh Valsan, former Congress councillor of Palakkad municipality, in the alleged rape of a Dalit woman.
  - Chempazhanthy Udayan, a Bharatiya Janata Party councillor and Education Standing Committee chairperson of Thiruvananthapuram Corporation attacks three congress councillors including K. S. Sabarinadhan.
- 30 June
  - LDF walks out of the Kerala Legislative Assembly after Speaker Thiruvanchoor Radhakrishnan disallows its notice for an adjournment motion on the alleged failure of the government to endure the timely disbursal of relief to the fishing community which has been facing difficulties due to trawling ban.
  - Kerala Legislative Assembly passes a resolution urging the Centre to take effective measures to comprehensively reform the national entrance examination system.
  - Chittur MLA Sumesh Achuthan alleges corruption in Attappady hybrid wind-solar project and seeks comprehensive investigation into the project and other schemes implemented by Agency for New and Renewable Energy Research and Technology (ANERT).
  - Mediterranean Shipping Company (MSC) acquires 49% stake in Vizhinjam International Seaport Thiruvananthapuram for over ₹13,000 crore (US$1.3 billion).

=== July ===
- 1 July
  - LDF walks out of the Kerala Legislative Assembly after Speaker Thiruvanchoor Radhakrishnan disallows its notice for an adjournment motion on the reduction of funds for local bodies in the Revised Budget for 2026-27.
  - Chief Minister V. D. Satheesan informs the Kerala Legislative Assembly that Adani Ports & SEZ has not obtained the approval for the transfer of shares in MSC-Adani agreement.
  - Kerala Legislative Assembly passes Finance Bill amid a boycott by the LDF.
- 3 July
  - The High Court of Kerala dismisses a public interest litigation (PIL) seeking an investigation by the Central Bureau of Investigation (CBI) into the attack on Enforcement Directorate (ED) officials after a raid on former Chief Minister Pinarayi Vijayan's residence in Thiruvananthapuram.
- 4 July
  - The government of Kerala launches Dakshayani, a scheme aimed at promoting entrepreneurship and economic empowerment among women belonging to the Scheduled Castes and Scheduled Tribes.
  - CPI(M) alleges that the recent removal of IAS officer Divya S. Iyer as the Managing Director of Vizhinjal International Seaport was aimed at improving the Adani Group.
  - Kerala Kaumudi reports that there has been no significant investigation into the gold theft at Sabarimala Temple by the Enforcement Directorate for the past four months.

=== August ===
- 11 August - Lok Sabha passes Kerala (Alteration of Name) Bill, 2026 changing name of Kerala to Keralam.
- 18 August - Enforcement Directorate raids eight locations in Kozhikode in connection with CMRL-Exalogic bribery case.
- 21 August - Indian Railways notifies shifting of Mangaluru from Palakkad railway division to Mysore railway division from October 1.

=== October ===
- 3 October - Authorities announce that sanitary napkin vending machines and disposal units will be installed in public areas.

== Deaths ==
- 9 Mar - K. N. Panikkar, Historian, (b.1936)

== See also ==
- History of Kerala
- 2026 in India
- Timeline of Kerala
