= Thrissur Zoo =

Zoo in Thrissur, Kerala, India

State Museum & Zoo, Thrissur
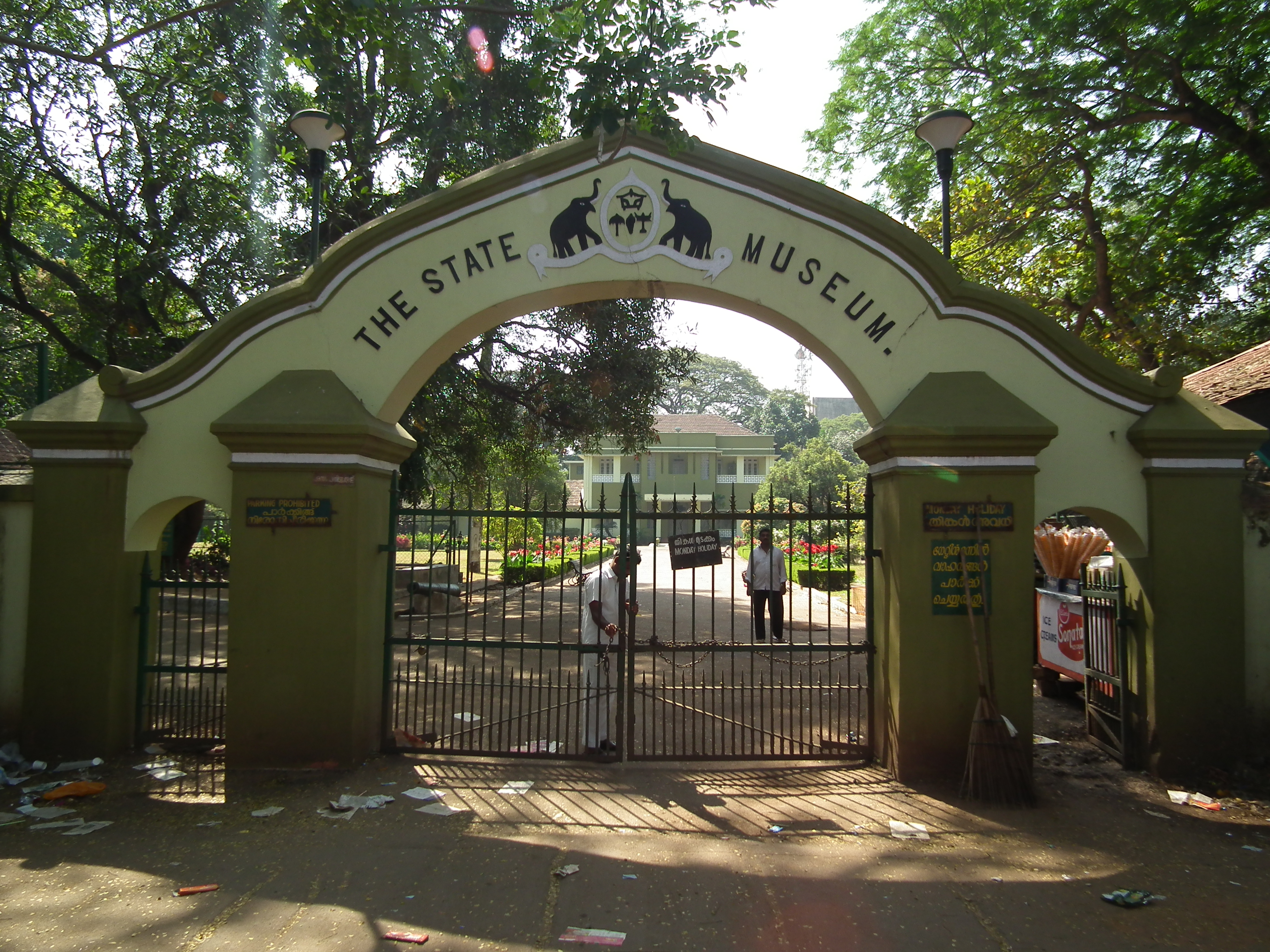
- Entrance of Thrissur Zoo
- Interactive map of State Museum & Zoo, Thrissur
- 10.529965°N 76.2227529°E
- Date opened: 1885
- Location: Thrissur, Kerala, India
- Land area: 13.5 acres (5.5 ha)
- Annual visitors: 2,000 (Per day)
- Memberships: CZA
- Major exhibits: Wildlife
- Website: www.keralamuseumandzoo.org

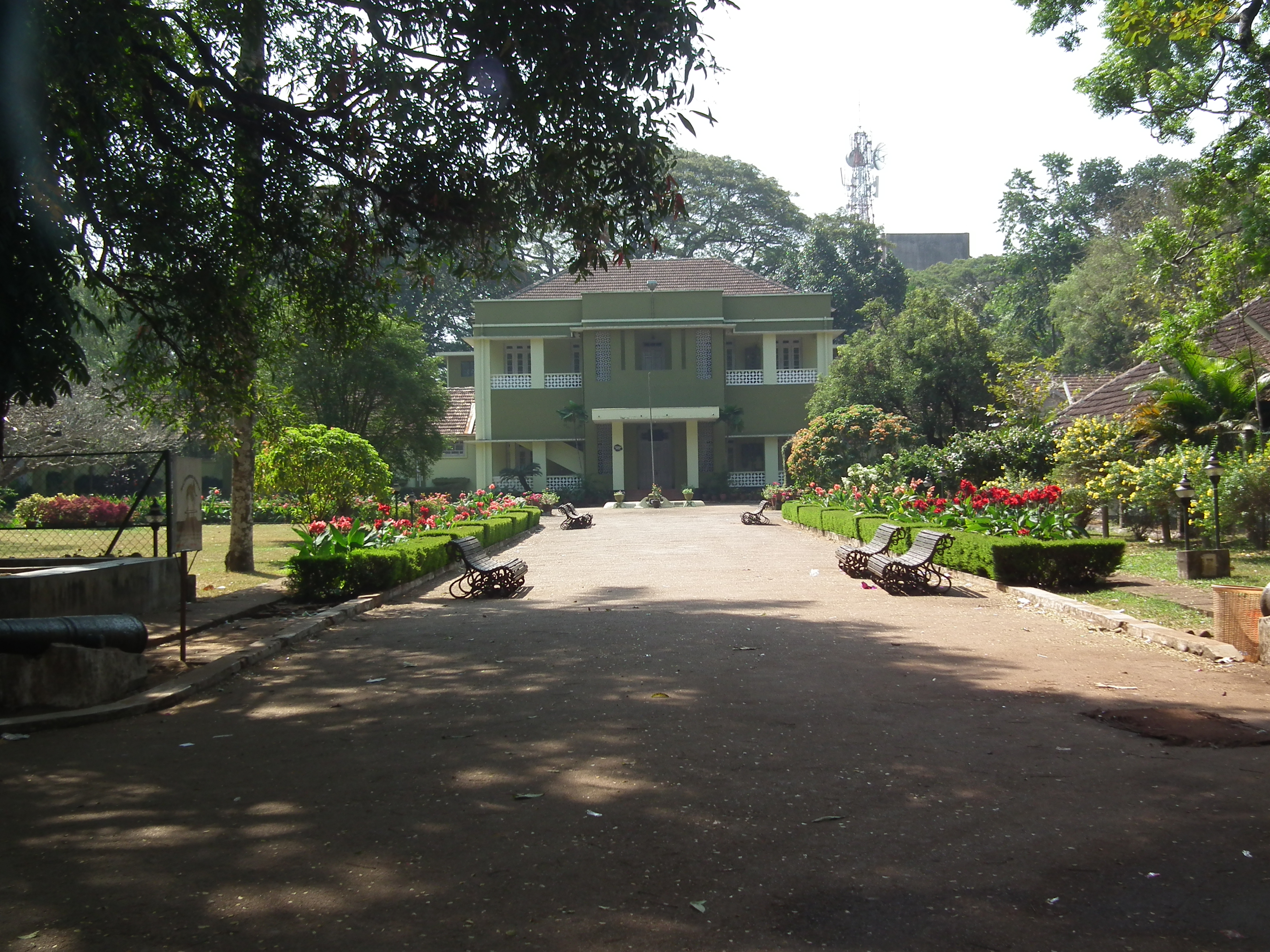
State Museum building inside the Zoo compound

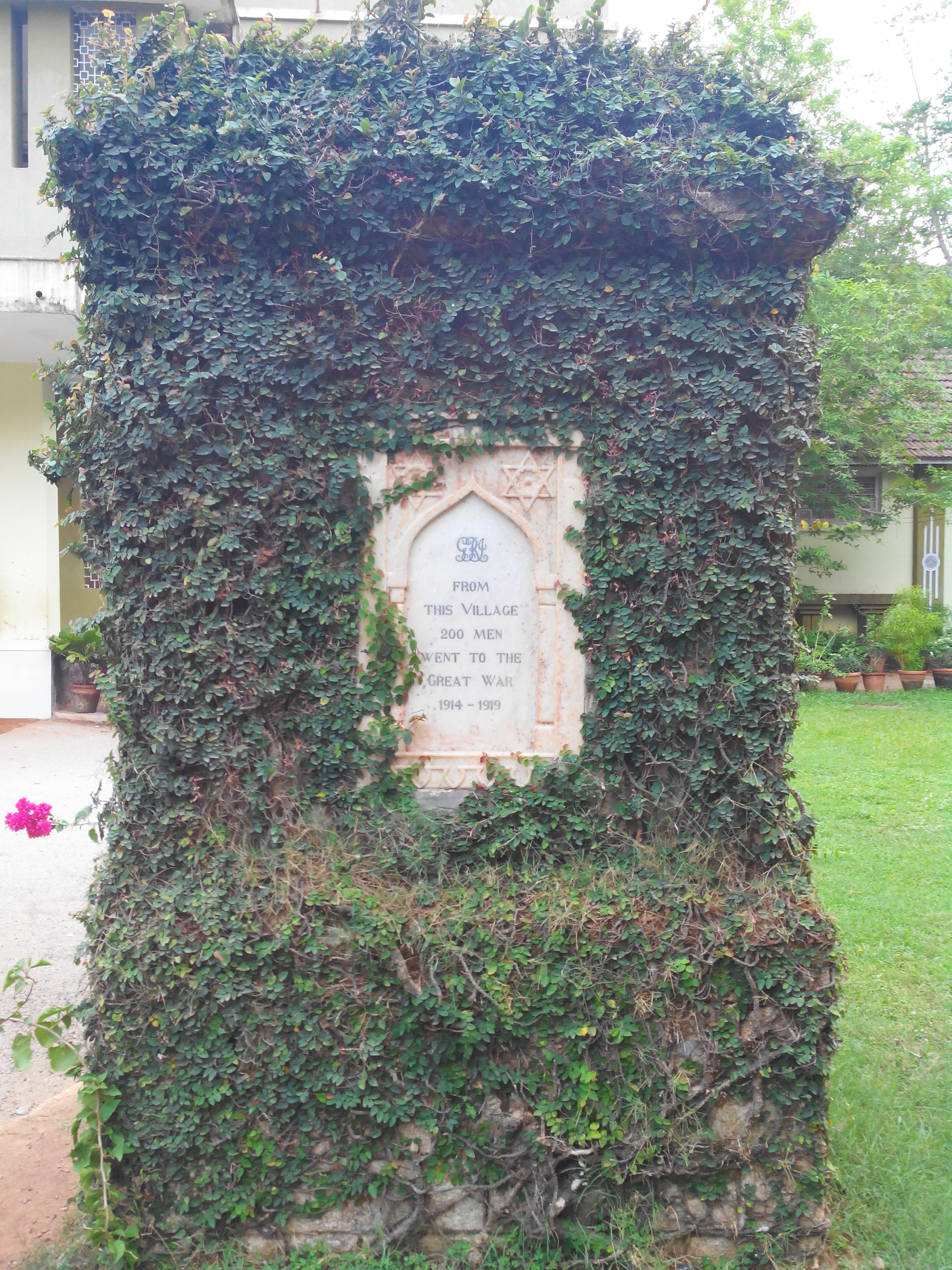
War Monument in front of state museum inside the Zoo compound

Thrissur Zoo or State Museum & Zoo, Thrissur (formerly the Trichur Zoo) is a 13.5-acre (5.5 ha) zoo that opened in 1885 in a small area called Chembukkavu, in the heart of Thrissur City, Kerala, India. It is one of the oldest zoos in the country and is home to a wide variety of animals, reptiles, and birds. The zoo compound includes a natural history museum and an art museum that showcase the social and cultural heritage of the region. The Thrissur Zoo is 2 kilometres (1.2 mi) from the Thrissur City center and is open from 10:00 AM to 5:15 PM, except on Mondays. Being one of the two Zoological Parks in the state of Kerala, it sees many visitors regularly. Still and video cameras are allowed in the park for a small fee.

== Exhibits ==
The zoo includes a Zoological Garden, Botanical Garden, Art Museum, and Natural History Museum in its compound.

== Future plans ==
The Thrissur Zoological Park Wildlife Conservation & Research Centre is being constructed in nearby Puthur and will expand the size of the zoo from its current 13.5 acres (5.5 ha) to 306 acres (124 ha). The new zoo will be close to the Peechi Dam, Kerala Forest Research Institute, Kerala Agricultural University, College of Forestry, and College of Veterinary and Animal Sciences.

== Gallery ==
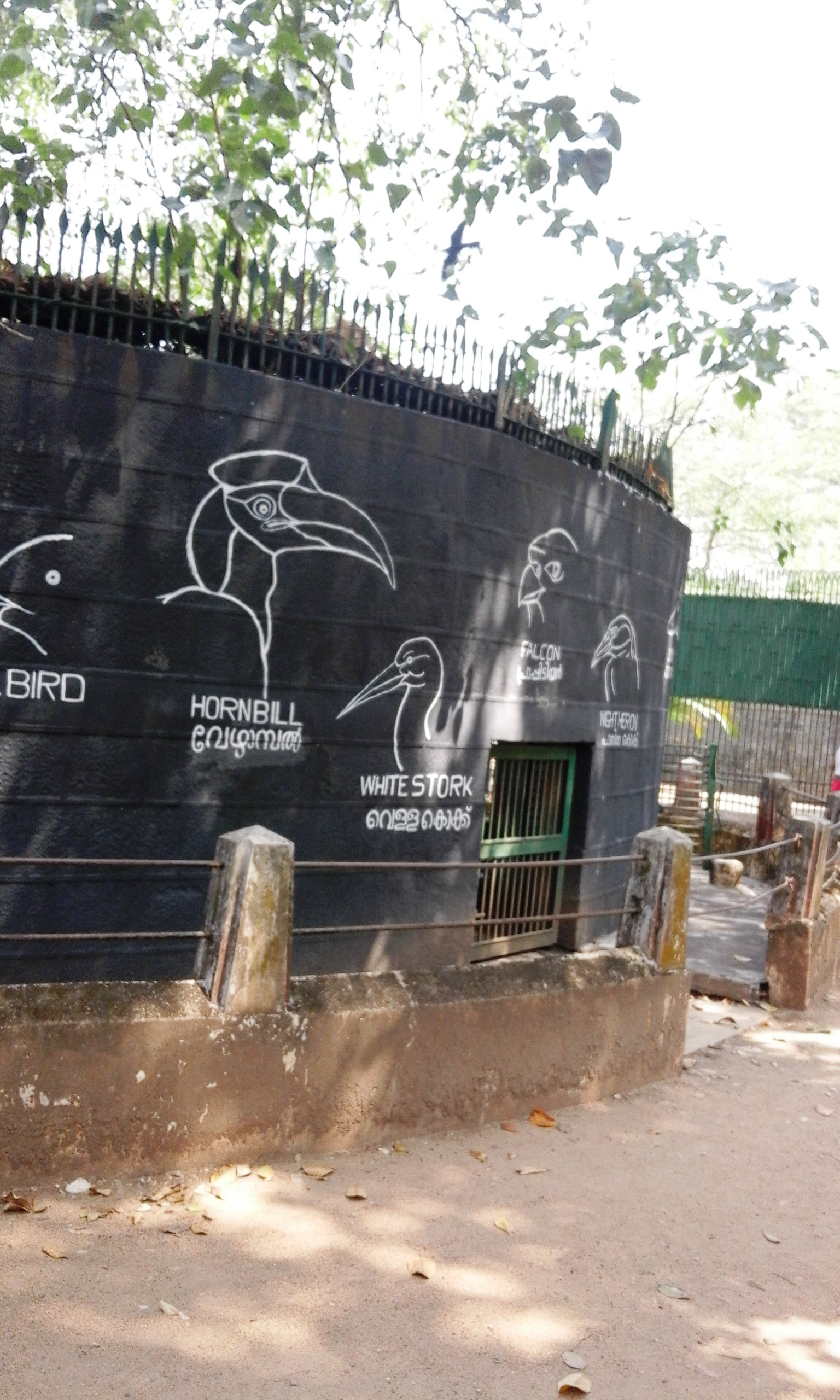
Murals

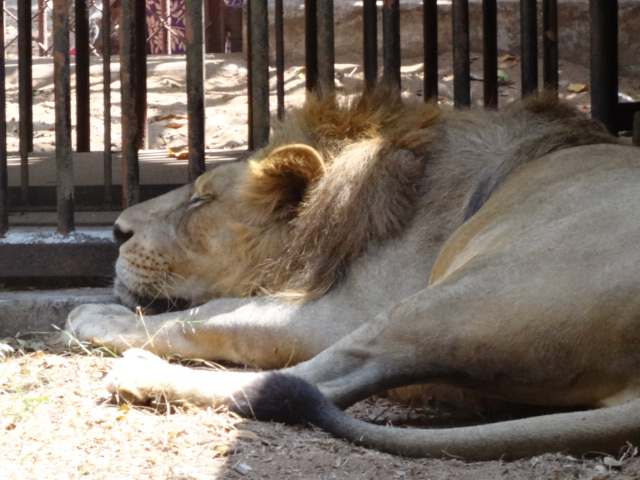
Asiatic lion

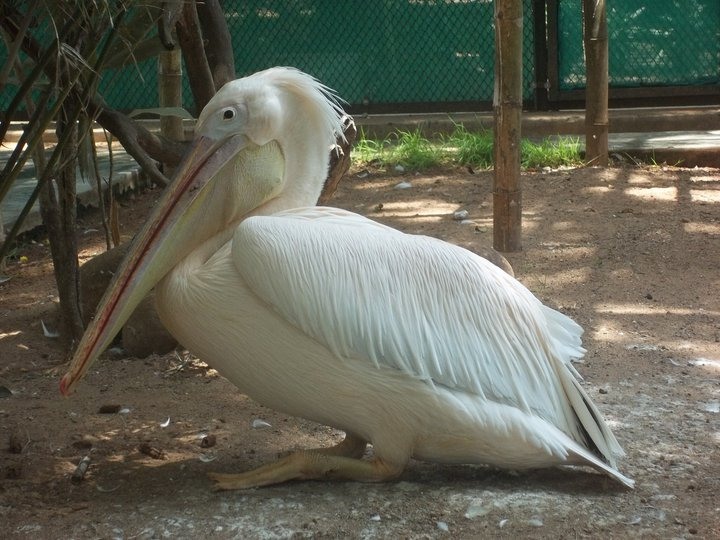
Pink-backed pelican

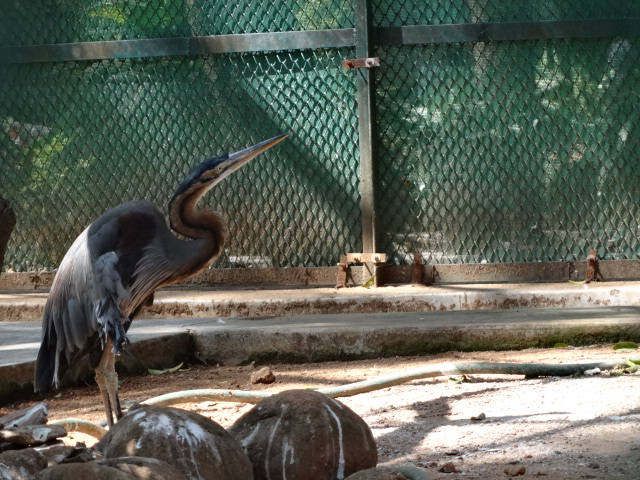
Purple heron

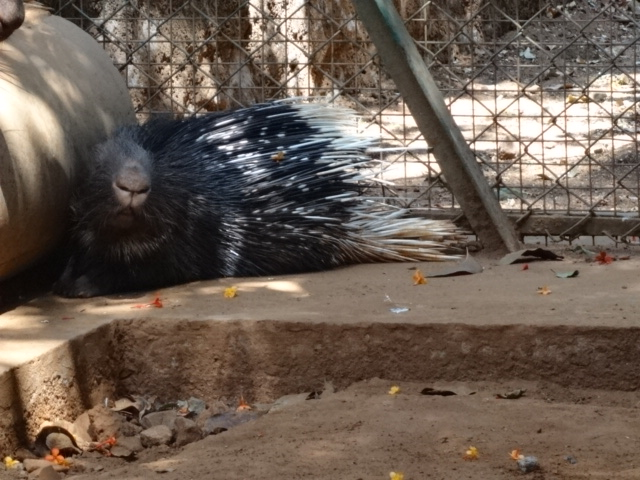
Indian crested porcupine

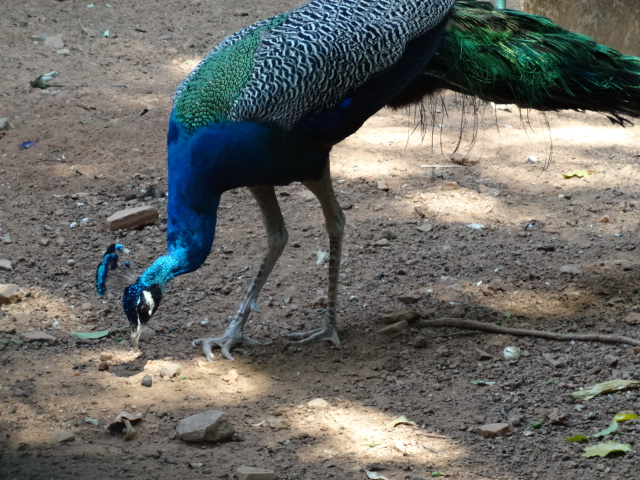
Indian peafowl

== See also ==
- Thrissur Zoological Park Wildlife Conversation & Research Centre
