= Cochin Minerals and Rutile Limited =

Indian chemicals company

Cochin Minerals and Rutile Limited (CMRL)
- Type: Public
- Traded as: BSE: 513353
- Industry: Chemicals
- Founded: 18 August 1989
- Headquarters: Edayar Industrial Development Area, Aluva, Kochi, India
- Key people: R.K. Garg, Chairman . Dr.S.N. Sasidharan Kartha, MD
- Products: Beneficiated Ilmenite (Synthetic Rutile), Ferric Chloride, Ferrous Chloride, Cemox
- Revenue: ▲₹1,129 million (US$12 million) (2009-2010)
- Operating income: ▲₹15.32 crore (US$1.6 million) (2009-2010)
- Net income: ▲₹5.89 crore (US$610,000) (2009-2010)
- Total assets: ₹601 million (US$6.2 million) (2009-2010)
- Total equity: ₹78.3 million (US$810,000) (2009-2010)
- Website: www.cmrlindia.com

Cochin Minerals and Rutile Limited (CMRL) (BSE: 513353) is a publicly listed chemicals company based in Kochi, Kerala, India. The company was founded in 1989 by Dr. S.N. Sasidharan Kartha with assistance from the Kerala State Industrial Development Corporation (KSIDC). The company is the only listed Indian entity in the synthetic rutile space.

== Plant location ==
- Aluva (Kerala) - The plant is located at Edayar Industrial Development Area, which is about 15 kilometers from the Cochin Port and 100 kilometers from the Ilmenite deposits. The company started production with a capacity of 10000 TPA of Synthetic Rutile and 12500 TPA of Ferric Chloride. Subsequent, the company enhanced its production capacity of Synthetic Rutile to 45000 TPA, Ferric Chloride to 24000 TPA, Ferrous Chloride to 72000 TPA and Cemox to 18000 TPA.

== Product range ==
- Beneficiated Ilmenite (Synthetic Rutile)
- Ferric Chloride
- Ferrous Chloride

== Controversies ==
- In a raid conducted by Income Tax Department in 2019, it was revealed that the company inflates its expenses and pay bribes to several politicians in Kerala.
- In 2018 - 19 there were protest named Save Alappad in Kollam district against alleged illegal mining carried out under the aegis of CMRL.
- In June 2023, Income Tax Interim Settlement Board, Delhi ruled that the company paid illegal payments to daughter of Pinarayi Vijayan by giving bogus contracts to her company Exalogics.
- In February 2024, Serious Fraud Investigation Office conducted probe against the company over alleged deal with Veena Vijayan.

== See also ==
- V V Minerals
- Indian Rare Earths
- KMML
