= Kerala Fire and Rescue Services Academy =

Fire training institute in Kerala, India

- കേരള ഫയര്‍ ആന്‍റ് റെസ്ക്യൂ സര്‍വ്വീസസ് അക്കാദമി

Academy overview
- Formed: 4 June 2007
- Jurisdiction: State of Kerala
- Headquarters: Thrissur city
- Academy executives: M. Nousad, Director (Technical); M G Rajesh, RFO
- Parent department: Kerala Fire and Rescue Services

Kerala Fire and Rescue Services Academy (Malayalam:കേരള ഫയര്‍ ആന്‍റ് റെസ്ക്യൂ സര്‍വ്വീസസ് അക്കാദമി) is situated in Ramavarmapuram in Thrissur city, Kerala of India. The academy is the official fire training institution for the Kerala Fire And Rescue Services.

== History ==
Earlier, Fort Kochi based institute trained firemen for the Kerala Fire Department. On 4 June 2007, the then Chief Minister of Kerala V. S. Achuthanandan inaugurated the new academy. The academy is situated near the Central Prison, Viyyur in eight acres of land. Training for new firemen was started on 22 October 2007. The first batch of 225 fireman-driver-cum-pump operators passed out on 4 July 2013.

== Courses ==
The academy offers basic training for Fire and Rescue Officer, Fire and Rescue Officer(Driver) and inservice courses of Senior Fire and Rescue Officer, Senior Fire and Rescue Officer (Mechanic) and Assistant Station Officer. In addition, practical courses are also available at the academy. The academy can train and accommodate 350 trainees in the institute and the hostel. An Olympic type swimming pool exists for training purposes at the academy.
