= Invest Kerala Global Summit =

Economy of Kerala

- Host country: India
- Date: 21–22 February 2025
- Cities: Kochi, Kerala
- Venues: Lulu Bolgatty International Convention Centre, Kochi
- Chair: Government of Kerala
- Website: invest.kerala.gov.in

Invest Kerala Global Summit is a major event organized by the Government of Kerala in India to attract domestic and international investments across various sectors, aiming to showcase the state's potential as a business hub and promote economic growth; it is hosted by the Kerala State Industrial Development Corporation (KSIDC). The event brings together business leaders, investors, corporations, policy makers, and thought leaders. The summit serves as a platform to discuss and explore business opportunities in Kerala.

== Event ==
The Invest Kerala Global Summit 2025 commenced on February 21, 2025, at the Lulu International Convention Centre in Kochi. The event was inaugurated by Chief Minister of Kerala Pinarayi Vijayan, who emphasized the state's commitment to creating an investor-friendly environment by simplifying procedures and eliminating bureaucratic hurdles. In a notable display of political unity, Leader of Opposition V D Satheesan expressed the opposition's support for the state's investment initiatives, highlighting a collective goal of propelling Kerala toward economic prosperity and industrial excellence. The Union government also extended its support, with Union Minister Nitin Gadkari announcing 31 upcoming road projects in Kerala, totaling 896 kilometers and costing ₹50,000 crore. These infrastructure developments aim to enhance connectivity and attract further investments to the state. The summit has attracted over 3,000 delegates from various sectors, underscoring Kerala's potential as a prime investment destination.

== Sessions ==
- Nurturing the Future of Startups and Innovation
- Future of Talent
- Global Gateway to Medical Excellence, Ayurveda and Wellness Tourism
- Harnessing Marine Sector for Future Growth
- Powering the Future of Automotive Technology Innovation
- Catalyzing Growth: Port-Led Development as a Bridge to Global Trade
- Kerala Towards $1 Trillion Economy
- Navigating the Future: Shipbuilding Potential in India’s Maritime Growth
- Roots of Prosperity: Nurturing Kerala’s Traditional Sectors for a Brighter Future
- Empowering Kerala’s Future: Unleashing Opportunities in Clean, Sustainable Energy
- Value-added Plantation Sector Including Rubber

== Key Sectors ==
The Invest Kerala Global Summit 2025 focuses on 22 key sectors for investment and development.

- Aerospace & Defence
- Agri & Food Processing
- Animation, Gaming & Entertainment
- Automobile & Electric Vehicles
- Banking, Financial Services & Insurance (BFSI)
- Biotechnology & Life Sciences
- Chemical & Petrochemicals
- E-commerce & Retail
- Education & Skill Development
- Electronics & Semiconductors
- Energy & Green Hydrogen
- Environment & Sustainability
- Healthcare & Medical Devices
- Industrial & Engineering Manufacturing
- Infrastructure & Real Estate
- IT & Emerging Technologies
- Logistics & Warehousing
- Media & Film Production
- Pharmaceuticals
- Ports & Shipping
- Textiles & Apparel
- Tourism & Hospitality

== Outcome ==
The Invest Kerala Global Summit 2025, held on February 21 and 22 at the Lulu International Convention Centre in Kochi, was a significant event aimed at attracting both domestic and international investments to the state. Organized by the Kerala State Industrial Development Corporation (KSIDC) under the Department of Industry and Commerce, the summit focused on fostering economic growth while preserving Kerala's natural and cultural heritage. The event witnessed participation from over 3,000 delegates, including global industry leaders, policymakers, entrepreneurs, and prospective investors from 26 countries. Key sessions covered topics such as startup innovation, talent development, wellness tourism, marine sector growth, automotive technology, and sustainable energy.

A notable outcome of the summit was the receipt of investment proposals totaling approximately ₹1.53 lakh crore across various sectors. Significant commitments included ₹30,000 crore from Karan Adani, ₹10,000 crore from HiLITE Group, and ₹5,000 crore each from LuLu Group International, Monarch Surveyors and Engineering Consultants Ltd, Sharaf Group, and Tofl Pathanamthitta Infra Ltd. Additionally, 24 IT companies expressed interest in expanding operations in Kerala, proposing an investment of nearly ₹8,500 crore and the creation of 60,000 jobs.

To ensure the swift realization of these investments, the Kerala government announced the establishment of a fast-track mechanism, including a dashboard-based online system, a dedicated toll-free number for investors, and periodic reviews by a committee chaired by the chief secretary. Furthermore, the Invest Kerala Global Summit is set to become a triennial event, with the next edition scheduled for 2028.

== See also ==
- Economy of Kerala
- Kerala Startup Mission
- Kerala Industrial Infrastructure Development Corporation
