= Kerala Fire and Rescue Services =

Fire department in Kerala, India

- Emblem of Kerala Fire and Rescue Services

Operational area
- Country: India
- State: Kerala
- Address: Fire and Rescue Services HQ, Fire Force Junction, Pulimood P.O. Thiruvananthapuram-695001

Agency overview
- Established: 1963; 63 years ago
- Annual calls: -
- Employees: 4900 (Executive); 200 (Ministerial staffs)
- Annual budget: ₹442.37 crore (US$46 million) (2026–27, revised)
- Staffing: Career members and volunteers
- Director General: ADGP Balramkumar Upadya IPS
- Director (Technical): Noushad.M
- Director (Administration): Arun Alphonse
- Motto: "We serve to Save"

Facilities and equipment
- Divisions: Regional offices (6): Thiruvananthapuram; Kottayam; Ernakulam; Palakkad; Kozhikode; Kannur
- District Fire Offices: 14
- Academy: Kerala Fire and Rescue Services Academy, Thrissur; Institute for Advanced Training in Water Rescue, Fort Kochi
- Stations: 129
- Engines: 500
- Ambulances: -
- Volunteer units: Kerala Homeguards; Kerala Civil Defence
- Parent department: Home Department, Government of Kerala

Website
- Official website

The Kerala Fire and Rescue Services, formerly known as Kerala Fire Force, is the service department of the Government of Kerala whose function is to fight fires and provide relief measures in times of calamities and disasters in Kerala. The Headquarters of the department is situated at Thiruvananthapuram. "WE SERVE TO SAVE" is the motto of the department. The current Director General of Fire and Rescue Services (Fire Chief) of Kerala is Balramkumar Upadya IPS.

It is responsible for the provision of fire protection as well as responding to building collapses, drownings, gas leakage, oil spillage, road and rail accidents, bird and animal rescues, fallen trees and taking appropriate action during natural disasters. The department has now 129 Fire and Rescue stations, a Training Academy and an Institute of Advanced Water Rescue Training Centre consisting of nearly 4800 executive personnel and nearly 200 ministerial staff.

== History ==
There were separate Fire services in Travancore, Cochin and Malabar States before the formation of Kerala State. There were three fire stations in Travancore and Kochi and five fire stations in Malabar. These stations were under the control of Police Department. In 1949, the Fire Station of Travancore and Cochin states were joined together. In 1956, Malabar state was also included and thus the Kerala Fire Service came into being. From then onwards, the Inspector General of Police was the head of the Fire Service up to 1963. Fire services worked as part of the Police Department. As per the notification of The Kerala Government in 1962, Kerala Fire Force Act came into existence.

The Kerala Fire Force department started working as a separate department since 1963. Director of Civil Defence held the position of the Head of the Department till 1967. From 1967 to August 1970 an Inspector General of Police held the charge of the Director for Fire Force. In 1970 the Fire Force Department was brought under a separate Director. In 1982 the name of the Director of Fire Force was renamed as Commandant General, Home Guards, Civil Defence and Fire Force. Considering the rescue works under taken by this Department and significance in that area, this department had been renamed as Kerala Fire & Rescue Services in 2002. Now the Department is rendering its remarkable and commendable service through 129 Fire & Rescue Stations. In 2015 the name of the Commandant General was renamed as Director General, Fire and Rescue, Home Guards and Civil Defence. There are 14 District Offices and 6 Regional Offices in Thiruvananthapuram, Kottayam, Ernakulam, Palakkad Kozhikode and Kannur and one regional Fire Officer in the post of Director and three district Fire Officers in the post of Assistant Director in the Kerala Fire and Rescue Services Academy. The Motor Transport wing was established in Headquarters, Academy and six Regional offices. The Department is in a stage of modernisation and development so as to provide better service to the public in all emergency situations.

== Organisation structure ==
The Kerala Fire and Rescue Services functions under the administrative control of the Home Department, Government of Kerala. Ramesh Chennithala, Minister for Home, also holds the Fire and Rescue Services portfolio and is the minister responsible for the department.

The head of the department is the Director General (D.G.), an IPS cadre officer with the rank of Director General of Police. Under the Director General, there are the Director (Technical) and the Director (Administration) at the headquarters. There are six Regional Offices consisting of two or three districts, located in Thiruvananthapuram, Kottayam, Ernakulam, Palakkad, Kozhikode and Kannur where Regional Officers are in charge. Each district has a District Fire Office and under each District Fire Officer there are Fire & Rescue Stations where a Station Officer as the station in charge.

At each station, in addition to Station Officer there are Assistant Station Officers, Senior Fire and Rescue Officer, Senior Fire and Rescue Officer (Mechanic), Fire and Rescue Officer (Driver), Fire and Rescue Officer. In addition to this, there is a full-fledged ministerial staff at Headquarters, Regional offices, Viyyur Academy and District Offices.

Regional Fire Offices, Districts, and Fire Stations
Regional Office	District	Fire & Rescue Stations
Thiruvananthapuram (HQ: Thiruvananthapuram)	Thiruvananthapuram	Thiruvananthapuram, Chacka, Vizhinjam, Parassala, Neyyattinkara, Kattakada, Nedumangad, Attingal, Varkala, Poovar, Vithura, Venjaramoodu, Kallambalam, Kazhakoottam
Thiruvananthapuram (HQ: Thiruvananthapuram)	Kollam	Kadappakada, Chamakada, Paravoor, Kundara, Punaloor, Kadakkal, Sasthamkotta, Karunagappally, Kottarakkara, Pathanapuram, Chavara.
Kottayam (HQ: Kottayam)	Kottayam	Kottayam, Kanjirapallly, Pala, Kaduthuruthy, Pampady, Changanaserry, Erattupetta, Vaikkom
Kottayam (HQ: Kottayam)	Pathanamthitta	Pathanamthitta, Thiruvalla, Adoor, Ranni, Seethathode, Konni.
Kottayam (HQ: Kottayam)	Alappuzha	Alappuzha, Kayamkulam, Mavelikkara, Haripad, Chengannur, Cherthala, Thakazhi, Aroor.
Ernakulam (HQ: Eranakulam)	Ernakulam	Club Road, Mattancherry, Thrikkakara, Thrippunithura, Piravam, Angamali, North Paravoor, Aluva, Koothattukulam, Muvattupuzha, Kalloorkad, Perumbavoor, Pattimattom, Eloor, Kothamangalam, Mulanthuruthy, and Vypin.
Ernakulam (HQ: Eranakulam)	Idukki	Idukki, Kattapana, Munnar, Thodupuzha, Peerumede, Moolamattom, Adimali, Nedumkandam.
Palakkad (HQ: Palakkad)	Thrissur	Thrissur, Chalakkudy, Irinjalakkuda, Mala, Kodungalloor, Kunnamkulam, Wadakkanchery, Puthukkad, Nattika, Guruvayoor
Palakkad (HQ: Palakkad)	Palakkad	Palakkad, Kanjikode, Mannarkkad, Chittur, Alathur, Shornur, Kollamkode, Kongad, Pattambi, Vadakkancheri
Palakkad (HQ: Palakkad)	Malappuram	Malappuram, Perinthalmanna, Manjeri, Nilambur, Tirur, Ponnani, Kondotty, Thiruvali
Kozhikode (HQ: Kozhikode)	Kozhikode	Meenchanda, Kozhikode Beach, Vellimadukunnu, Perambra, Nadapuram, Vadakara, Mukkom, Narikuni (Koduvalli), and Koilandy.
Kozhikode (HQ: Kozhikode)	Wayanad	Kalpetta, Sultan Bathery, Mananthavady
Kannur (HQ: Kannur)	Kannur	Iritty, Mattannur, Koothuparambu, Thalasserry, Thaliparambu, Peravoor, Payyannur, Peringom, and Panoor.
Kannur (HQ: Kannur)	Kasaragod	Kasaragod, Kanhangad, Uppala, Nileshwaram, Kuttikol

=== Hierarchy ===
==== Officers ====
- Director General, Fire and Rescue Services and Civil Defence (IPS Cadre)
- Director (Technical)/ Director (Administration)
- Regional Fire Officer (RFO)
- District Fire Officer (DFO)

==== Subordinates ====
- Station Officer (STO)
- Assistant Station Officer (ASTO)
- Senior Fire and Rescue Officer (SFRO)
- Senior Fire and Rescue Officer (Mechanic) [SFRO(M)]
- Fire and Rescue Officer (Driver) [FRO(D)]
- Fire and Rescue Officer (FRO)
- Fire Woman(FW)

== Rank structure ==
Kerala Fire and Rescue Services – Rank Structure
Title / Designation	Insignia	Explanation
Director General, Fire and Rescue Services, Civil Defence and Homeguards		An IPS officer of the rank DGP; Head of the department, overall command and policy decisions
Director (Technical) / Director (Administration)		Highest ranking uniformed officers assisting the DG in technical and administrative matters
Regional Fire Officer (RFO)		Supervises fire services across multiple districts; reports to headquarters. Heads fire and rescue services academy.
District Fire Officer (DFO)		In charge of fire and rescue operations in a district; manages fire stations within the district
Station Officer (STO)		Officer-in-charge of a fire station; leads fire and rescue operations locally. Also heads .
Assistant Station Officer (ASTO)		Assists the Station Officer in day-to-day operations and leadership
Senior Fire and Rescue Officer (SFRO)	(Sleeve insignia)	Experienced firefighter; may act as team leader in operations
Senior Fire and Rescue Officer (Mechanic)	(Sleeve insignia)	Specialised role for maintenance of fire vehicles and mechanical equipment
Fire and Rescue Officer (Driver)	No insignia	Drives and operates fire engines and emergency vehicles
Fire and Rescue Officer (FRO)	No Insignia	Entry-level personnel; frontline responder in fire and rescue missions

== Services ==
- Rescue services
- Pumping services
- Ambulance services
- Awareness programs
- Security Checkup
- Training programs
- Mock drills
- Stand-by duties
- Recovery vehicles

== Selection and training ==
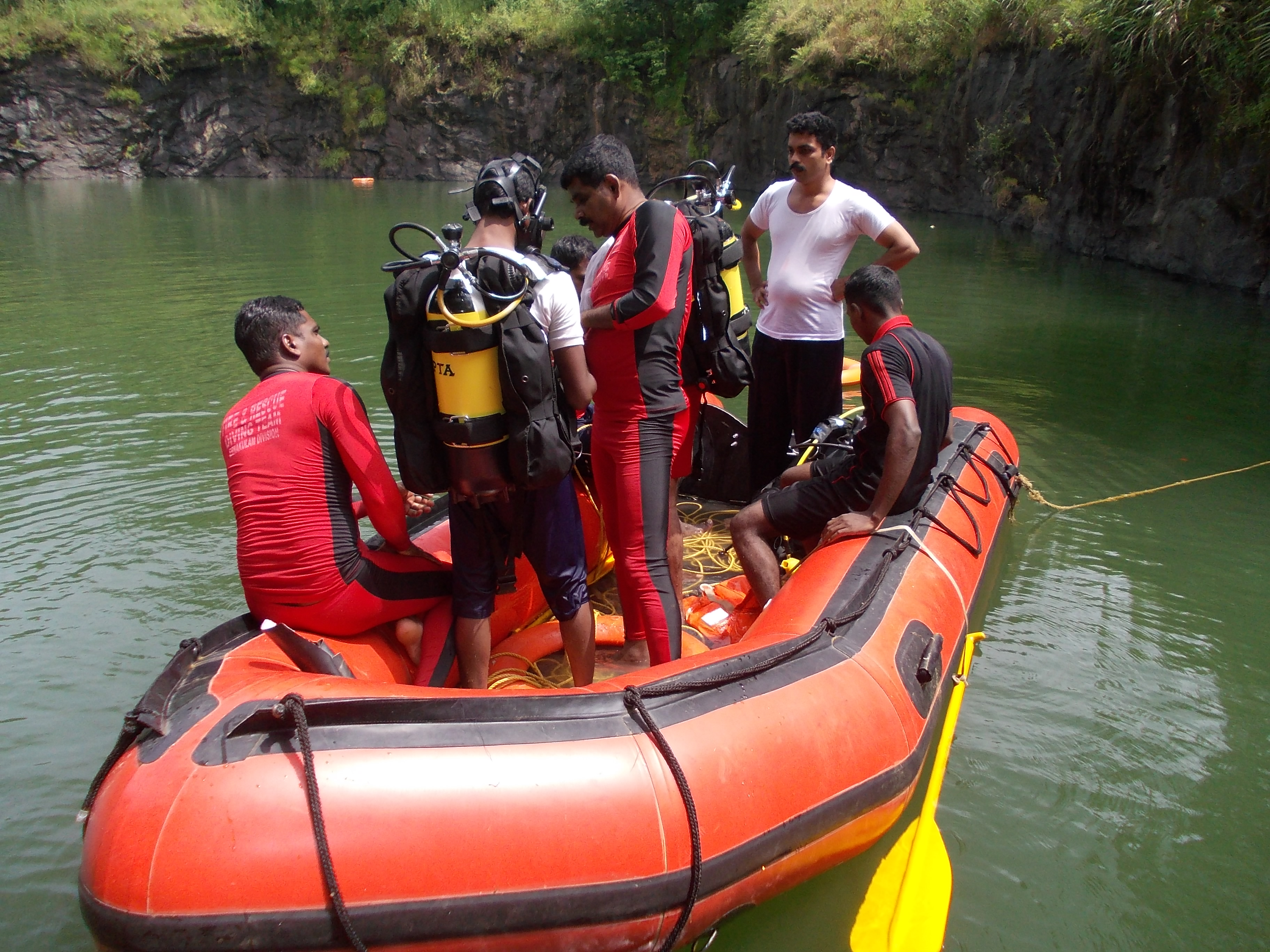
SCUBA training

Recruitment of personnel is based on statewide. The Kerala Public Service Commission is undertaking the recruitment procedure. Recruitment procedure includes written examination, physical test and medical test. Those who has selected has to undergo a training as specified. For imparting training to the employees and newly recruited Fire and Rescue Officer, Fireman and Rescue Officer( Driver) and Senior Fire and Rescue Officer (Mechanic), Fire And Rescue Services Academy was started at Viyyur, Thrissur in 2007. The supervision of this Academy is held by the Director in the rank of Regional Fire Officer. Three District Fire Officers and Station Officer who have the charge of the training are also working in this Academy.

== See also ==
- Kerala Fire and Rescue Services Academy
- National Disaster Response Force (NDRF)

== Gallery ==
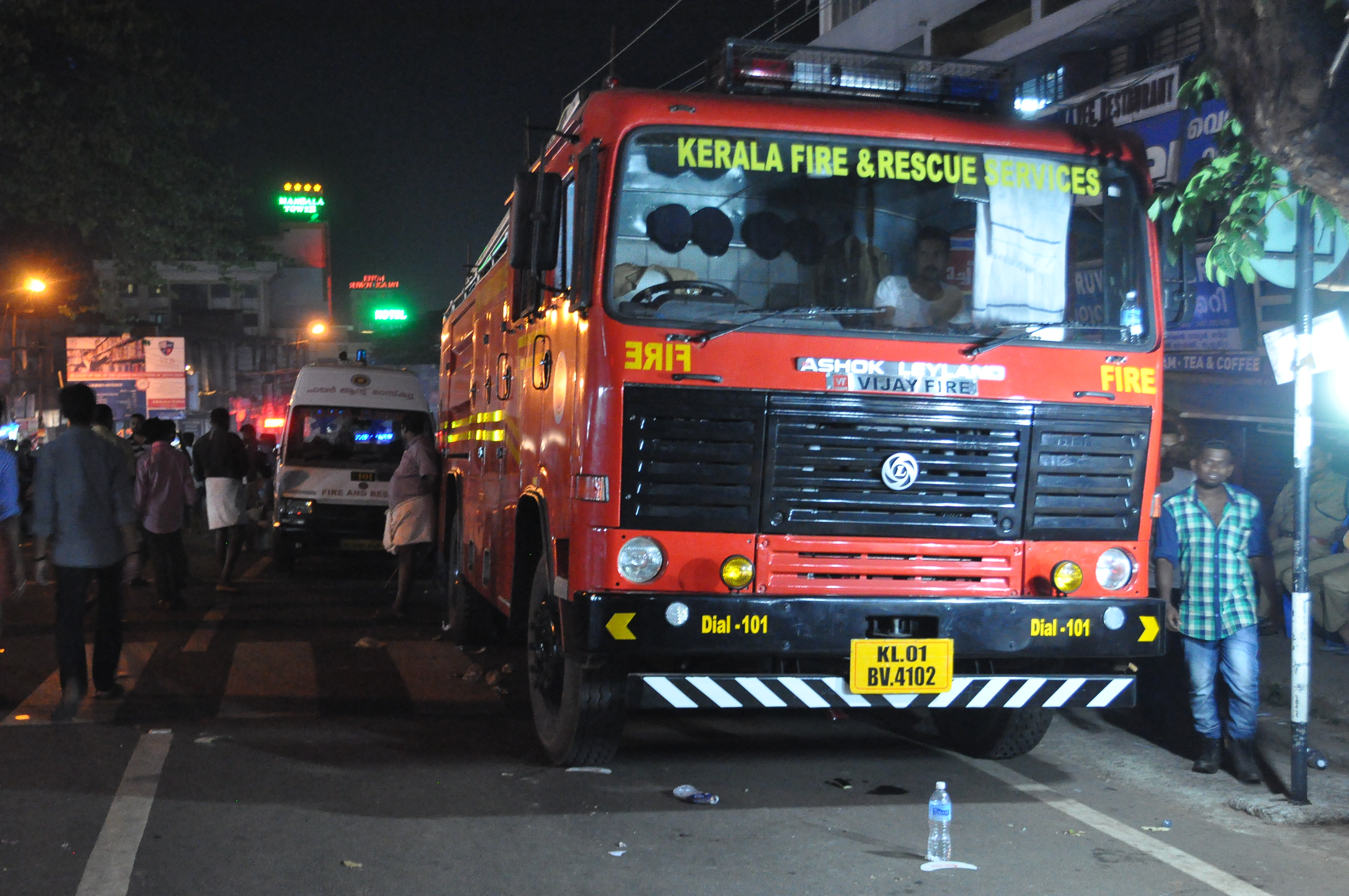
Kerala Fire and Rescue Services Ashok Leyland fire engine standby during a festival.

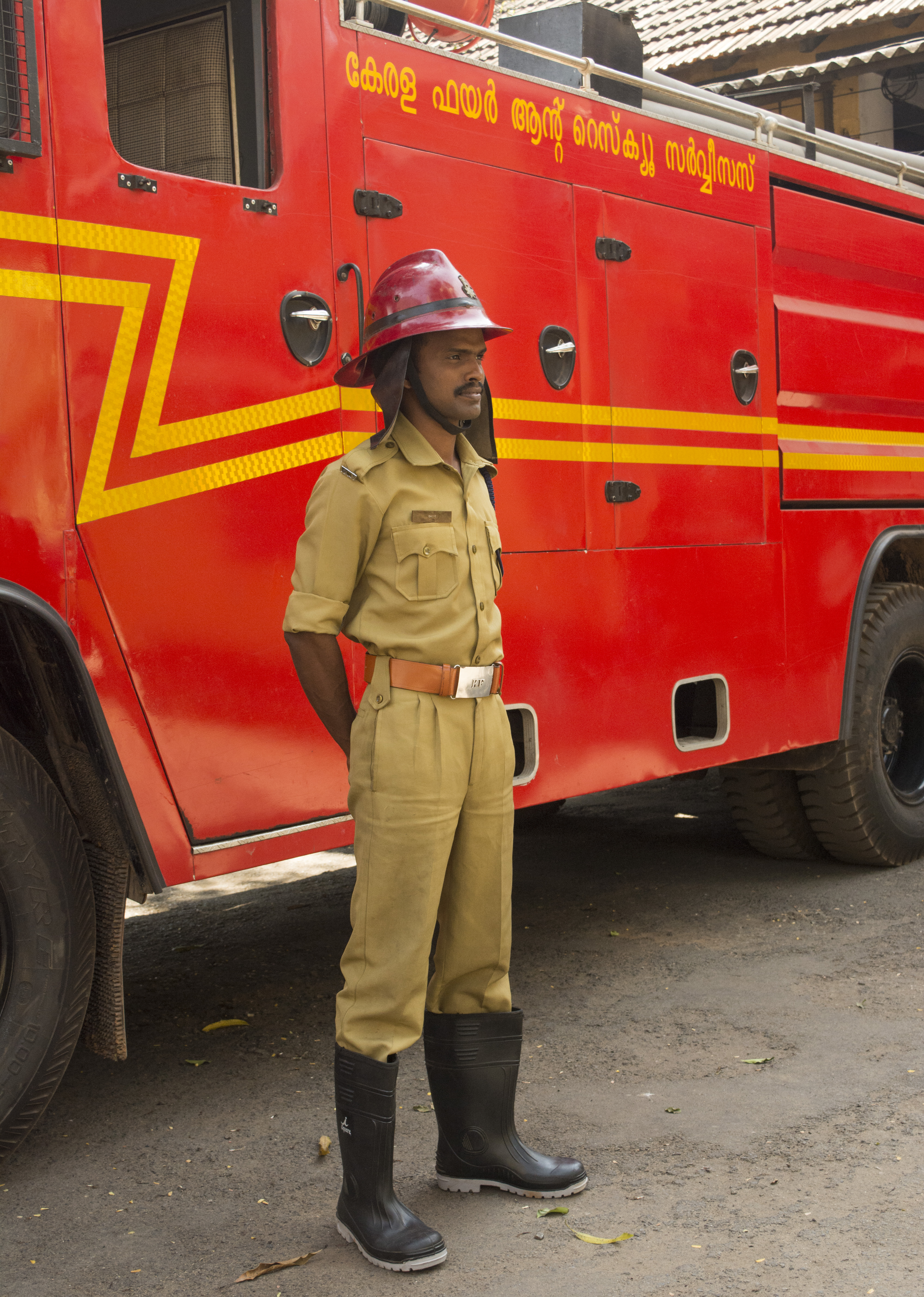
Fireman in uniform.

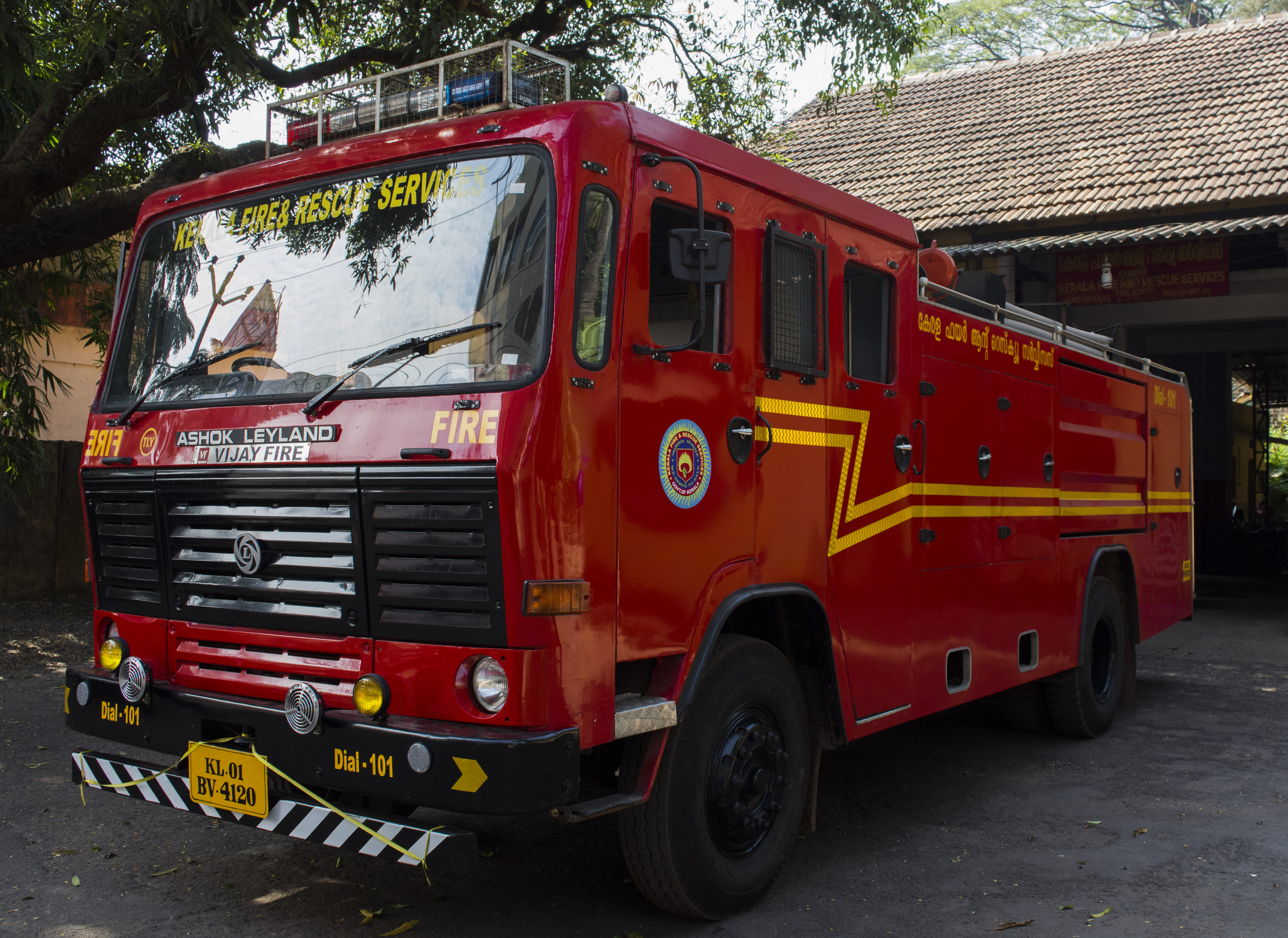
Water tender used by the KFRS.

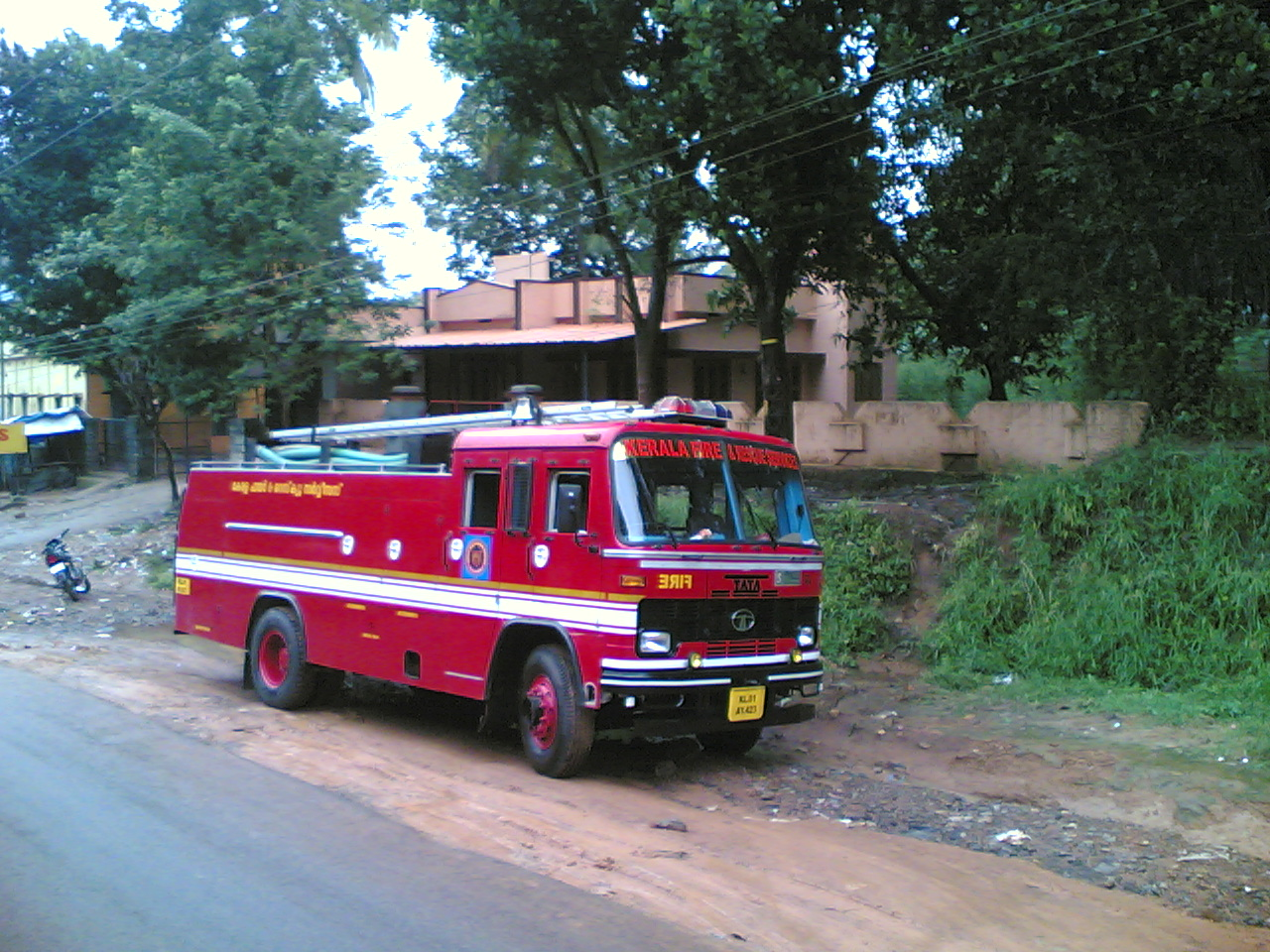
An old Tata engine of the Kerala Fire Force.

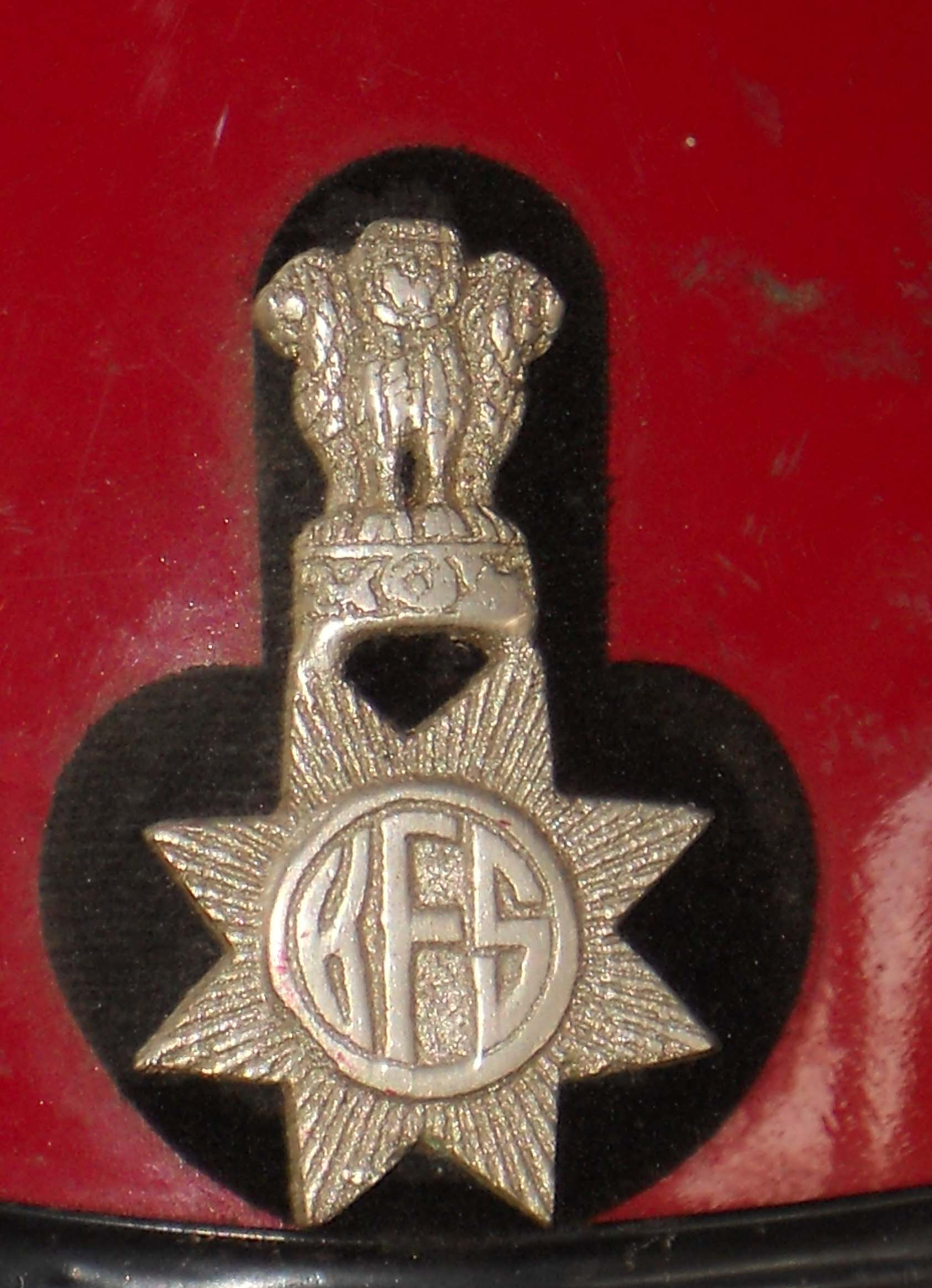
emblem

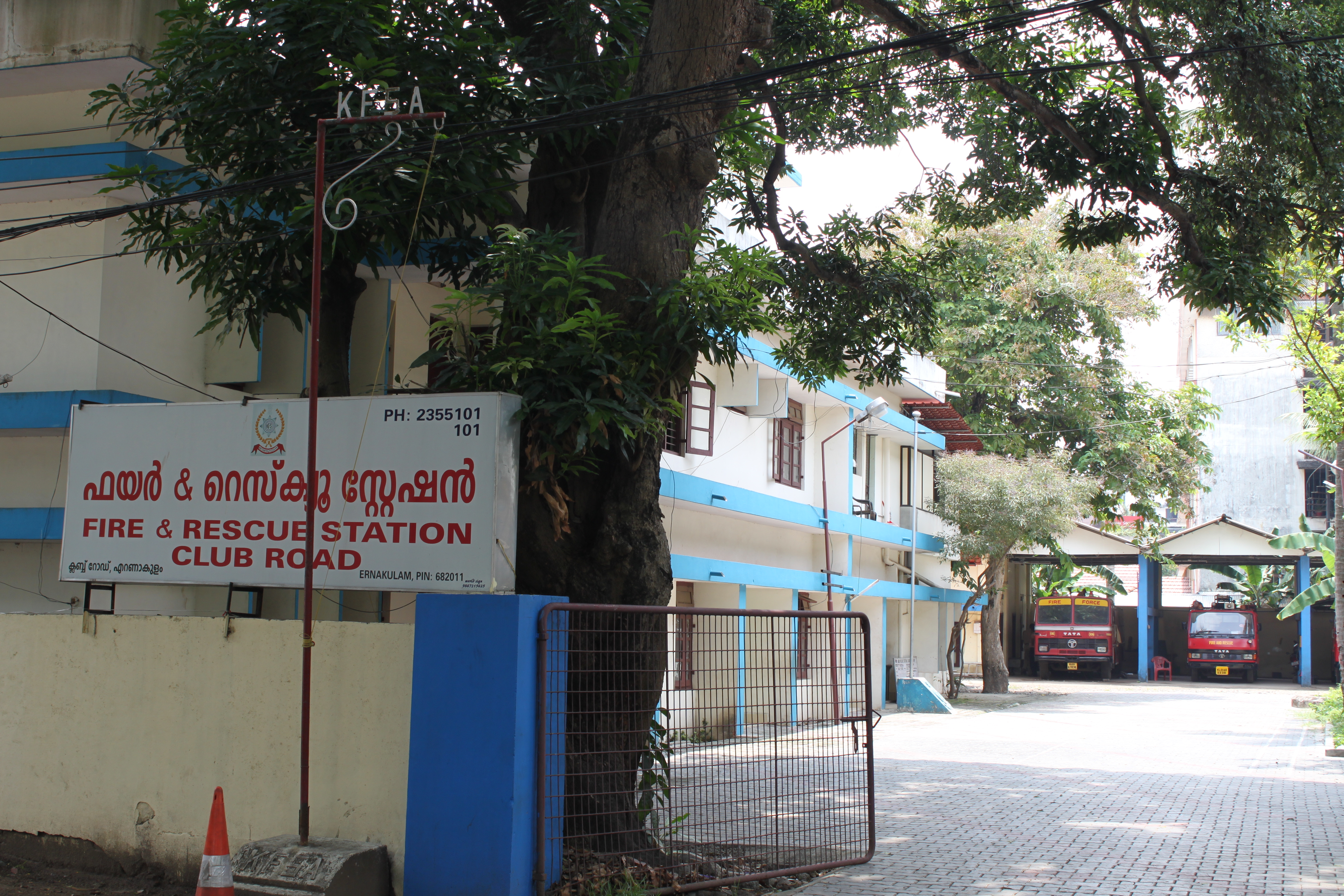
Fire and Rescue Station, Ernakulam.

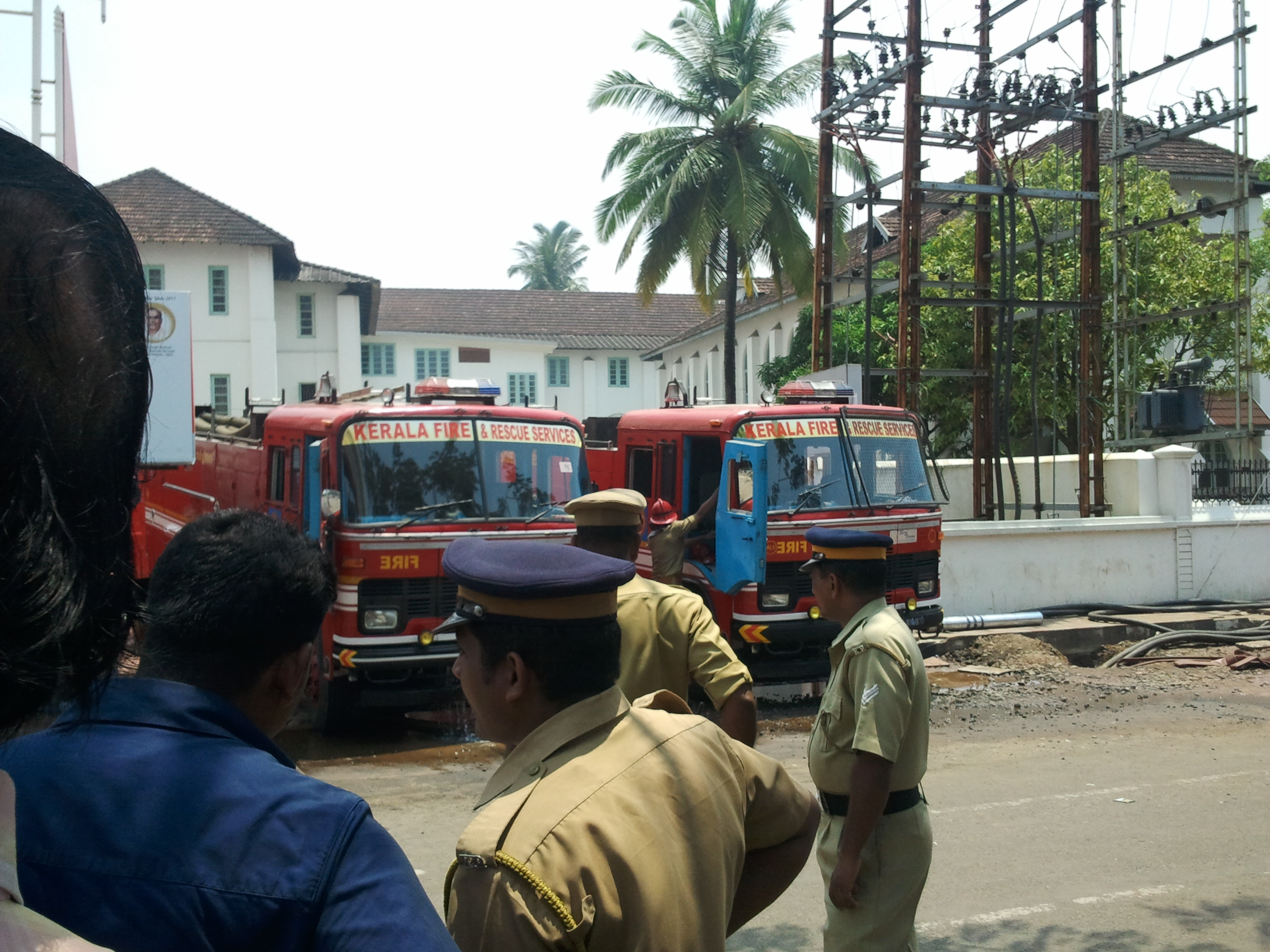
Firemen in duty.

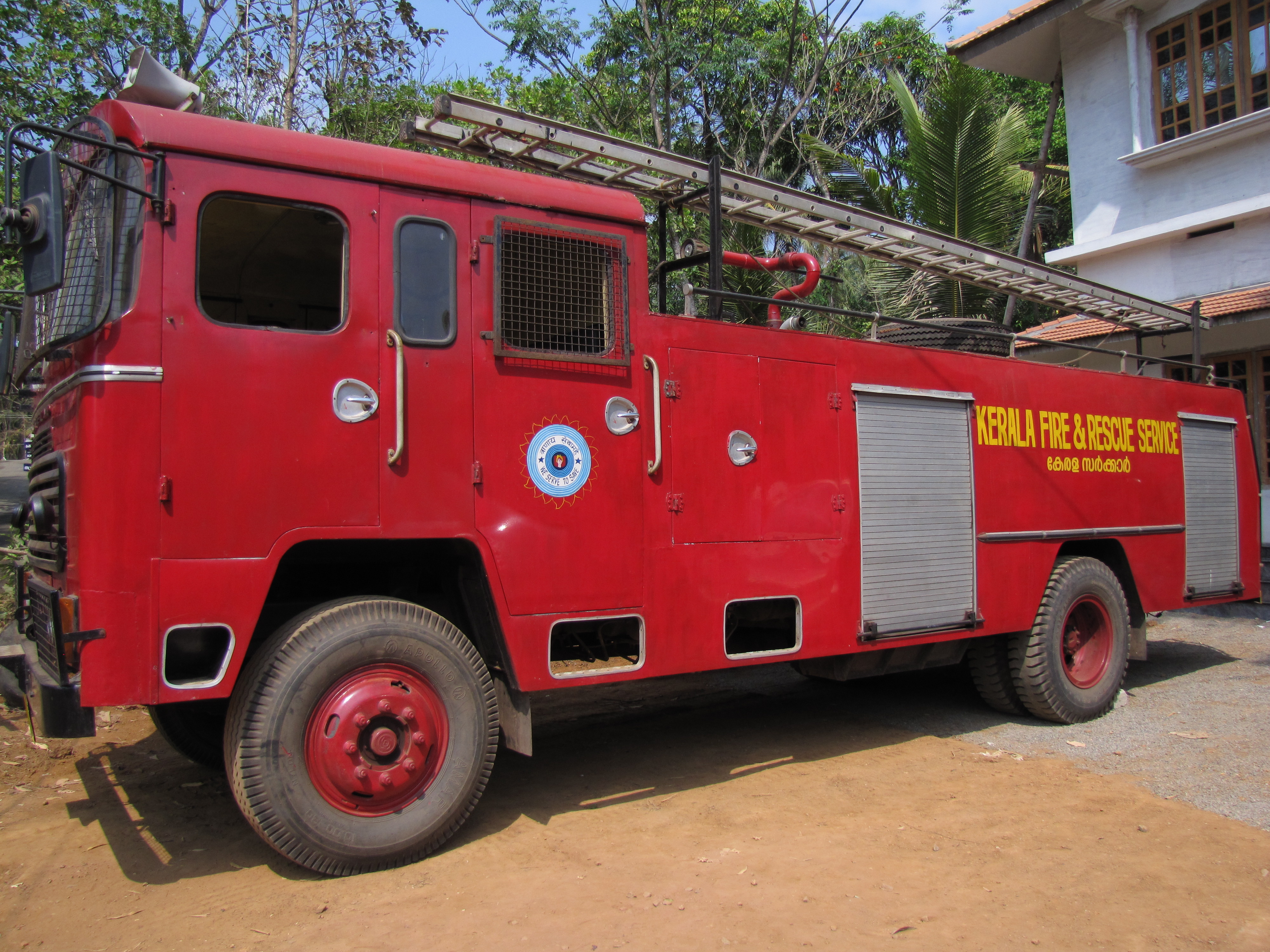
water tender

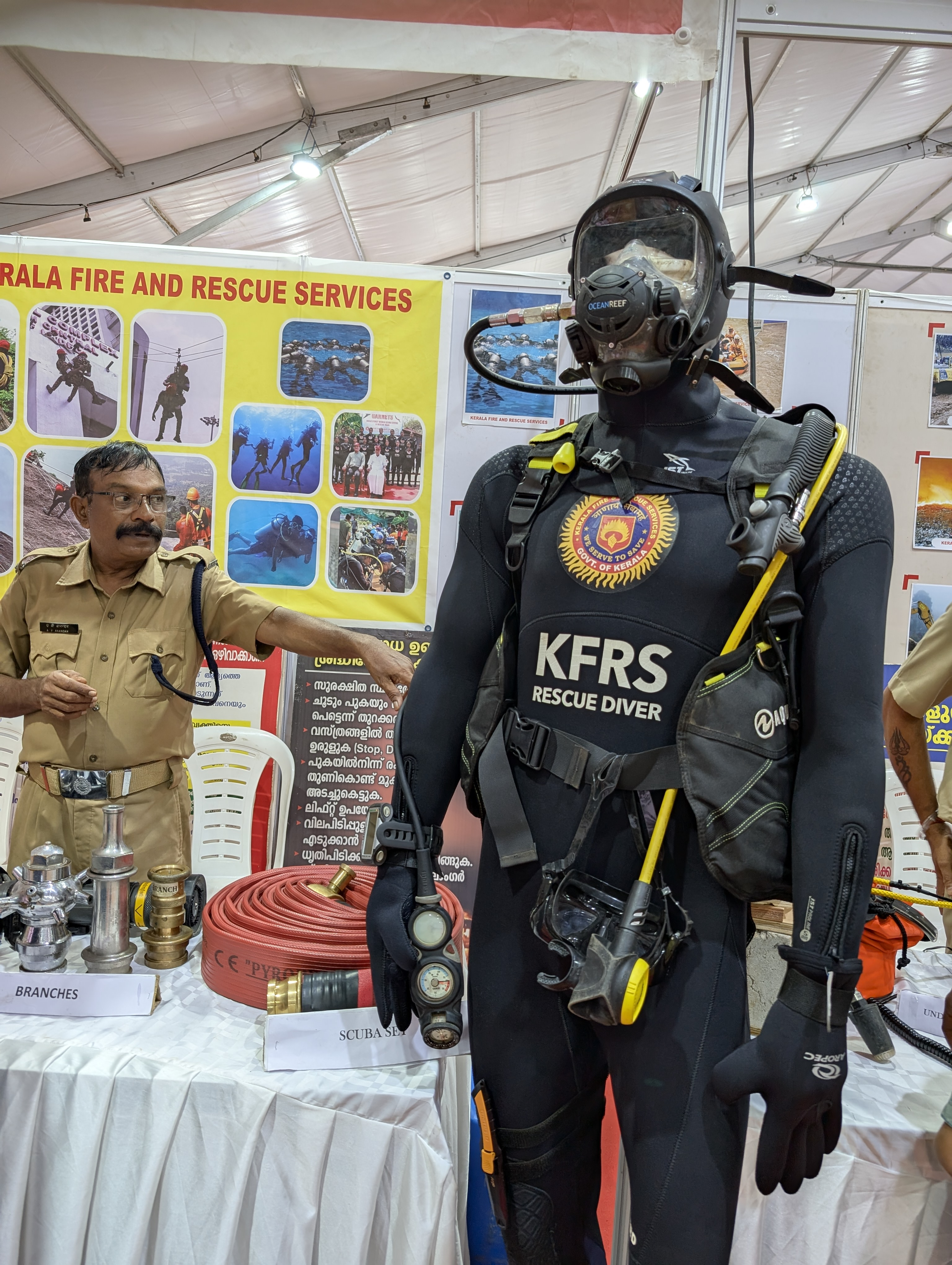
