= Nimisha Priya =

Indian nurse and convicted murderer

- Priya
- Born: 1987 (age 38–39); Kollengode, Palakkad, Kerala, India
- Motive: To retrieve passport
- Conviction: Murder
- Penalty: Death

Details
- Victims: Talal Abdo Mahdi
- Country: Yemen
- Weapon: ketamine
- Date apprehended: August 2017

Nimisha Priya (born 1987) is an Indian nurse and convicted murderer. She has been on death row in Yemen's Central prison since 2018, after being convicted of the 2017 murder of a Yemeni citizen.

== Life ==
Priya grew up in Kollengode, Palakkad, Kerala, where she did well in school. A local church supported her financially, allowing her to complete a course in nursing. However, Priya was unable to work as a nurse in Kerala, as she "hadn't cleared her school leaving exams" prior to beginning her nursing studies.

In 2008, Priya moved from Kerala to Yemen for work. In Yemen, she worked as a nurse for a government-run hospital in the country's capital, Sanaa. In 2014, Priya left her job with the hope of starting her own clinic. Per Yemeni law, Priya needed a Yemeni business partner, so she recruited Talal Abdo Mahdi, a local businessman who owned a textile shop. In early 2015, Priya opened the Al Aman Medical Clinic, a 14-bed facility, financing the move with money she and her husband had borrowed.

After the Yemeni civil war broke out in March 2015, Priya was resolved to stay in the country, considering the amount of money she had invested into her clinic. Priya also began having issues with her business partner, Mahdi; according to Priya, he stole funds from her, threatened her physically, and claimed at times to be her husband. He also confiscated her passport and documents and prevented her from speaking to her family in India. Although Priya reported his behavior to the police in 2016, they did not intervene to help her.

== Murder, arrest, and prison sentence ==
In July 2017, Priya injected Talal Abdo Mahdi with ketamine, causing him to die of an overdose. According to Priya and her advocates, she had planned simply to sedate Mahdi, allowing her to retrieve her passport and other documents from his control. Priya was arrested near Yemen's border with Saudi Arabia in August 2017. At the time, news media reported falsely that the two had been married. Her accomplice was also arrested and sentenced to life in prison.

In 2018, Priya was tried and convicted for the murder of Mahdi and sentenced to death. According to Indian Supreme Court lawyer K. R. Subhash Chandran, Priya's trial was held entirely in Arabic, which Priya does not speak, and she was not given an interpreter or a lawyer. Chandran and other supporters of Priya have called for a retrial due to these factors. In June 2018, Priya was moved from Al Bayda jail to a prison in Sanaa. In 2020, Priya was again tried, with an identical outcome. That same year, the Save Nimisha Priya International Action Council was formed by Priya's relatives and other supporters. Since its formation, the group has worked to negotiate for Priya's release.

While in prison, Priya has established bonds with her fellow female inmates, who have also supported her potential release.

In November 2023, Yemen's Supreme Judicial Council rejected Priya's appeal. In April 2024, Priya's mother, husband, and daughter were able to visit Yemen, with plans to meet with Priya and to speak with Mahdi's family to arrange her release. The three had previously been unable to visit Yemen, as in 2017 India banned citizens from traveling to Yemen without special permission. Priya and her mother were able to meet on 24 April.

Advocates for Priya's release have worked to raise money to offer to Mahdi's family as blood money in return for her release. By June 2024, US$40,000 had been raised for Priya's release, half of which was then transferred to the Indian Embassy in Sanaa. Negotiations stalled by September 2024.

In late December 2024, Yemeni president Rashad al-Alimi approved Priya's death sentence, with her execution, at that time, expected to be held sometime in January 2025. Indian officials have stated they are continuing to explore options to free Priya or prevent her death. An Iranian official also indicated that Iran was also willing to help Priya. Priya's mother remained in Sanaa as of June 2025, continuing to work on negotiations with Mahdi's family. Her scheduled execution on 16 July 2025 was postponed by authorities. As of the postponement, supporters had raised US$58,000 to negotiate her release.

Priya's sentence was criticized by Amnesty International in July 2025, who called for all death sentences of prisoners in Yemen to be commuted.

== Personal life ==
In 2011, Priya returned to Kerala after her family arranged her marriage. She and her husband then returned to Yemen. After Priya gave birth to her daughter in December 2012, the family struggled to make enough money. In 2014, Priya's husband returned to India with their daughter.
