= HiLITE Business Park =

Indian business park

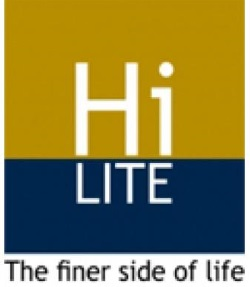
- HiLITE Business Park
- Interactive map of the HiLITE Business Park area

General information
- Location: Calicut, Kerala, India, HiLITE City
- Coordinates: 11.254632°N 75.824642°E
- Opening: 2013; 13 years ago
- Owner: HiLITE Group

Technical details
- Floor count: 7
- Floor area: 1,400,000 square feet (130,000 m^{2})

Design and construction
- Developer: HiLITE Builders

Other information
- Parking: 1500+

Website
- hilitebusinesspark.com

HiLITE Business Park is a commercial Indian business park made up of a office complex located within HiLITE City, Kozhikode, Kerala, India. It was developed and is managed by HiLITE Realty, a Calicut-based real estate and infrastructure company. The business park forms part of the larger HiLITE City mixed-use development, which includes residential, retail, hospitality, and educational facilities such as which includes residential, retail, hospitality, and educational facilities such as Hilite Mall Calicut.

Opened in April 2015, the park consists of twin office towers with a built-up area of approximately 1.4 million square feet. It provides office space for information technology firms, business service providers, and startups.

In 2025, HiLITE Realty announced the World Trade Center Kozhikode, a 12.5 million square foot expansion project within HiLITE City. Construction continued through 2026, with plans to include commercial towers, educational institutions, and convention facilities. HiLITE Business Park is located adjacent to this development and continues to serve as part of the city’s business infrastructure.

== History ==
The project was announced in the early 2010s by HiLITE Realty following demand for organized office infrastructure in northern Kerala. Construction began in 2013, and the business park was inaugurated on 10 April 2015.

In 2014, the developers announced plans to establish a dedicated innovation and startup zone within the complex to attract technology startups and business service firms. The complex consists of twin office towers with a total built-up area of approximately 1.4 million square feet.

In 2025, HiLITE Realty announced the World Trade Center Kozhikode, an expansion project within HiLITE City. The project was planned as a large World Trade Center development with approximately 12.5 million square feet of leasable space.

== Location and Connectivity ==
HiLITE Business Park is situated within HiLITE City, on the main Calicut–Wayanad road, providing direct access to the city’s transport network. The site is located approximately 20 km from Calicut International Airport and 8 km from the Calicut railway station. The surrounding zone includes shopping complexes, educational campuses, and residential neighborhoods within the walled city.
