= Pradhan Mantri Schools for Rising India =

Educational scheme

- Country: India
- Prime Minister(s): Narendra Modi
- Ministry: Education
- Key people: Dharmendra Pradhan
- Launched: 7 September 2022; 4 years ago
- Status: Active
- Website: pmshrischools.education.gov.in

Pradhan Mantri Schools for Rising India (transl. Prime Minister's Schools for Rising India) or simply PM ShRI Scheme was launched by Government of India on 7 September 2022 to improve the quality of education and infrastructure in schools. The PM SHRI schools are schools that implement the National Education Policy 2020, and to be eligible for the funding, they must use the prefix "PM SHRI" in their names.

== Overview ==
It was proposed to implement the scheme in more than 14,500 schools with a budgetary allocation of ₹273.6 billion (US$2.8 billion) between 2022–23 and 2026-27. As of 7 October 2024, what ??it has been implemented in 10,855 schools across states and union territories. However, some states have refused to implement the scheme, arguing that it is unsatisfactory and represents a right-wing shift, or the "saffronization" of education.

A maximum of two schools (one elementary & one secondary/senior secondary) are selected per block, and the selection of PM SHRI schools is done through 'Challenge Mode', in which schools compete for facility-upgradation funding based on their compliance with the national scheme. The beneficiary schools must brand themselves with the prefix "PM SHRI" to receive full funding. According to a survey by the Union Ministry of Education, the number of enrollment has been increased significantly in several PM SHRI schools in 2023-24.

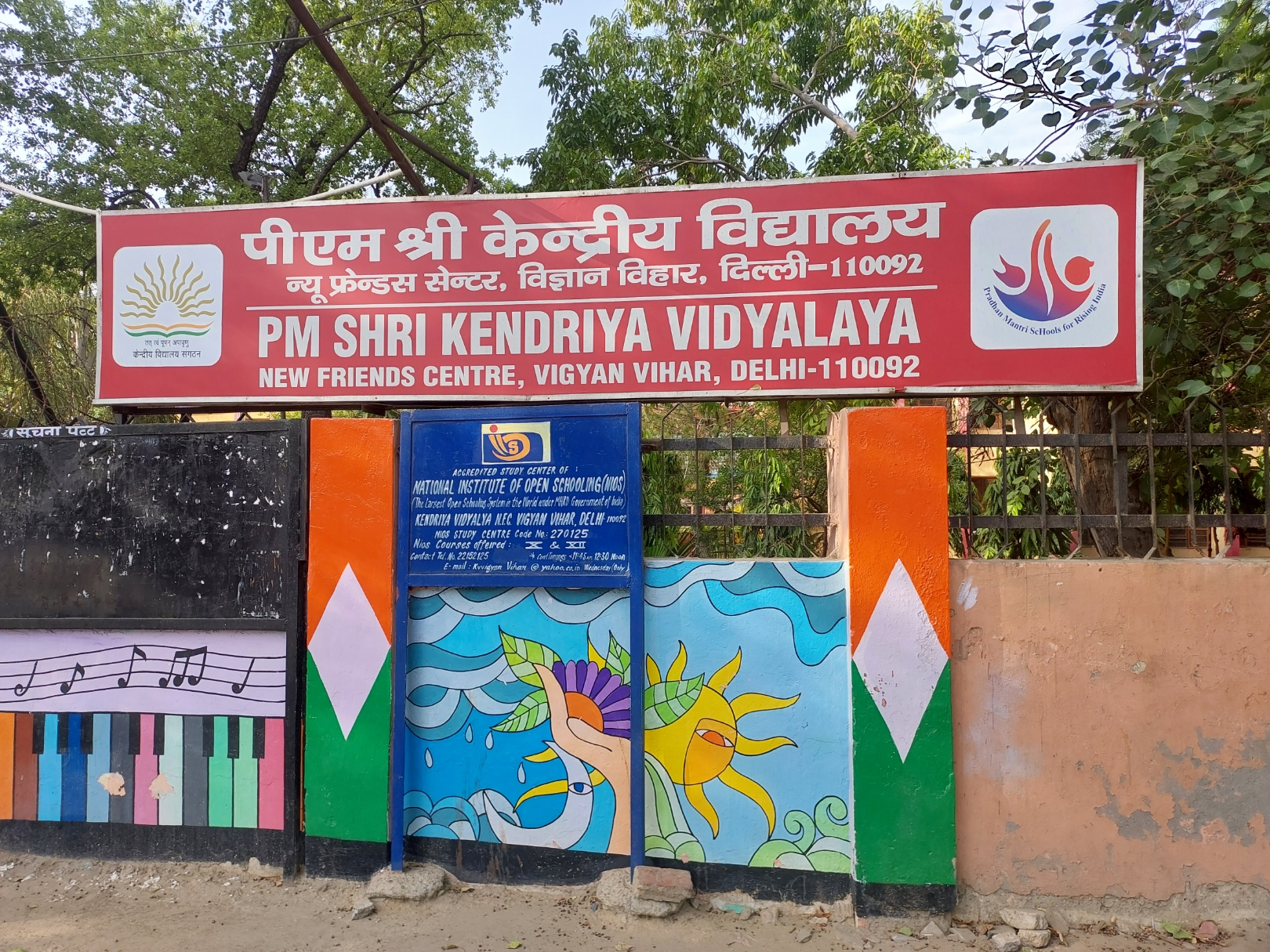
A Kendriya Vidyalaya with the prefix "PM SHRI".

== Features ==
The PM SHRI Schools are developed with an emphasis on environmental sustainability, incorporating features such as solar panels, LED lighting, nutrition gardens with natural farming practices, waste management systems, plastic-free zones, water conservation, and rainwater harvesting. These schools make students competent in Indian languages, and also work on "linking students to local industry for skill development". Moreover, these schools have smart classes, digital library, digital laboratories and other digital learning tools which help students to understand every lesson in details and clearly.
