= Look out circular =

Document used to locate criminals in India

Look out circular (LOC) is a circular letter used by authorities in India to check whether a traveling person is wanted by the police. It may be used at immigration checks at international borders such as international airports or sea ports.

== Definition ==
Look out circulars are opened to search for absconding criminals and also to prevent and monitor effectively the entry or exit of anyone who may be sought by law enforcement authorities. When issued, they are sent to all immigration checkpoints in the country. An LOC is valid for an initial period of one year, but can be extended.

== Effectiveness ==
Many individuals with pending criminal proceeding are living or working or travelling abroad, and an LOC is not issued in every case. The number of LOCs issued and the grounds for their issue are not available. This has led to a perception of corruption. Many high profile individuals have avoided criminal investigation or proceeding by travelling abroad.
