= Sand mining in Tamil Nadu =

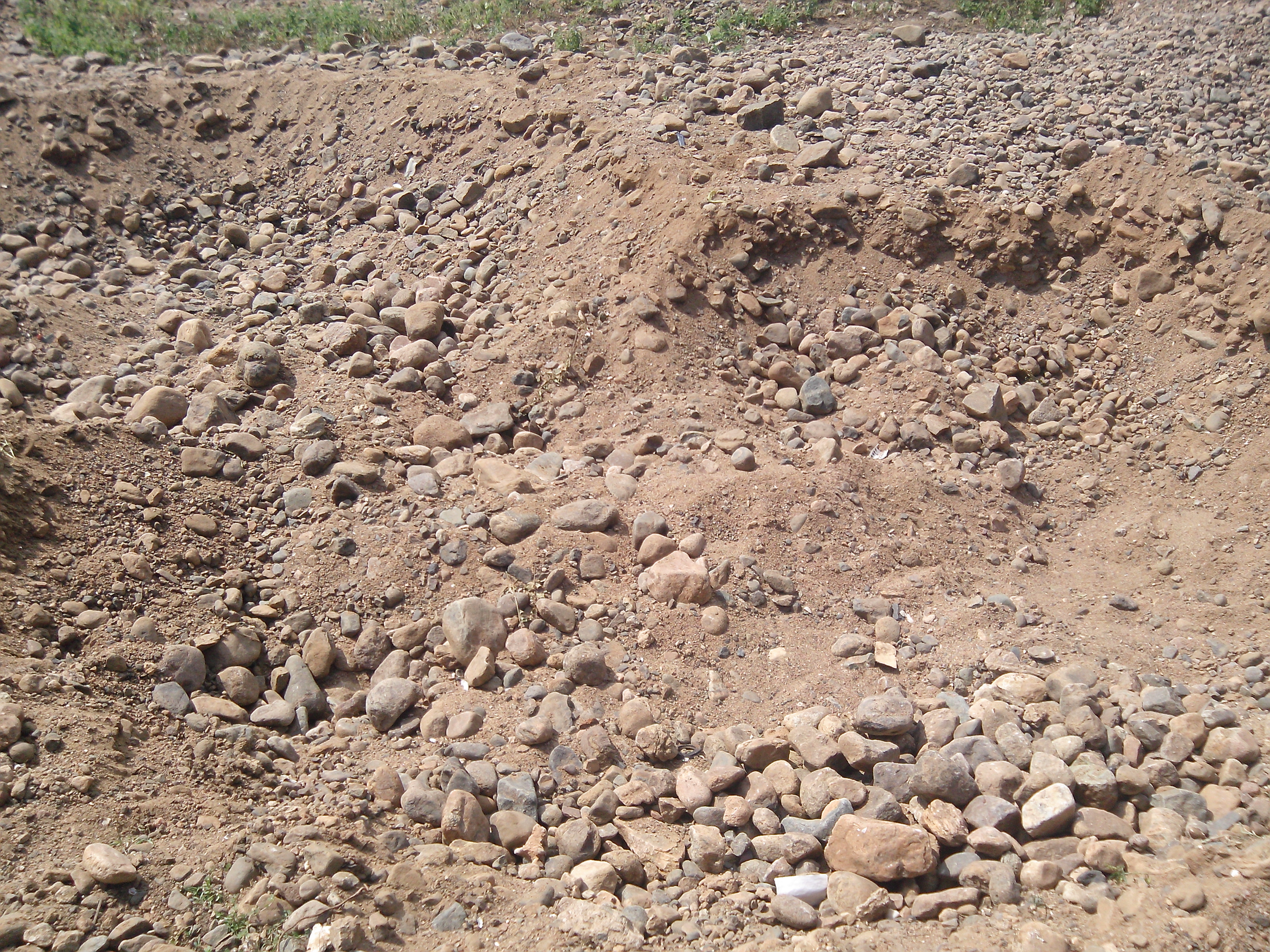
A mined river bed in Kachirapalayam

Sand mining, especially illegal sand mining in Tamil Nadu state is done on river beds, basins and beaches, It has been on an increase, since the beginning of the 1990s following a boom in the construction industry. Palar River basin, Vaigai River basin, Cauvery River basin (including its tributaries) and Thamirabarani River basin are some of the most affected regions. Illegal quarrying is happening in these areas in broad daylight. Though as per Tamil Nadu Public Works Department, 5,500-6,000 truck loads of 200 cubic ft. of sand is mined each day, in reality this figure is estimated to be around 55,000 truckloads of 400 cubic ft. of sand per day. In 2013, illegal sand mining in the state was estimated to be worth ₹15,000 crore (US$1.6 billion). This resulted in the state exchequer losing over ₹19,800 crore (US$2.1 billion) in revenue.

== History ==
River sand mining began in the state as a small scale unorganised activity in the 1980s. It quickly began to boom in late 1980s and the beginning of the 1990s owing to a boom in real estate and construction. During the late 1980s the industry was mostly under the control of small local politicians, but political parties soon found sand mining to be a very lucrative source of revenue, hence by the beginning of the 1990s district level politicians soon emerged as major decision makers in the industry and permits were given on partisan lines and became very contentious. The AIADMK government during the 1990s amended the rules to allow granting of mining leases without any auction, this continued even after it was voted out and replaced by a DMK government. This practice led to political parties giving leases to a small group of miners affiliated to them, and allowed the party high command to bypass local leadership. This practice was ended by the Madras High Court in 2001 when it cancelled all such leases granted without an auction.

In 2003, the then state government under the AIADMK brought all river sand mining under the Public Works Department (PWD), in practice however the PWD did not have the necessary capacity to meet the demand for river sand, this led to it subcontracting the mining, loading and unloading to private contractors after an auction. The PWD also failed to carry out the necessary inspections, and many of the contracts continued to be given to the previous group of private sand miners who had formed cartels, this in effect led to very little change on the ground.

== Beach sand and mineral mining ==
The coasts of Tamil Nadu and Kerala have beach sand deposits of various minerals such as illmenite, zircon, rutile, garnet, sillimanite, leucoxene, and monazite. From 1993 onwards, private firms were granted permission to mine beach sand and were allowed to mine the minerals- sillimanite and garnet. By 2007 this had expanded to include all the minerals including monazite from which radioactive elements such as thorium and small quantities of uranium can be extracted. Due to the presence of these radioactive elements in these minerals, their extraction poses occupational and environmental risk. Illegal sand mining without clearances was widespread in the districts of Tirunelveli, Kanyakumari, and Tuticorin.

=== Illegal mining ===
Between 2000-2008 a group of companies including V.V Minerals, Transworld Garnet India, Beach Minerals Company, etc mined over 34 lakh (3.4 million) metric tonnes of raw sand, 9 lakh (900 thousand) metric tonnes of garnet, 8 lakh (800 thousand) metric tonnes of ilmenite, 3,500 metric tonnes of zircon, and 1,350 metric tonnes of rutile, which were mined and stored at quantities far above the legal amount allowed to be mined. The miners also tried to hide illegalities by showing waste sand as raw sand.

In April–May 2017 the Sahoo Committee found that 37,000 metric tonnes of monazite, was sitting in godowns belonging to private beach sand miners. With 777 metric tonnes of it being ready for export. This was despite the Department of Atomic Energy prohibiting the processing and export of monazite. This monazite was stored either mixed in with raw beach sand, or as semi-processed and processed minerals in their godowns, in spite of Atomic Energy Regulatory Board (AERB) requiring it to be stored in AERB approved sites, for regular inspection. It was calculated that over 4.6 crore (46 million) metric tonnes of raw sand was required to extract the 23,608 metric tonnes of monazite found in a yard belonging to V.V Minerals alone.

In 2021, the Tamil Nadu government began conducting a reassessment of stocks of beach sand minerals in sealed godowns based on police reports of illegal transportation of the minerals from the sealed premises. The 2018 Sahoo Committee report had assessed the stocks of beach sand minerals in the godowns to be 1.5 crore (15 million) tonnes, however during the reassessment only 1.33 crore (13.3 million) tonnes of stock was found to remain in the sealed facilities, with a calculated shortfall of 16.04 lakh (1.604 million) tonnes of minerals, while 6.62 lakh (662,000) tonnes of additional stock was found to remain in possession of private miners, including 6,448 tonnes of monazite.

=== Private Monopolization ===
The private beach sand mining industry was dominated by S. Vaikundarajan and his family. His companies- V.V Minerals and Transworld Garnet India, alone accounted for 80% of the market share in the beach sand mining industry. His family members own the companies- Beach Minerals Company and Industrial Mineral Company, both of which are also involved in similar activities.

=== Ban on private mining ===
In 2016 the Central Government banned private mining of beach sand with monazite concentrations above 0.75%. On 20 February 2019 the Central Government issued a notification prohibiting the grant of atomic mineral rights to anyone other than the government or government agencies, effectively banning private beach sand mining. The Department of Atomic Energy issued a notification on 27 July 2019 stating that exploration rights of atomic minerals too solely rested with the government and its agencies.

=== Public sector monopolization ===
Since the cancelling of private leases in 2019, only government run agencies or corporations are allowed to conduct beach sand mining. This has made the public sector IREL (India) Limited the only legal beach sand mineral miner in the state. On June 11, 2021 the Ministry of Mines reserved an area of 1,144 hectares in Kanyakumari district for beach sand mineral mining and extraction by the corporation. This was the first such order in nearly 20 years as the company had been out-competed by private players who had colluded with government officials and politicians to prevent the company from getting any new leases and operating its manufacturing unit at full capacity.

== Impact ==
=== Environmental Impact ===
Since river sand is a natural aquifer, its depletion also means recharging of groundwater, especially wells, fall. In January 2014, the then Union Minister of State for Commerce and Industry E M Sudarsana Natchiappan, stated that due to sand mining in river beds, groundwater level or water table has dropped at an alarming rate, as a result some 18 lakh (1.8 million) wells in the southern region have gone dry and water for agriculture purposes has become scarce. In Madurai, as per S Rethinavelu, senior president of CII, "Water table, which was at 50 ft or so, fell to 600 ft." Sand mining also destroys the habitat of aquatic organisms and many birds, with dredging destroying the habitat of bottom dwelling organisms, the churned up sand blocks sunlight and suffocates aquatic organisms. The Supreme Court noted that this alarming rate of sand mining is destroying riparian ecosystems and has had fatal consequences for aquatic organisms and birds.

=== Impact on Infrastructure ===
Sand mining has been named as one of the causes of the failure of the Mukkombu Upper Anaicut regulator dam in 2018, due to loss of sand in the riverbed, percolation of water becomes less, which makes the river more prone to overflowing, which can damage infrastructure such as dams and barrages.

=== Political Impact ===
River sand mining emerged as a major source of funds for political parties in Tamil Nadu, and has played a role in the increasing amount of money used during electoral campaigning in the state. The larger Dravidian parties are able to get large sums of money through this enterprise, due to which they are able to spend a far more per voter than smaller parties. Due to the industry being so lucrative, even smaller parties started to depend on miners for their funding. Even in parties opposed to the activity, such as the CPI(M), the local party members continued to receive money from the sand miners. This has contributed to a culture of politics turning into a means of personal profit and money-making.

=== Local people and economy ===
Sand mining has been estimated to have provided over 2 lakh (200 thousand) jobs directly across Tamil Nadu. In villages on the banks of Cauvery, in the districts of Tiruchi and Karur, almost 40% of jobs are reliant on sand mining. This has led to many villagers collaborating with the sand miners, who have effectively taken over the local economy. Meanwhile agriculture and traditional sources of livelihood are being disrupted due to the environmental impact of sand mining, which has further increased the reliance of locals on sand mining.

== Suppression of dissent ==
=== Violence and Murder ===
Like elsewhere in India, individuals working against the interests of sand miners in Tamil Nadu routinely face the threat of violence and multiple cases of murders related to sand mining are reported every year. Officials actively working against illegal sand mining face threats of violence, and are transferred out of the district such as with the case of U Sagayam, a revenue officer who had his vehicle attacked in retaliation against his efforts to prevent sand mining in the Palar riverbed, and was transferred a few months after the incident. Some individuals working against sand mining have been murdered in "accidents" involving sand lorries, while some activists and protestors are hacked to death. These incidents have led to illegal sand miners and their nexus of supportive officials and local leaders, to be labelled as "sand mafia" in popular culture.

According to SANDRP between December 2020 to March 2022, in Tamil Nadu 19 people lost their lives and 10 suffered injuries owing to sand mining related violence and accidents.

=== Suppression of Journalists ===
Journalists reporting on sand mining are silenced using defamation lawsuits, intimidation, and threats of violence. For instance, Sandhya Ravishankar, a Chennai-based journalist, had to face a targeted harassment and hate campaign for writing a 4 part series of articles published in The Wire on illegal beach sand mining.

=== Pacification of locals ===
In response to local protests and opposition in many villages affected by their activities, sand miners began to employ a combination of rewards and threats. They provided funding to local temples, and for local festivals. They provided money to village panchayats and those running for it, paying Sarpanches Rs 40 lakhs (4 million), ex-Sarpanches Rs 20 lakhs (2 million), and the local leaders of parties Rs 1-2 lakhs (100 thousand to 200 thousand) each. Later on they began distributing cash to villagers on a per ration card basis, with the exact amount varying by the region, The Hindu had reported a figure of Rs 5000 per Ration card for two villages in Vellore district, while Scroll.in had reported a figure of Rs 4700 for villages in Villupuram district. This along with the domination of sand mining in the local economy, has led to some villagers turning hostile towards any attempts to stop sand mining in their village.

== Legal battle ==
There have been numerous petitions against illegal sand mining in the courts and the National Green Tribunal. In 2001, the Madras High Court in response to a public interest litigation (PIL) cancelled all mining leases granted without an auction. In 2010, the Madras High Court issued an order halting sand mining on Thenpennaiyar river, however this order was only implemented for a month by the administration In 2013 the National Green Tribunal banned illegal sand and mineral mining in beaches of Tamil Nadu and Kerala without environmental clearances. However, this order too was not implemented on the ground. In November 2017, the Madras High Court ordered all sand mining and quarrying to be banned in the state within 6 months and halted the issuance of any new leases, and ordered the state government to enact regulations on import of sand. The Madras High court refused to stay the order in response to an appeal by the Tamil Nadu government. The Supreme Court stayed this order in the following year.

In April 2022, the National Green Tribunal directed the Chief Secretary of Tamil Nadu to form a permanent panel to monitor illegal sand mining in Chennai, in response to illegal sand mining on the Cooum river. It also directed the police to patrol areas prone to illegal sand mining, confiscate any heavy vehicles involved, and install CCTV cameras to monitor such places.

== Government Response ==
To curtail the rampant mining, in November 2013, Government of Tamil Nadu banned mining in 71 of the 90 sand quarries. Then in January 2014, the Union Ministry of Environment and Forests issued guidelines, according to which quarries with lease area of five to 25 hectares can only allow manual mining, but there was ambiguity on whether the rules were applicable to existing quarries too, the state PWD believed existing quarries were exempt and could continue using heavy machinery. However illegal sand mining is rampant according to newspaper reports and observation.

The Union Ministry of Mines in an affidavit to the Madras High Court stated that responsibility for prevention of illegal mining lay with the state government and only the state government can take direct action against illegal mining.

== See also ==
- Illegal mining in India
