= Nenmara double murder case =

2025 murders in Kerala, India

- Location: Nemmara, Palakkad district, Kerala
- Date: January 27, 2025; 21 months ago
- Attack type: Murder by stabbing
- Deaths: 2
- Accused: 1
- Charges: Murder

On 27 January 2025, 76-year-old Meenakshi Lakshmi and her son, 58-year-old Sudhakaran, were stabbed to death in Nemmara, Palakkad district of Kerala, India. The suspected assailant is Chenthamara, who was convicted for the 2019 murder of Sudhakaran's wife and was released on parole in 2025.

== Investigation ==
According to police, Chenthamara fled to a nearby forest following the killings, hiding in the Mattai forest area of Pothundy. The Kerala Police started a search on January 27, 2025 to arrest Chenthamara. He was remanded in custody by 29 January.

Some reports said that eyewitnesses to the events feared testifying due to potential reprisal against them.

A charge sheet was filed in the Alathur Magistrate Court in March 2025, with Chenthamara being the sole accused.
