= Puthur, Thrissur =

Puthur
- village
- Location in Kerala, India Puthur (India)
- Coordinates: 10.49°N 76.28°E
- Country: India
- State: Kerala
- District: Thrissur

Languages
  - Official: Malayalam, English
- Time zone: UTC+5:30 (IST)
- PIN: 680014
- Telephone code: 0487
- Vehicle registration: KL08
- Nearest city: Thrissur

Puthur is a village in the taluk of Thrissur in the Thrissur district of Kerala. It is the location for the upcoming Thrissur Zoological Park Wildlife Conservation & Research Centre park.
