= Palathayi =

Village in Kerala, India

Palathayi is a small village near Kadavathur in Thalasserry, in Kannur district in Kerala. It is the part of Panoor village.

== Sacred groves ==
There are a number of sacred groves such as Palathayikunnu Bagavathi Temple is here in this village.

== Transportation ==
The national highway passes through Thalassery town. Goa and Mumbai can be accessed on the northern side and Cochin and Thiruvananthapuram can be accessed on the southern side. The road to the east of Iritty connects to Mysore and Bangalore. The nearest railway station is Thalassery on Mangalore-Palakkad line. Trains are available to almost all parts of India subject to advance booking over the internet. There are airports at Mangalore and Calicut. Both of them are international airports but direct flights are available only to Middle Eastern countries.
