= Thrissur Zoological Park Puthur =

Zoo in Thrissur, Kerala, India

Thrissur Zoological Park Wildlife Conservation & Research Centre
- Date opened: 28 October 2025
- Location: Puthur, Thrissur, Thrissur City
- Land area: 336 acres
- Memberships: CZA
- Major exhibits: Wildlife
- Website: www.museumandzoo.kerala.gov.inwww.tzp-cds.com

Thrissur Zoological Park Wildlife Conservation & Research Centre, commonly known as Thrissur Zoological Park, is a zoological park situated at Puthur, near Ollur in the city of Thrissur of the South Indian state of Kerala. It is India's first designer zoo and is also touted as one of the largest zoos in Asia. It is the first zoo in the state which is developed and managed by the Kerala Forest and Wildlife Department. The zoological park is set up as a replacement for Thrissur Zoo at a cost of Rs 300 crore on 350 acres of land by recreating the natural habitat of animals and birds. As of September 2026, the relocation of animals and the setup of all exhibits are being completed in a phased manner.

== History ==
The 13-acre Thrissur Zoo plot in the heart of the City of Thrissur where the zoo is currently located has been found unsuitable. Space constraints are affecting animals. Due to unavailability of Revenue Land, the zoo is being relocated to a 336-acre forest land in Puthur. Thereby, the management of the Zoo will be handed over to Department of Forests and Wildlife (Kerala) and it will not attract the stringent provisions of the Forest Conservation Act, 1980. The zoological park was announced for Thrissur in 2000 by the then Kerala Forest Minister K. Sudhakaran. The project is being set up in the 150 acres of forest land near Puthur. The zoological park is designed by Jon Coe, a leading international zoo designer from Australia. The zoo is being constructed up on 336 acres at Puthur at the estimated cost of Rs 130 crore.

The zoological park is being constructed in three phases. The Government of Kerala has released Rs 5 crore for the first phase of the zoological park in 2013 and would cost Rs 150 crores when it is completed. The funds will be also provided by the Central Government. In the first stage, ticket counter, construction of wall, sideways, canteen and enclosures to house animals were constructed. The enclosures will be in 10 acres. Shifting of animals from Thrissur Zoo was started after the enclosures were done. In the second phase, staff quarters and other facilities will be constructed. The total construction costs of the zoo may cost between Rs 300 to Rs 350 crores.

== Facilities ==
The main attraction of the new zoo is the special enclosures to exhibit wildlife in their natural habitat. Around 23 such places have been set up in Thrissur Zoological Park. Three of these are vast special habitats for different species of birds. It also has a veterinary hospital complex and feeding centers for animals. As of September 2026, the relocation of animals and the setup of all exhibits are being completed in a phased manner.

== See also ==
- Thrissur District

Thrissur Zoological Park Puthur Location Map
