= 2023 in Kerala =

- Centuries
- Decades: 2000s; 2010s; 2020s
- See also: List of years in Kerala; History of Kerala

Events in the year 2023 in Kerala.

== Incumbents ==
Photo	Post	Name
	The Governor of Kerala	Arif Mohammad Khan
	Chief minister of Kerala	Pinarayi Vijayan
	Chief Justice of Kerala High Court	S. Manikumar (till April 23)
	Chief Justice of Kerala High Court	Sarasa Venkatanarayana Bhatti (June 1- July 13)
	Chief Justice of Kerala High Court	Ashish Jitendra Desai (22 July - till date)

== Events ==
=== January ===
- January 3 - The 61st edition of Kerala School Kalolsavam commenced at Kozhikode. The event was conducted for the first time after COVID-19 pandemic and nearly 140,000 students participated in it.
- January 15 - One Day International match held between India and Sri Lanka at Greenfield International Stadium, Thiruvananthapuram with a low spectatorship of below one fifth the stadium capacity, owing to high ticket charges and disrespectful remarks by V. Abdurahiman.
- January 19 - Government of Kerala appoints former Indian National Congress leader K. V. Thomas as its special representative in New Delhi with cabinet rank and privileges.
- January 22 -
- PT - 7, a rogue wild elephant was tranquilized and captured by Wildlife Department, Government of Kerala near Dhoni, Palakkad.
- Kerala Police arrests Swathik Rahim in connection with Save Box Investment Scam.

=== February ===
- February 5 - An enquiry on fake birth certificate case in Kalamassery reveals incident of illegal adoption of a girl child with help of health workers that took place in Government Medical College, Ernakulam.
- February 11 - Viswanathan, a 46 year old tribal from Wayanad district was found dead in premises of Government Medical College, Kozhikode. It is alleged that he was abused and man handled accusing theft.
- February 14 - Enforcement Directorate arrests former Indian Administrative Service official M. Sivasankaran, a close confidant of Pinarayi Vijayan, the chief minister of Kerala in connection with Foreign Contribution (Regulation) Act, 2010 violations in Life Mission, a state funded housing project.
- February 17 - Biju Kurian a farmer from Kannur district who was part of a state government led delegation went absconding from Herzliya, Israel.
- February 22 - Enforcement Directorate attaches assets worth 305 crores of Joy Alukkas for Foreign Exchange Management Act violations and carrying out Hawala.
- February 23 - A statewide raid conducted by Vigilance & Anti-Corruption Bureau, Kerala finds that organized racket in state which siphons off money from Chief Minister Disaster Relief Fund (CMDRF).

=== March ===
- March 2 - Massive fire burst out at Brahmapuram waste treatment plant in Kochi.
- March 3 - Students' Federation of India (SFI) activists attacks Asianet News Network office at Kochi for telecasting a report regarding Narcotic Drugs & Psychotropic Substances abuse among school children.
- March 14 - Bhrahmapuram fire: Twelve day long fire at Bhrahmapuram was brought into control. The air quality index of Kochi hit historic low during the fire.
- March 15 - Scuffle took place outside speakers office of Kerala Legislative Assembly between Left Democratic Front (LDF) and United Democratic Front (UDF) legislators.
- March 18 -
  - Bhrahmapuram fire: National Green Tribunal slaps 100 crore penalty on Kochi Municipal Corporation.
  - A patient who was sedated for thyroid surgery was sexually assaulted in Government Medical College, Kozhikode.
- March 20 - Kerala High Court declares the election of A. Raja from Devikulam Assembly constituency null and void on the grounds of candidate producing fake caste certificate.
- March 23 - Rahul Gandhi, Member of Parliament from Wayanad Lok Sabha constituency gets disqualified following a criminal defamation conviction against him from a Surat court.
- March 29 - Kerala High Court takes an adverse stand on capture and caging of rogue wild tusker Arikomban. Court leaves the matter to expert panel and suggests relocation of Chinnakanal settlement to reduce human-wildlife conflict.

=== April ===
- April 2 - Eight passengers sustained burn injuries after an unidentified person set co-passengers on fire on board an express train in Elathur, Kozhikode which was bound for Kannur. Later the incident, three people including a two-year-old girl, were found dead on a railway track.
- April 4 - Elathur train attack: Maharashtra Police arrested Shahrukh Saif a Shaheen Bagh native who is the prime accused in Elathur train attack case from Ratnagiri, Maharashtra.
- April 5 - Mannarkkad special court for Scheduled Caste and Scheduled Tribe (Prevention of Atrocities) Act, 1989 which convicted 14 accused of Attappadi Madhu lynching case pronounces punishments for the guilty.
- April 6 - Anil Antony, son of A. K. Antony joins Bharatiya Janata Party.
- April 25 - Narendra Modi, the Prime Minister of India inaugurates Kerala's first Vande Bharat Express, Kasaragod - Thiruvananthapuram Vande Bharat Express and Kochi Water Metro.
- April 29 - Kerala wildlife department successfully tranquillised and captured rogue wild elephant Arikomban from Chinnakanal and released into Periyar National Park.

=== May ===
- May 7 - A tourist boat overturned in Tanur beach, Malappuram which resulted in the death of 22 people .
- May 11 - A doctor named Vandana Das was stabbed to death while she was on hospital duty.
- May 12 - Narcotics Control Bureau makes its biggest drug seizure in history in territorial waters off Kerala coast. Methamphetamine valuing Rs. 12,000 crores were seized from a Pakistan origin vessel.
- May 13 -
  - Three persons, including a firefighter, sustained injuries, albeit minor ones, after a major fire broke out at a multi-storey commercial building at the Kerala Industrial Infrastructure Development Corporation (KINFRA) Export Promotion Industrial Park, near InfoPark, at Kakkanad, Kochi.
  - A migrant worker from Bihar was lynched to death at Kondotty due to suspicion of theft.
  - A seventeen-year-old girl named Asmiya was found dead in mysterious circumstances in a Madrasa at Balaramapuram, Thiruvananthapuram.
- May 17 -
  - Government of Kerala passes an ordinance to ensure safety of health professionals.
  - SFI's Kattakada area secretary A. Visakh attempts impersonation to clinch post of University Union Councilor (UUC) to University of Kerala that was electorally won by a student named A.S. Anakha from Christian College, Kattakada.

=== June ===
- June 2 - A graduate student named Sradha Satheesh commits suicide in Amal Jyothi College of Engineering, Kanjirappally.
- June 3 - A group of men who claim themselves to be members of 'All Kerala Mens Association' welcomes and garlands Savad Sha, a man who was accused and jailed for two weeks in a case of public flashing in Kochi.
- June 5 - Kerala Fiber Optic Network was inaugurated by Pinarayi Vijayan, the chief minister of Kerala.
- June 6 - A controversy erupts after SFI leader P.M. Arsho from Maharaja's College, Ernakulam, who has not attended his third semester university exam since he was in jail, got declared as pass in the results announced in the university website.
- June 7 - A case was registered against former SFI leader K.Vidya for producing forged certificates to secure teaching job at Rajiv Gandhi Memorial Govt. Arts & Science College, Attappadi.
- June 8 - A delegation comprising Pinarayi Vijayan and his family, K. N. Balagopal, A. N. Shamseer, and staff leave for a 10-day visit to the United States and Cuba.
- June 9 - Inauguration of construction works of the Munambam – Azhikode Bridge.
- June 11 - Pinarayi Vijayan addresses Loka Kerala Sabha in Times Square, New York.
- June 14 - Chief Judicial Magistrate Court Ernakulam accepted to file a case against an illegal organ transplantation taken place at Lakeshore Hospital, Kochi in 2009.
- June 15 - Pinarayi Vijayan-led delegation makes first ever chief ministerial visit from India to Cuba.
- June 16 - SFI's Alappuzha district committee member Nikhil Thomas is accused of securing admission for Master of Commerce in Milad-E-Sherief Memorial College, Kayamkulam by producing fake degree certificate of Kalinga University.
- June 21 - Kerala Police arrests K. Vidya, accused in certificate forgery case from a Communist Party of India (Marxist) (CPIM) sympathisers house at Kozhikode.
- June 22 - Income Tax Department raids prominent Internet celebrities in Kerala.
- June 23 - Kerala Pradesh Congress Committee president K. Sudhakaran arrested in connection with acquaintance with Monson Mavunkal.
- June 25 - CPIM affiliated trade union, Centre of Indian Trade Unions (CITU) workers assault a bus owner in Kottayam after preventing him to operate his bus for weeks in name of labour issues and defying a court order in favour of the operator.

=== July ===
- July 3 - Kerala Police conducts raid and seized computers from office of a digital media company 'Marunadan Malayali' following complaints against its owner Shajan Scaria by P. V. Srinijin MLA.
- July 10 - The residents of Muthalapozhi, a coastal village in Thiruvananthapuram district and local Latin Catholic church protests against unscientific construction of breakwater that is repeatedly causing deaths of fishermen in the area.
- July 15 - CPIM conducts a national seminar in Kozhikode against Uniform Civil Code (UCC).
- July 16 - Kerala Police's cyber cell recovers Rs. 40,000 that was swindled from a Kozhikode native in an internet fraud by using artificial intelligence based deepfake technology. It is first reported case of artificial intelligence based cybercrime in the state.
- July 21 - Ananthapuri FM 101.9 which had a large listener base in and around Thiruvananthapuram district was closed down by Ministry of Information and Broadcasting.
- July 25 - Kerala Police books a case for mike howling during Pinarayi Vijayan's speech in Oommen Chandy's condolence meeting in Thiruvananthapuram and impounds mic and amplifier.
- July 28 - A man from Pathanamthitta district named Noushad, who was missing since last 18 months, found alive at Thodupuzha, a day after his wife Afsana, who filed the missing case, was booked on charges of murder of missing person by Kerala Police.
- July 29 - A five-year-old girl from Bihar was abducted and killed in Aluva. The police arrested a migrant worker in connection with the rape and murder.

=== August ===
- August 2 - Nair Service Society organised a nama japa yatra to protest against remarks made by A. N. Shamseer against Ganesha.
- August 4 - A pharmacist impersonates as a hospital nurse and attempts to murder mother of a newborn through air embolism in Parumala over alleged relationship issues former had with later's husband.
- August 9 - Malayala Manorama breaks news about details of Interim Board of Settlement proceedings that confirmed Pinarayi Vijayan's daughter Veena Vijayan getting illegal graft from Cochin Minerals and Rutile Limited.
- August 23 - Enforcement Directorate conducts raids on A. C. Moideen in connection with 100 crore worth Karuvannoor Cooperative Bank fraud.
- August 24 - A college girl who went missing from Kozhikode was found abused, naked and tied up inside a house in Thottilpalam, Kozhikode.
- August 28 - Achu Oomen, the daughter of former chief minister Oommen Chandy files complainer against concerted cyberbullying against her and her profession by CPIM followers during campaign for the by-election to Puthuppally Assembly constituency.
- August 29 - Actor Jayasurya criticised delay in payment of dues to paddy farmers by Kerala State Civil Supplies Corporation against Paddy Receipt Sheets and diversion of quality produce from state markets. The actor faced cyberbullying from left sympathisers following this.

=== September ===
- September 1 -
  - Spencer's, a century old supermarket chain, ends its operations in Kerala.
  - Kerala Motor Vehicles Department (MVD) prevents Robin Travels from operating bus service between Pathanamthitta and Coimbatore.
- September 5 - Government of Kerala transfers land 12,700 hectares of land from Kuttampuzha to Edamalakkudy resulting in Idukki district becoming the largest district in Kerala.
- September 12 - Nippah cases registered in Kozhikode 2 Patients died earlier was diagnosed by nippah virus.
- September 14 - Kerala Legislative Assembly unanimously passes Kerala Government Land Assignment (Amendment) Bill, 2023 which legalise construction on pattayam (title) land.

=== October ===
- October 13 - Enforcement Directorate attached assets worth Rs. 57.7 crores in relation with Karuvannoor cooperative society scam under Prevention of Money Laundering Act, 2002.
- October 14 - Mini cloudburst caused floods in and around Thiruvananthapuram.
- October 15 - Pinarayi Vijayan flags in the first ship to Vizhinjam International Seaport, Thiruvananthapuram.
- October 16 - MVD stops Robin bus from conducting trip to Coimbatore following All India Tourist Permit for the second time.
- October 26 - Indian Union Muslim League conducts India's largest Pro-Palestine rally at Kozhikode. Shashi Tharoor faced criticism for condemning Hamas in this meet.
- October 29 - A series of improvised explosive device took place during a convention of Jehovah’s Witnesses in Kalamassery, Kochi.

=== November ===
- November 7 - A Non Resident Indian investor who invested 25 crores in a sports complex stages protest at Manjoor against Local government who is delaying project through Red tape.
- November 8 - Enforcement Directorate conducts raid on officials of Communist Party of India supported Kandala Cooperative Bank, Kattakada for 101 crore worth Money laundering.
- November 11 - CPIM conducts massive pro-palestine - Anti-Zionist rally in Kozhikode in protest of Gaza war.
- November 17 - Income Tax Department raids prominent contractors linked with LDF and Kerala Police in Thiruvananthapuram unearthing black money based in United Arab Emirates worth more than 100 crores.
- November 18 - Nava Kerala Sadas commence at Kasaragod district.
- November 19 - MVD slapped fine at five locations on Robin bus while attempting to conduct Pathanamthitta - Coimbatore service using All India Tourist Permit for the third time. The bus was seized by Government of Tamil Nadu on completion of trip.
- November 24 - MVD seized controversial Robin bus on reaching back from Coimbatore.
- November 25 - A huge stampede occurred during a music concert in Cochin University of Science and Technology (CUSAT) which caused the death of 4 students.
- November 27 - A six-year-old girl was kidnapped in Oyoor to be found 21 hours later.

=== December ===
- December 9 - Crowd control by Kerala Police failed in Sabarimala Temple resulting in 18 hours long queue and death of a minor girl.
- December 10 - Kerala Students Union hurls shoes on Pinarayi Vijayan’s convoy at Ernakulam district.
- December 11 - SFI activists attacks Arif Mohammad Khan, the governor of Kerala on his way to Thiruvananthapuram International Airport. Kerala Police faces criticism for intelligence failure and drawing up a weak chargesheet by omitting Section 124 of Indian Penal Code.
- December 14 - POSCO Fast Track Court, Kattappana acquits the sole accused in a rape and murder of a six-year-old girl citing defects in investigation by Kerala Police. The accused was a Democratic Youth Federation of India (DYFI) worker.
- December 20 - Kerala cabinet decides to set up Kerala Urban Commission.
- December 22 - DYFI leaders attacks Kerala Police and vandalised their jeep at Chalakudy.
- December 30 - Leading Social Media Influencer and Fastest Performing Cartoonist Dr. Jitheshji was appointed as the International Brand Ambassador of India's best Tourism village award winning Kanthalloor Grama Panchayath.

== Deaths ==
=== January - June ===
- January 4 - Beeyar Prasad, poet, 62
- February 22 - Subi Suresh, comedian, 41.
- March 26 - Innocent, actor, 75.
- April 7 - Kalamandalam Devaki, Ottan Thullal dancer, 76
- April 23 - Gemini Sankaran, circus entrepreneur, 98.
- April 26 - Mamukkoya, actor, 76.
- May 1 - M. Chandran, former MLA, 76.
- May 16 - P. K. R. Pillai, film producer, 92
- June 5 - Sudhi Kollam, actor and comedian, 39.
- June 18 - Poojappura Ravi, actor, 86
- June 20 - M. A. Kuttappan, former minister, 76.
- June 26 - C. V. Dev, actor, 83
- June 27 - P. Chitran Namboodirippad, writer, 103

=== July ===
- July 7 - K. M. Vasudevan Namboothiri, painter, 97
- July 8 - K. Ravindranathan Nair, industrialist and film producer, 90.
- July 18 - Oommen Chandy, former Chief minister, 79.
- July 31 - Vakkom Purushothaman, former governor, 96.

=== August ===
- August 8 - Siddique Ismail, film director, 69.

=== September ===
- September 16 - C. R. Omanakuttan, writer, 80.
- September 24 - K. G. George, film maker, 77.
- September 28 - M. S. Swaminathan, father of Green Revolution in India, 98.

=== October ===
- October 5 - Anathalavattom Anandan, politician, 86.
- October 10 - Karthyayani Amma, woman who passed literacy test at 96 with top mark, 101.
- October 13 - P. V. Gangadharan, film producer, 80.
- October 17 - Kundara Johny, actor, 71.

=== November ===
- November 9 - Kalabhavan Haneef, actor, 63.
- November 21 - R. Ramachandran, politician, 71.
- November 30 - Subbalakshmi, carnatic musician and actress, 87
- November 30 - P. Cyriac John, former minister, 90

=== December ===
- December 3 - M. Kunjaman, economist, 74
- December 8 - Kanam Rajendran, CPI state secretary, 73
- December 15 - K. P. Viswanathan, former minister, 83

== See also ==
- History of Kerala
- 2022 in Kerala
- 2023 in India
