= Kolukkumalai =

- village
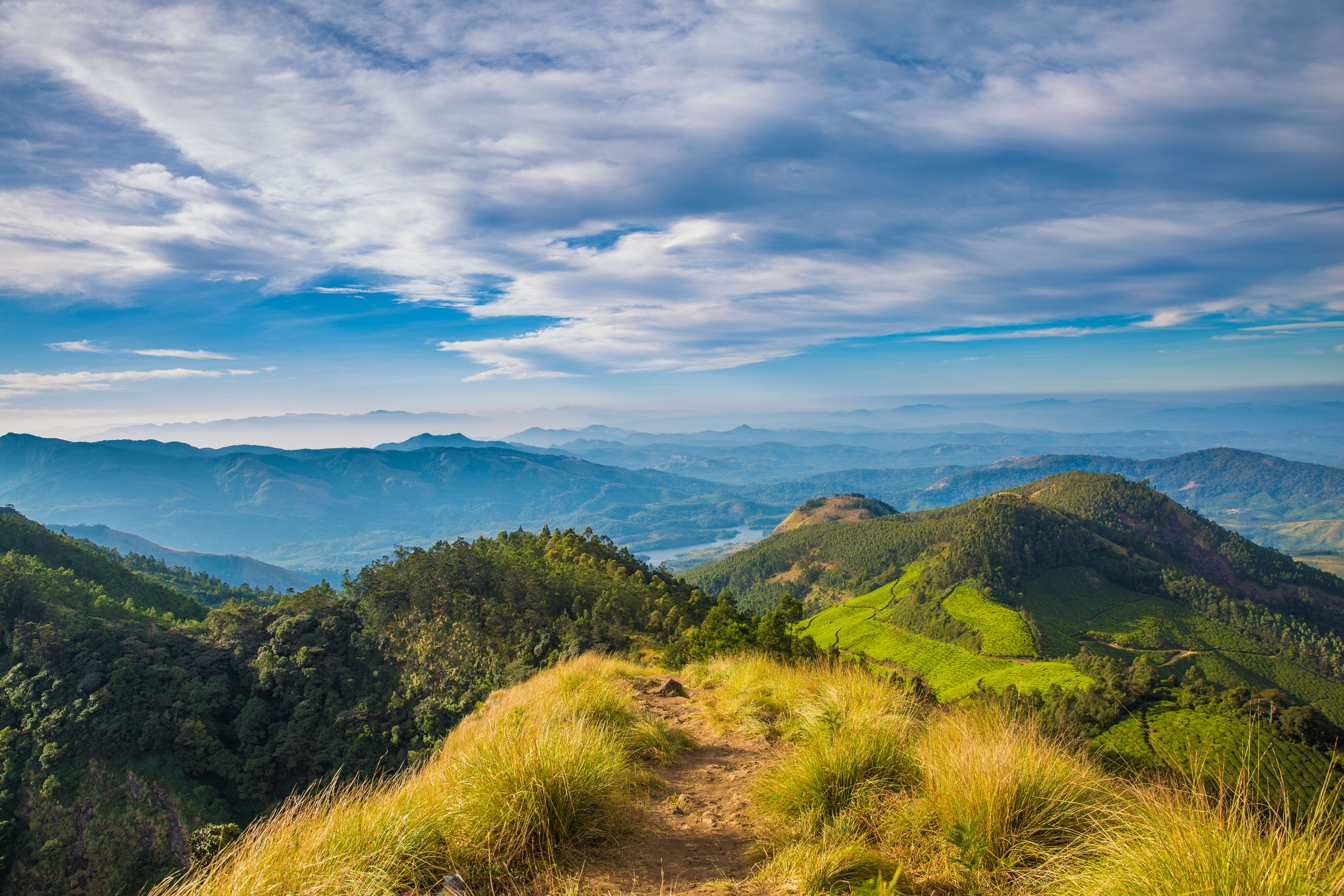
- The View of Western Ghats from the Kolukkumalai Peak

- Location within Tamil Nadu Location within India
- Coordinates: 10.075°N 77.221°E
- Country: India
- State: Tamil Nadu
- District: Theni

Government
  - Body: Panchayath
- Elevation: 2,160 m (7,090 ft)

Languages
  - Official: Tamil
- Time zone: UTC+5:30 (IST)
- PIN: 625582
- Vehicle registration: TN-60

Kolukkumalai is a small village/hamlet in Bodinayakanur Taluk in the Theni district of the Indian state of Tamil Nadu. It is home to the highest tea plantation in the world with the tea grown here possessing a special flavour and freshness because of the high altitude. It is regularly reached from the Temple City of Madurai which is 140 Km in distance. The Tamilnadu state's tourism lists Kolukkumalai as one of the top destinations for Nature lovers. It is located near Munnar in Idukki district of Kerala.

== Geography ==
Kolukkumalai is about 7,130 feet (2,170 m) above sea level and lies some 32 kilometres (20 mi) from Munnar. The hill top village is accessible only by jeep due to rugged and rain drenched roads covering up to 17 kms. Kolukkumalai is located in Theni district of TamilNadu. The approach road is through Suryanelli near Munnar in Idukki district of Kerala.

=== Tourism ===
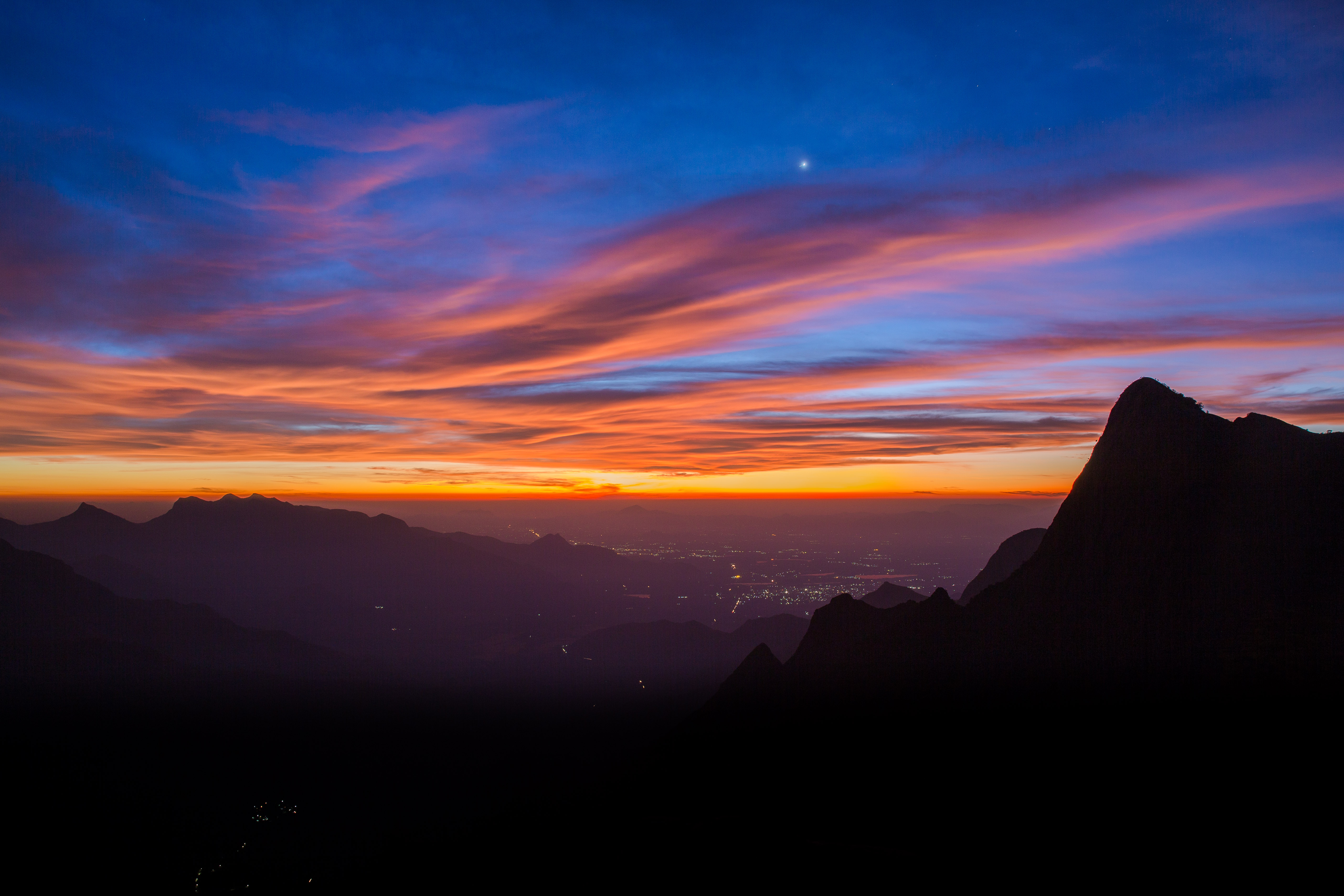
Sunrise view from Kolukkumalai

Visitor attractions include:

- Madurai
- Devikulam
- Chinnar Wildlife Sanctuary
- Munnar
- Idukki
- Thekkadi
- Theni
- Meesapulimala
- Kambam

== Colleges ==
- Cardamom Planters' Associations College, Bodinayakanur
- Government Engineering College, Bodinayakanur

== Schools ==
- P.U. Primary School Kurangani

== Administration and Politics ==
This place belongs to Kottagudi Panchayath of Bodinayakanur taluk of Tamilnadu State. It had 139 voters as on 2014. This village belongs to Bodinayakanur assembly seat. A TNSTC bus starts at 4 am in Theni towards Suryanelli which is the only bus from the state it belongs to. KSRTC buses run regularly to Suryanelli

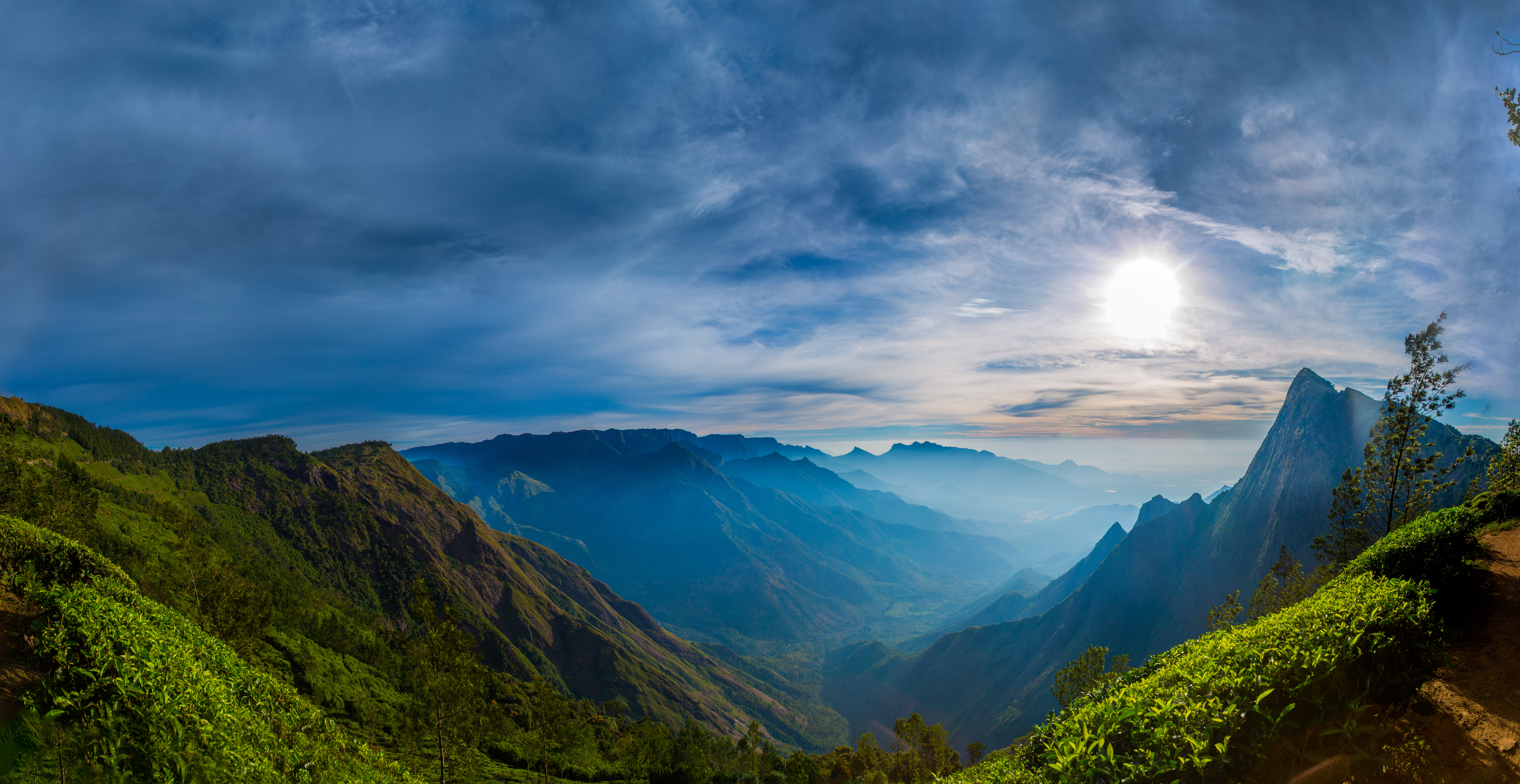
Panoramic View from the Kolukkumalai of the Theni Valley, Munnar

== See also ==
- Chinnakanal
- Munnar
