= Meesapulimala =

Peak in India

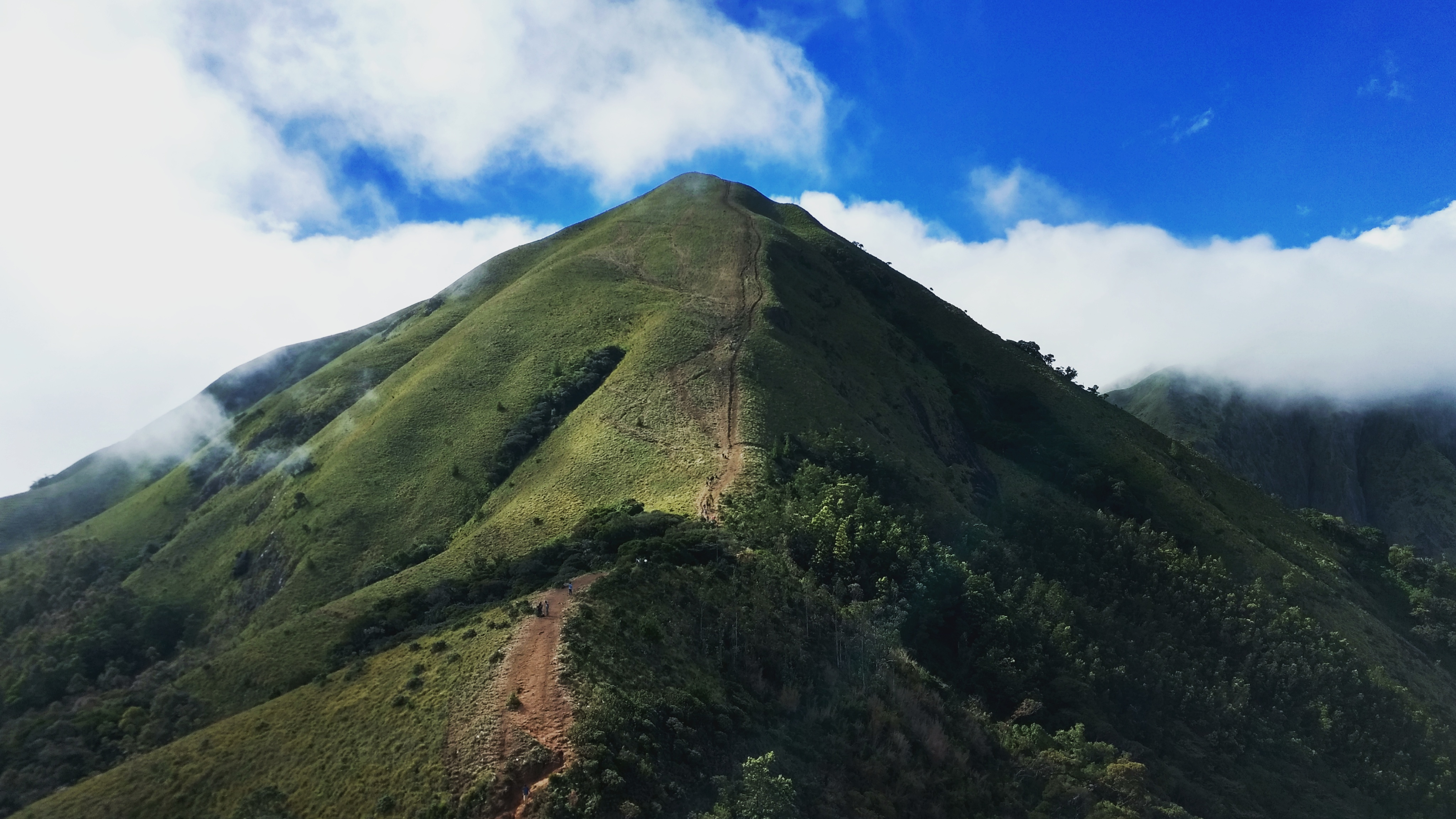

Highest point
- Elevation: 2,640 m (8,660 ft)
- Coordinates: 10°05′51″N 77°12′12″E

Geography
- Location within Kerala Location within India
- Location: Meeshapulimala, Kerala
- Parent range: Western Ghats

Climbing
- Easiest route: Kochi → Adimaly → Munnar → Meesapulimala

Meesapulimala is an Indian peak, the next south of the second highest peak (Manna Malai 2,659 metres (8,724 ft)) of the Western Ghats on the border of Idukki district, Kerala state and Theni district, Tamil Nadu. Its peak is 2,640 metres (8,661 ft) above sea level. The name derives from the peak's resemblance to a leopard with whiskers (meesa - mustache; puli - leopard; mala - hill/mountain). It is located in between the Anaimalai Hills and Palani Hills near Suryanelli around 20 km away from Munnar. The Kolukkumalai tea estate, Top Station and Tipadamala (2135 m) is also nearby.

Treks to the peak via Rhodo Valley (favourable for rhododendron flowers) can be organized through the Kerala Forest Development Corporation in Munnar. The trekking path from Kolukkumalai to Meesapulimala is highly restricted.

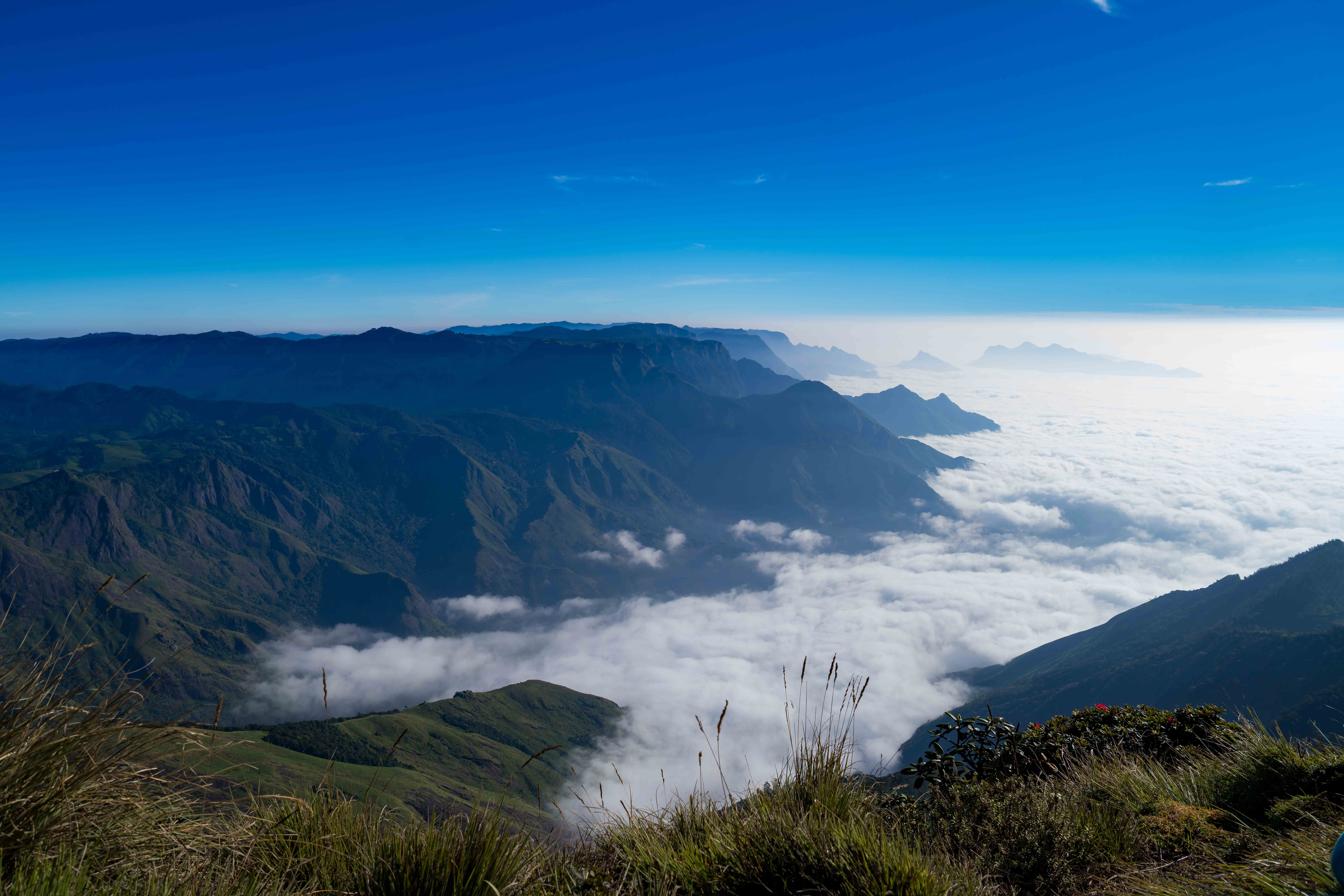
The Morning view of the valley of Kottakudi, Tamil Nadu from the peak of Meesapulimala

Wildlife including the Nilgiri tahr, sambar deer, wild gaur, wild dogs and even the sloth bear.
