= Rajakumari, Idukki district =

Rajakumari
- village
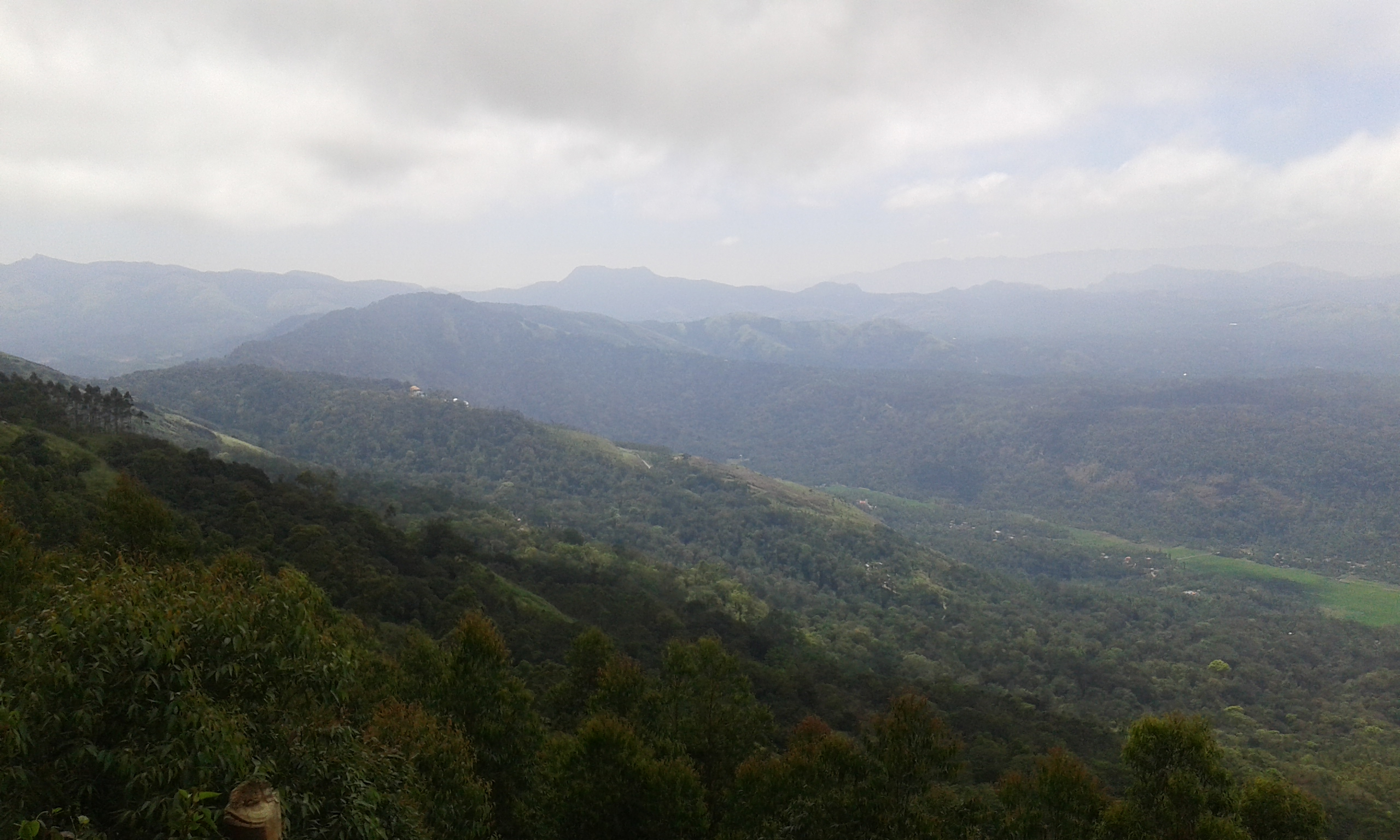
- Rajakumari seen from the northwest. Taken from Gap Road in Chinnakanal.

- Location in Kerala, India
- Coordinates: 9.973453°N 77.168647°E
- Country: India
- State: Kerala
- District: Idukki

Area
  - Total: 44.54 km^{2} (17.20 sq mi)
- Elevation: 1,061 m (3,481 ft)

Population (2011)
  - Total: 16,253
  - Density: 364.9/km^{2} (945.1/sq mi)

Languages
  - Official: Malayalam, English
- Time zone: UTC+5:30 (IST)
- PIN: 685619
- Telephone code: 04868
- Vehicle registration: KL 37 KL 69
- Nearest city: Nedumkandam
- Lok Sabha constituency: Idukki
- Vidhan Sabha constituency: Udumbanchola
- Climate: Moderate Cold, fine climate (Köppen)

Rajakumari is a village in Idukki district in the Indian state of Kerala.

== Demographics ==
As of 2011 Census, Rajakumari had a population of 16,253 with 8,127 males and 8,126 females. Rajakumari village has an area of 44.54 km^{2} (17.20 sq mi) with 4,233 families residing in it. In Rajakumari, 8.8% of the population was under 6 years of age. Rajakumari had an average literacy of 89.5% higher than the national average of 74% and lower than state average of 94%.

== Economy ==
Rajakumari is one of the few places in Kerala where all kinds of crops are grown. The main Cultivations of Rajakumari are cardamom and pepper.

== Education Institutions ==
- NSS College, Rajakumari
- Montfort valley school, Muruckumthotty
- St Marys central school, Rajakumari
- Mar Basil, Senapathi
- St Seorge public school, Kuruvilacity
- Mar Mathews public school, Muruckumthotty

== Gallery ==
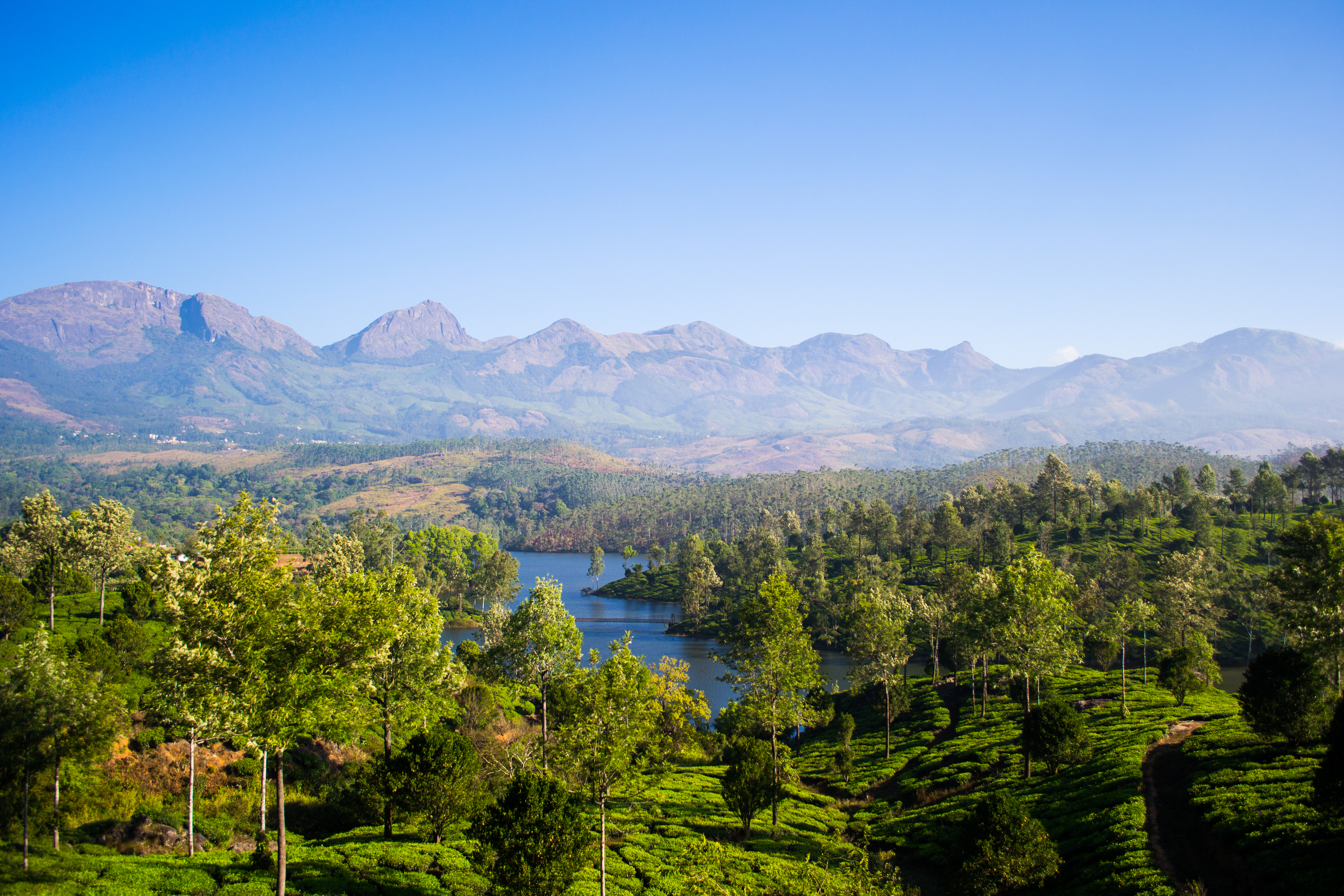
Views from the northeastern end area of Rajakumari village. Chinnakanal village in the background.

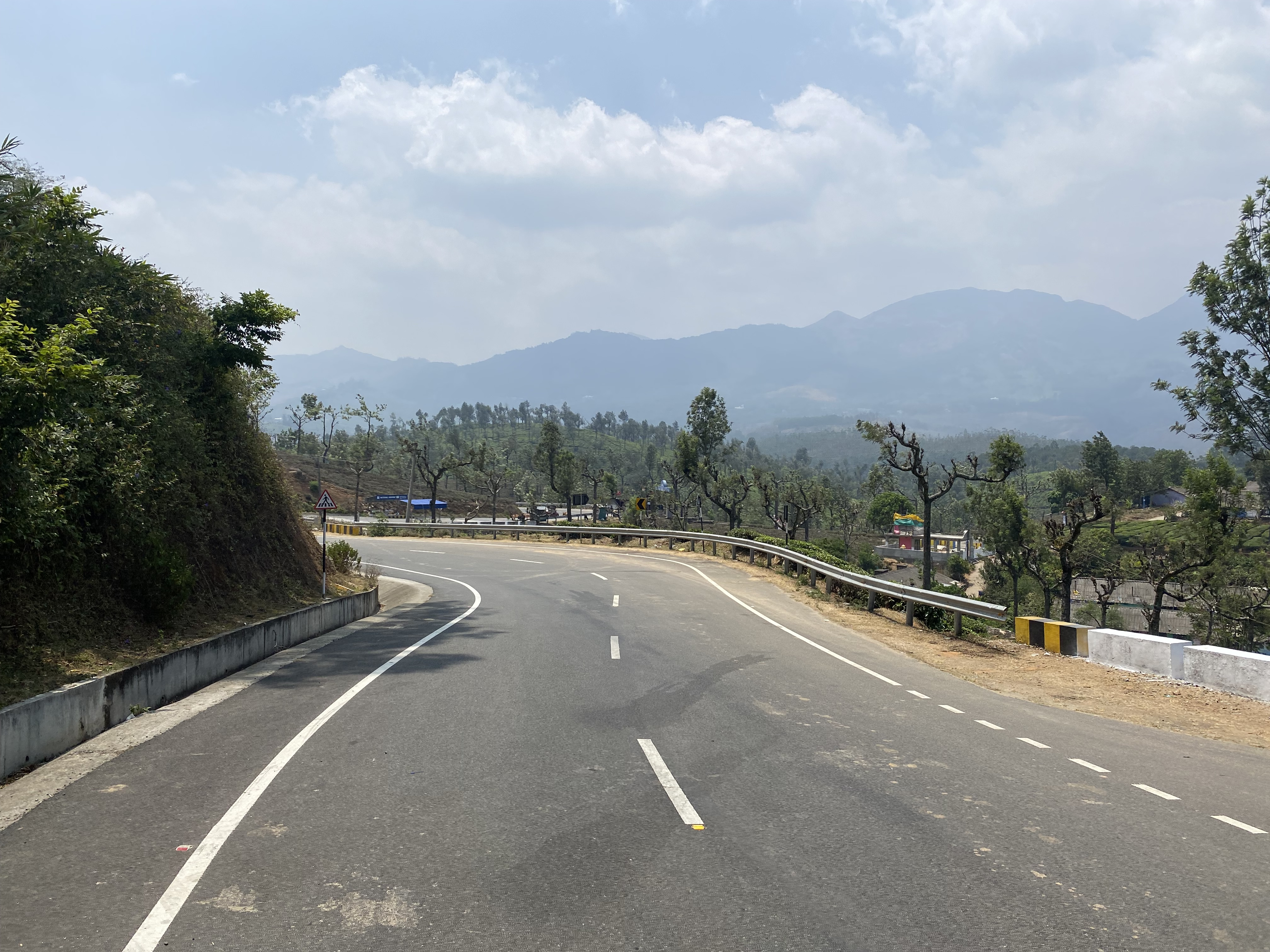
National Highway 85 in Rajakumari
