= Padayappa (disambiguation) =

Padayappa is a 1999 Indian Tamil film directed by K. S. Ravikumar and starring Rajinikanth.

Padayappa may also refer to:

- Padayappa (soundtrack), by A. R. Rahman for the 1999 film
- Padayappa (elephant), Indian elephant in Kerala named after the film
