= KFON =

KFON may refer to:

- KFON (FM), a radio station (93.9 FM) licensed to serve Groveton, Texas, United States
- KJFK (AM), a radio station (1490 AM) licensed to serve Austin, Texas, which held the call sign KFON from 1993 to 2012
- K-FON, high-speed Internet connectivity system in Kerala, India
