= Suryanelli =

Resort in Kerala, India

Suryanelli Sooryanelli, Suryanelly
- Hill Station
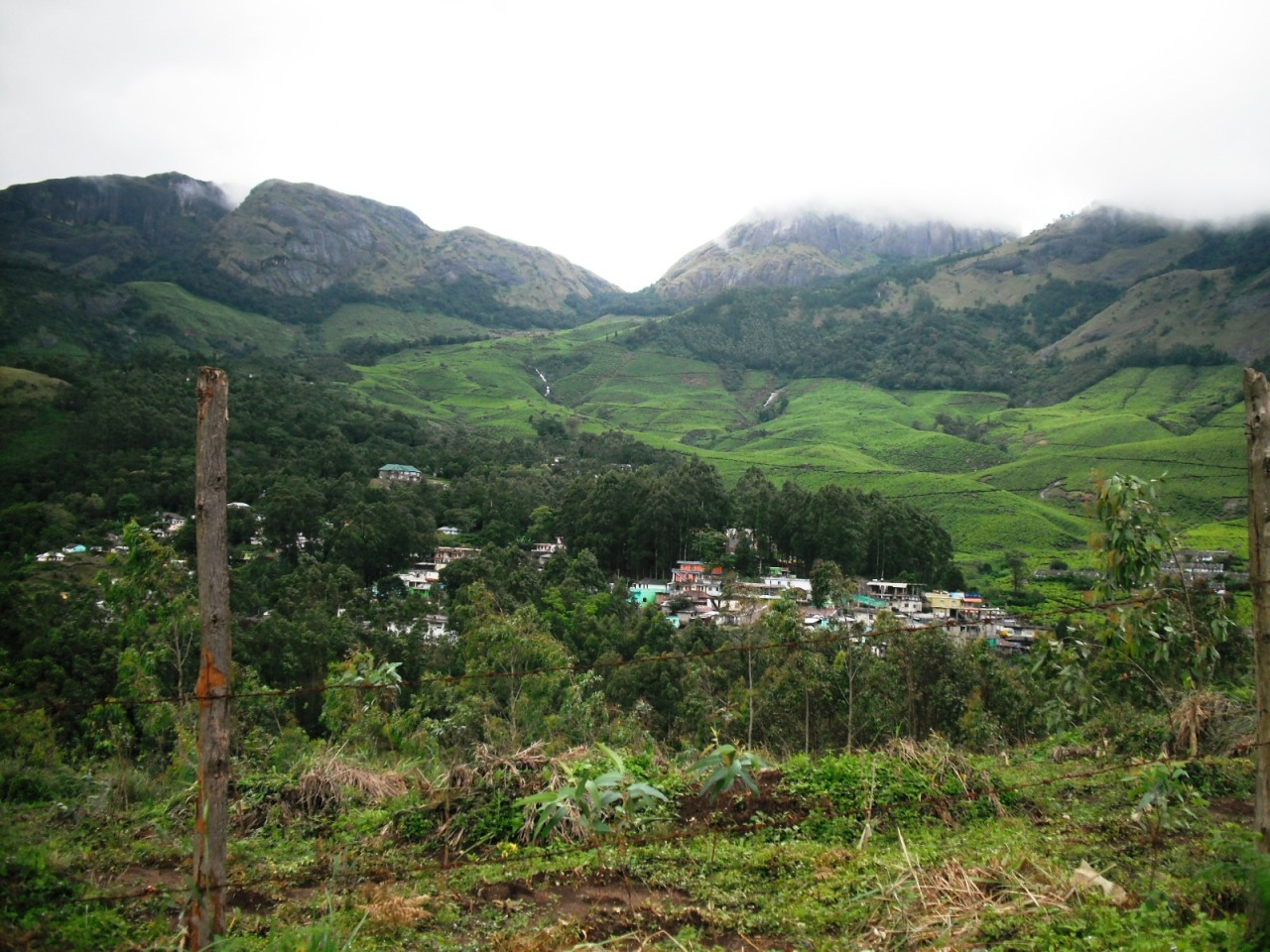
- Suryanelli in 2011

- Location within Kerala Location within India
- Coordinates: 10°03′03″N 77°11′39″E
- Country: India
- State: Kerala
- District: • Idukki
- Elevation: 1,412 m (4,633 ft)

Languages
  - Official: Malayalam, English
  - Spoken: Malayalam, Tamil
- Time zone: UTC+5:30 (IST)
- PIN: 685 618
- Telephone code: 04868-
- Vehicle registration: KL-69

Suryanelli is a resort settlement in the Chinnakanal village in Idukki district, Kerala, India. Situated 40 km southeast of Munnar. It is surrounded by tea plantations and several resorts.

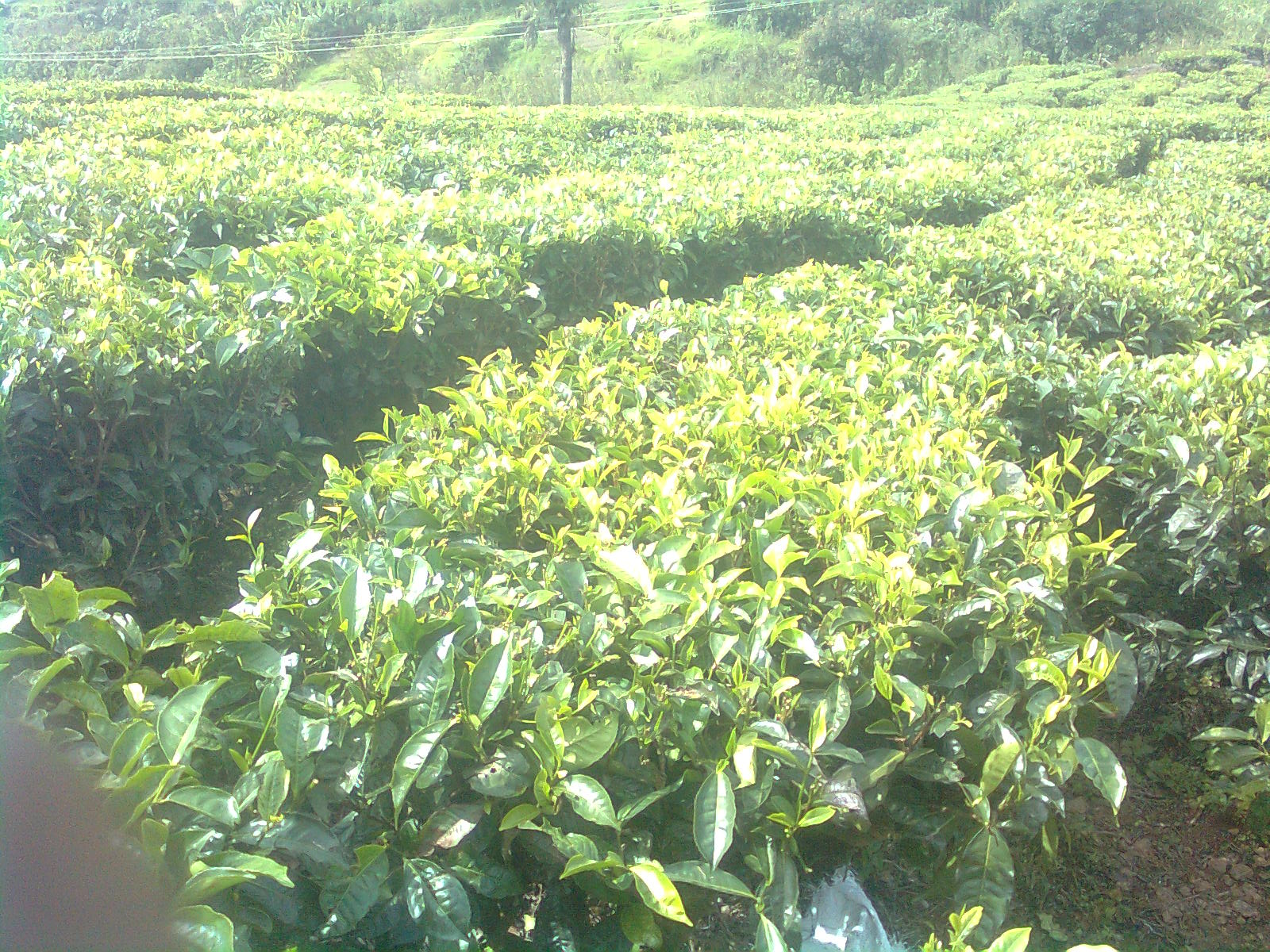
Tea estates

== Etymology ==
Suryanelli is a name derived from two words suryan, from Sanskrit सूर्य, and Tamil இல்லை, which literally translates as 'no sun'.

Long before the human settlements formed this placed used to be on the way to Sabarimala and it was a densely forested area. The tree were so dense that it almost covered the ground devoid of any sunlight.

== Geography ==
Situated at 1,412 m (4,633 ft) from mean sea level in the southern Western Ghats it receives a very high rainfall. The maximum rains are brought in by the South-west Monsoon. It has a very pleasant climate throughout the year. However, the temperature drops drastically when the weather gets windy.

=== Water-Bodies ===
Since it is on the slopes of the western ghats, Suryanelli is fed with may streams and rivers. Most of these streams dry up during peak summer months or Late April and Early May. However, the waterfalls near the Chinnakanal power house never dries up. There is a clear view of the Anayirangal Dam from Suryanelli. Bathing and swimming in these are highly restricted because of the water being used for drinking purpose.

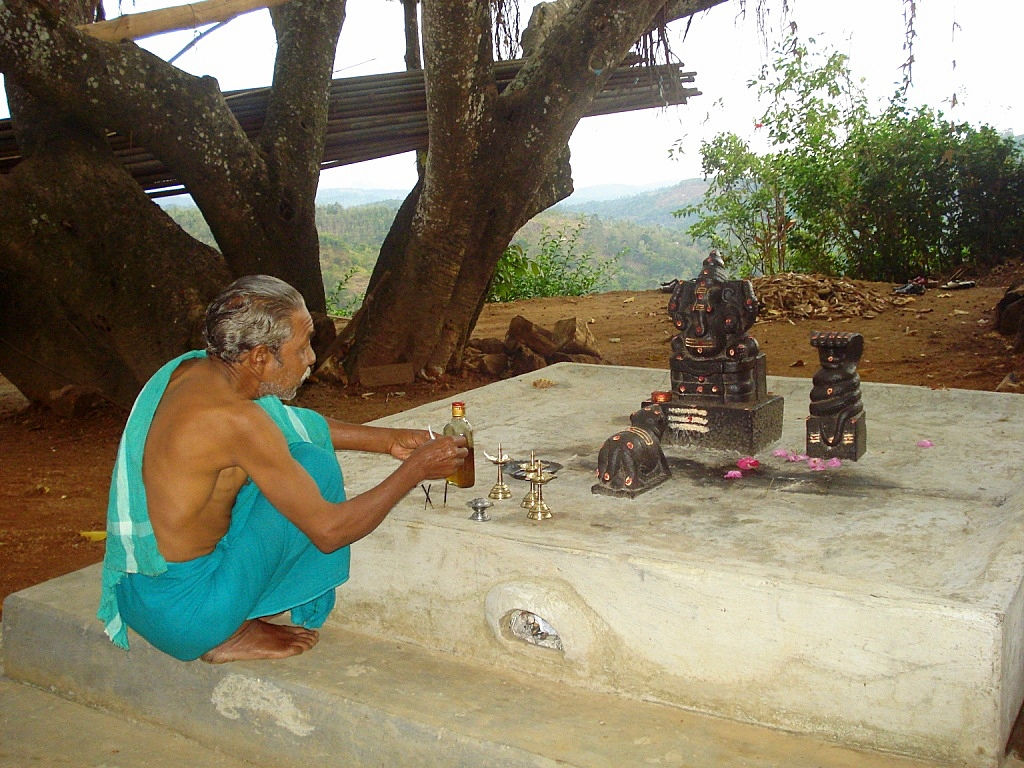
Tribal Temple at Rajakumari

=== Languages ===
The Major Languages are Malayalam and Tamil. However the locals are conversant in English and Hindi due to the heavy influx of tourists.

=== Places of Worship ===
Suryanelli has many small temples, the main one being a Lord Ganesha Temple. There is a prominent Roman Catholic Church and a Protestant Church.

=== Economy ===
Majority of the locals work in the adjacent Plantations, both tea and cardamom. Some of them are in the hospitality sector, working in the resorts and as tourist guides. Some work as transporters both cargo and passenger.

=== Health care ===
Suryanelli has a 20 bedded primary health center cum hospital run by the plantation catering to the needs of the hospital. The hospital conducts frequent health check-up and awareness programs.

== Education ==
Suryanelli as a village has a very high literacy rate. There are many state-run schools in and around the There is a high end private Montfort School. Munnar Catering College is a prestigious hospitality residential college in Suryanelli.

== Transport ==
Suryanelli is well connected to both the western and eastern foothills. The Closest International Airport is Kochi International Airport. which is 134 km away and the major railway junction is on the other-side at Madurai at 137 km. However, going towards cities Tamil Nadu takes lesser time as the road quality is better. The nearest town in the Tamil Nadu side is Bodinayakanur and Theni, where as on the Kerala side is Kothamangalam and Aluva.

Suryanelli is well connected to various places in Kerala and Tamil Nadu, by the state-run buses and taxi services. There are innumerable local jeep services to travel in and around the town all the way up to Bodinayakanur. Suryanelli is the base station for Kolukkumalai visit which has the highest tea plantation in the world.

== Flora and Fauna ==
Suryanelli is the midst of a very fragile ecosystem. Most of the surrounding places fall under the Reserve Forest Area. It is home to the highly endangered indigenous Nilgiri Tahr, Tigers, Asian Elephants, Red Squirrel, and various types of Birds. There is always an Animal - Human Conflict here especially with the elephants. The elephants raid the cardamom plantations and the human interference of their habitat during pilgrimage season of Sabarimala.

== Tourist Accommodations ==
Suryanellli is home to a variety of Tourist accommodations ranging from home-stays to high end resorts hotels. There are a few campsites too.
