= P. Chitran Namboodirippad =

Writer and educationist (1920–2023)

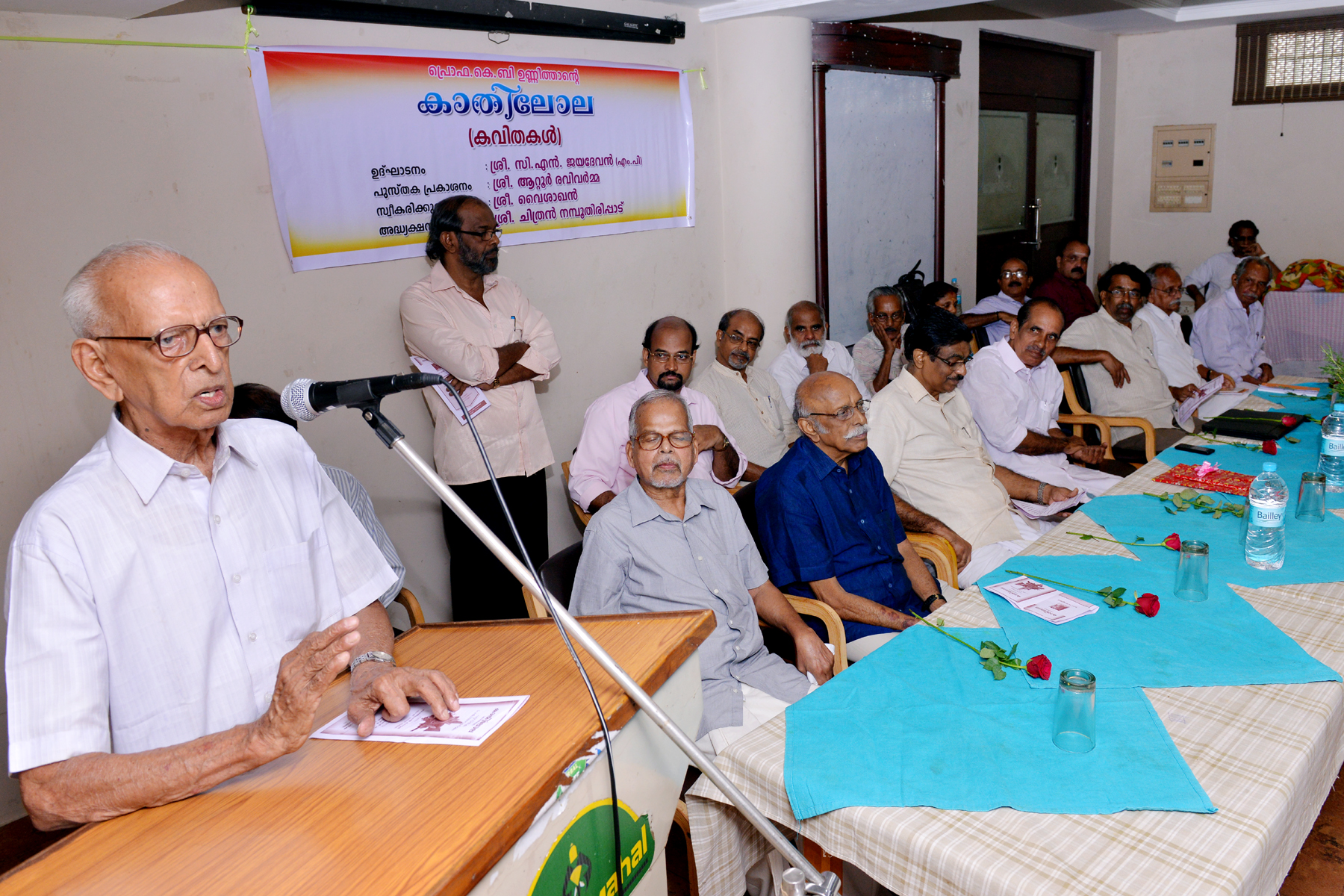
- Born: 6 January 1920; Mookkuthala, Malappuram district, British India
- Died: 27 June 2023 (aged 103)
- Education: A.V. High School, Ponnani St. Thomas College, Thrissur Pachaiyappa's College, Chennai
- Occupations: Educationist; Activist
- Employer(s): Department of Education, Government of Kerala
- Notable work: Punyahimalayam, Smaranakalude Poomukham
- Awards: Padma Sri, 2024

P. Chitran Namboodirippad (6 January 1920 – 27 June 2023) was an Indian writer, educationist and leading social activist from Kerala. He was a National Award-winning educationist and also a mountain man who trekked in the Himalayas for the 29th time even at his age of 99. Namboodirippad was honored by Justice P. Sathasivam, governor of Kerala on the occasion of his 99th birthday. Honoring his contributions to the field of education, the Government of India posthumously awarded the Padma Sri, India's third highest civilian honor in 2024.

== Personal life ==
Namboodirippad was born in an orthodox Namboodiri Illam, Pakaravoor Mana, Mookkuthala, Malappuram district, on 6 January 1920 to Pakaravoor Krishnan Somayajippad and Parvathy Antharjanam. His childhood was spent learning the vedas and ancient Brahminical scriptures. After completing his schooling from A.V. High School Ponnani and matriculation from St. Thomas College, Thrissur, Namboodirippad left for Chennai (then Madras) to pursue his graduation from Pachaiyappa's College, against the wishes of his father.

He married Leela Antharjanam of Koodallur Mana and had six children. Namboodirippad died on 27 June 2023, at the age of 103.

== Career ==
Namboodirippad was attracted to Communism while doing his Intermediate from the St. Thomas College, Thrissur. Prominent Communist thinker and leader K. Damodaran introduced him to the ideology. He was the first state secretary of All India Students' Federation in Kochi Kingdom.

After his graduation from Pachaiyappa's College, Chennai, Namboodirippad returned to his native village of Mookkuthala. He observed that children in the village had to travel long distances over foot and crossing rivers to Ponnani for basic education. Feeling the need, he established a school in a 5-acre plot, the first one in Mookkuthala in 1947. After the formation of the state of Kerala in 1956, Namboodirippad felt that the state government was best placed to maintain and expand the school and in 1957, he handed over the school to the Government of Kerala for a token amount of Rs. 1. The school is currently named in his memory as P. Chitran Namboodirippad Government Higher Secondary School, Mookkuthala.

After handing over the school to the government, Namboodirippad served the Department of Education, Government of Kerala until his retirement in 1978, as the Joint Director of Education. It was during this period, under his leadership the Youth Festival of Schools of Kerala was transformed into a grand event for promoting arts and cultural abilities among school children in a competitive environment. Currently this festival is one of the most important cultural events in Kerala and has gained national attention.

On retirement, he was appointed as the Secretary of Kerala Kalamandalam, (now Kerala Kalamandalam Deemed University) the iconic institution offering courses in traditional Kerala art forms like Kathakali, Koodiyattam, Mohiniyattam, among others. His astute administrative ability coupled with his knowledge and passion of traditional arts, helped Kerala Kalamandalam to attain global attention. He led a troupe of artists to West Europe and the United States, besides other states in India, and their performances were highly appreciated. During his period, Kerala Kalamandalam became an institution of eminence and began to attract scholars and students from foreign countries.

Upon retiring from service, Namboodiripad observed that the state of Service Pensioners in Kerala was miserable and felt the need for an organization to fight for their needs. He founded the Kerala State Service Pensioner's Union (KSSPU) for the purpose and the organization was at the forefront of fighting for the rights of pensioners in the state.

He was also the founding member of Bharathiya Vidya Bhavan, Thrissur chapter and was actively involved in its cultural and academic activities till his death.

In 1990, Namboodirippad embarked on a journey to the Himalayas, visiting major pilgrimage sites such as Kashi, Haridwar, Rishikesh, Badrniath, Kedarnath, Gangotri, and Yamunotri. Rediscovering his interest in traveling and mesmerized by the grandeur of the Himalayas, Namboodirippad continued to travel for the pilgrimage, continuing for 30 years untiil the age of 99. In the process, he built a community of travelers, who came together for a common cause and interest and was the Acharya of the pilgrimage group of Shree Sarada Ashram Nagercoil for a long time, until reaching his centenary.

== Books ==
Namboodirippad published a travelogue Punyahimalayam in 2007 about the travel of Himalayas and an autobiography Smaranakalude Poomukham.

== Awards ==
- 2022 – V.K. Narayana Bhattathiri Award
- 2024 – Padma Sri
