= Padayappa (elephant) =

Notable elephant in Kerala

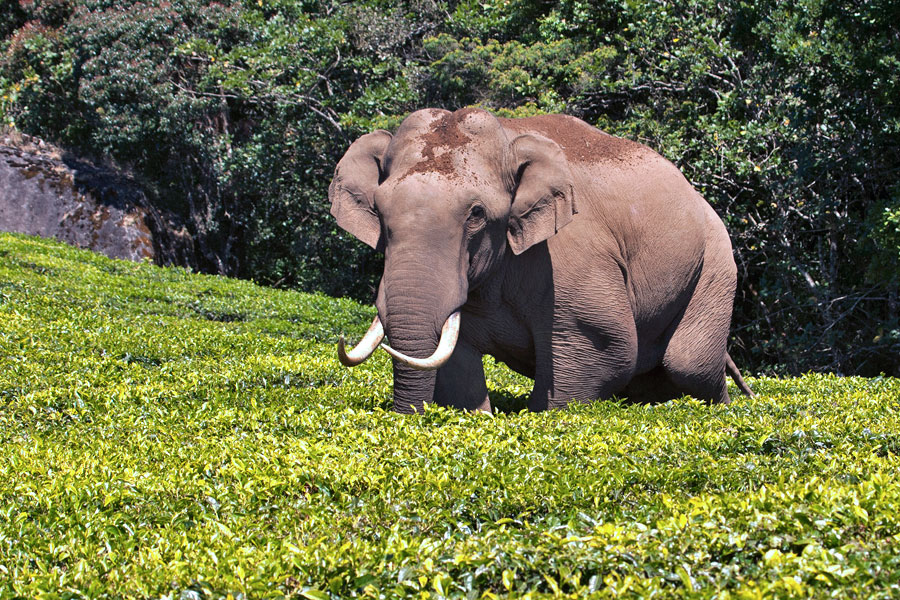
- Padayappa in a tea plantation
- Species: Elephas maximus (Asian elephant)
- Sex: Male
- Born: unknown
- Nationality: India
- Known for: Frequent appearances in residential areas
- Named after: Padayappa movie

Padayappa also known as Munnar Padayappa is a wild elephant in Munnar in the Indian state of Kerala, known for his frequent appearances in residential areas. Padayappa, who occasionally roams on populated areas and creates traffic blocks on highways, does not harass or become aggressive. The elephant's frequent visit to populated areas and cities as opposed to usual wild elephants and his calm nature caused him to attract wider media attention. Padayappa can be easily spotted because of his limp due to an injury on his hind leg and his unusually long tusks. He is named after the titular character in the 1999 Tamil film Padayappa. The elephant is identified by his name Padayappa even in the forest department circles. Padayappa came to the media's notice in 2015, when the elephant discovered a sackful of carrots that the shopkeepers had hidden from him by the riverside. Only after eating all the carrots did he head into the forests without attacking anyone. On 5 April 2022, Padayappa jumped in front of a KSRTC bus coming to Munnar. The driver stopped the bus and the elephant checked the bus with his trunk, scratching the window glass with his tusks. The driver sped off in the vehicle when Padayappa moved back a little.

== See also ==
- List of individual elephants
- Elephants in Kerala culture
- Arikomban
