= 2023 Elathur train attack =

Train attack in Kerala, India

The 2023 Elathur Train Attack occurred on the night of April 2, 2023, when a lone Islamic terrorist named Sharukh Saifi, a resident of Delhi set fire to coach number D1 of the Alappuzha-Kannur Express near Elathur railway station in Kozhikode district, Kerala, India. The incident resulted in the death of three passengers, including a child. Nine passengers sustained burn injuries.

== Incident ==
On 2 April 2023, at 9:30 PM local time, an unidentified man boarded the Alappuzha-Kannur Express without a reserved ticket and set fire to coach number D1 using inflammable liquid. Some passengers managed to douse the flames on time and help others move quickly to the next compartments, averting a major accident. The passengers hailing from Mattannur were those who reportedly jumped off the moving train to escape from the fire. The police recovered the bodies of three passengers, including a child, from the railway track near Elathur, who were reportedly killed while jumping off from the moving train to escape from the fire.

== Investigation ==
Police sources said there were strong reasons to suspect the attack was a premeditated one by the arsonist. The man who set fire to the compartment on Sunday at 9.30 p.m., following a heated exchange of words with the co-passengers, escaped from the spot with the help of another stranger.

Closed circuit television cameras from a nearby location caught him fleeing from the spot on a two-wheeler, allegedly arranged by the stranger. This was later found to be wrong, as the man was not the attacker, but a student. Senior police officers declined to confirm reports that the suspected man was taken into custody a few hours after the incident.

Eyewitnesses in the compartment stated that the attacker was pouring an inflammable liquid on the floor and setting it on fire. They said it was a close shave for nine passengers who sustained burn injuries and were admitted to various hospitals in Kozhikode City and Koyilandy. The police and RPF recorded the statements of the majority of the passengers to support the intensified probe. They also recovered a bag reportedly used by the arsonist to carry the inflammable liquid. There were two bottles of combustible liquid, reportedly petrol, to unleash the attack, the police said.

The police could not initially confirm whether the attacker targeted any particular individual or a group of passengers. At the same time, Railway Protection Force (RPF) sources said there were witnesses who expressed doubts over his plan to target a woman passenger in the group. Later, in September 2023, the National Investigation Agency filed a chargesheet against the main suspect in which they accused him of committing jihad and being motivated by extremist clerics based in Pakistan.
