= Bhrahmapuram fire =

Waste dumpyard fire in India

In March 2023, a major fire broke out at the 110-acre Bhrahmapuram landfill site at Bhrahmapuram in Vadavukot-Puthankurish Panchayat, 17 km from Kochi city. The fire began on 2 March 2023 at around three in the afternoon. Smoke rising from Bhrahmapuram made life difficult for the people of Ernakulam. Due to the high level of air pollution after the fire in Ernakulam district, many people experienced cough, difficulty in breathing, headache, dizziness, eye discomfort and itching. It took 12-13 days for the fire to be brought under control. Weeks after the devastating fire at the Brahmapuram landfill, another fire was reported on 26 March.

== Origin of fire ==
The fire brigade received information about the fire at 3.30 pm on 2 March 2023. In the district collector's report, the time reported was 4.15 pm. By the time, the locals arrived at the place within half an hour. The fire originated at the sector one. There were pocklines and excavators but no manpower to operate them. Garbages on the road made it impossible for fire rescue vehicles to pass to the spot. This was the fifth time that the garbage dump caught fire at Bhrahmapuram, but this time the condition of this fire was serious. Areas miles away from Bhrahmapuram were engulfed in smoke. Many people suffered from suffocation and dizziness and had to seek medical help. Many people and medias alleged that the situation was made worse by the failure of the authorities who did not take care to clear the garbage or prepare fire fighting systems despite giving accurate warnings.

== Efforts to extinguish fire ==
The 75-acre area where the fire broke out was divided into six zones and the fire fighting progressed. Fire units from Kochi Port Trust were also brought and tried to douse the fire along with Kerala Fire Force. They tried to put out the fire by pumping more water from Kadambarayar using pumps brought from Alappuzha. changing wind direction adversely affected firefighting efforts. Due to such strong winds, smoke was rising from the garbage heap. In the early days, efforts were made to stir up the waste by using earthmoving machines and dousing the fire with water. Water was also poured from the helicopter. During the night, 26 excavators and 8 JCBs were involved in digging the garbage. Water was pumped continuously. In the first days, 200 people of fire rescue service, 50 volunteers of civil defense, 35 corporation employees and police were engaged in smoke-extinguishing activities. Three ambulances were also camped. The district collector instructed that all excavators should be kept operational throughout the night. Night activities were coordinated by the sub collector and Deputy Collector camped at Bhrahmapuram.

== Allegations on corruption ==
Allegations of corruption of were raised regarding waste bio-mining contract at Bhrahmapuram waste plant. Demands were also raised for an independent probe into the scandal involving politicians, bureaucrats and the Sontra Infotech company. In 2019, the Chief Minister of Karnataka had ordered a vigilance investigation against Sontra Infotech. In 2020, the same company was given the Bhrahmapuram contract. Opposition parties alleged that the Sontra Infratech got the contract after a special intervention from KSIDC. They also asked the Government of Kerala that where did the proposal to extend the contract to the company that did not complete even half of the work within the contract period come from. Allegations were raised that a huge corruption took place in the Kochi Corporation under the guise of a garbage disposal contract, and that the contract was awarded to the children and sons-in-law of the leaders of political parties and the people of Kochi were the ultimate sufferers.
