= Bhrahmapuram landfill =

Waste dumping yard in Kochi, India

Coordinates: 10.0000°N 76.3700°E

Brahmapuram landfill is an overfilled waste dumping site located in the Indian city of Kochi, Kerala. The Brahmapuram Solid Waste plant located here is owned and operated by the Kochi Corporation. The site is a major source of environmental pollution, fire hazards, and public health and safety issues. The Kochi city produces more than 600 tons of waste per day and nearly 100 ton of it is decomposed at Brahmapuram Solid Waste plant into organic manure. The plant which was inaugurated in 2008 to manage solid waste was eventually converted into a landfill. As per March 2023, there is an estimated volume of 5.5 lakh tonnes of waste spread over 110 acres at the site. On 2 March 2023, a major fire burst out at Brahmapuram waste plant engulfing many parts of city in smoke containing toxic gas for many days.

== 2023 Brahmapuram waste plant fire ==
On 2 March 2023, a major fire broke out at the Brahmapuram waste plant. After the fire, major parts of Kochi city was engulfed in smoke. The fire broke out in a swampy area behind the Kinfra Industrial Park and the smoke spread for kilometers across the city. Following the outbreak, the Kerala State Pollution Control Board slapped a fine of Rs 1.80 crore on Kochi corporation. On 6 March, the toxic elements in the atmosphere of Kochi rapidly increased to a dangerous level following the outburst of fire. Many residents and opposition parties alleged that the fire was man made and a private agency engaged for mining the waste in the landfill played a major role in creating it.

Within a week after the outburst of fire, the smoke spread across to nearby districts of Alappuzha and Kottayam. The High Court of Kerala remarked that the people of Kochi were trapped in a gas chamber. The court also criticized the Kochi Corporation and the Pollution Control Board. The garbage in Kochi city piled up in the city after the garbage removal to Brahmapuram got stopped due to fire. After 12 days of continuous operations, the fire was extinguished completely on 13 March.
