= Arikomban =

Indian elephant

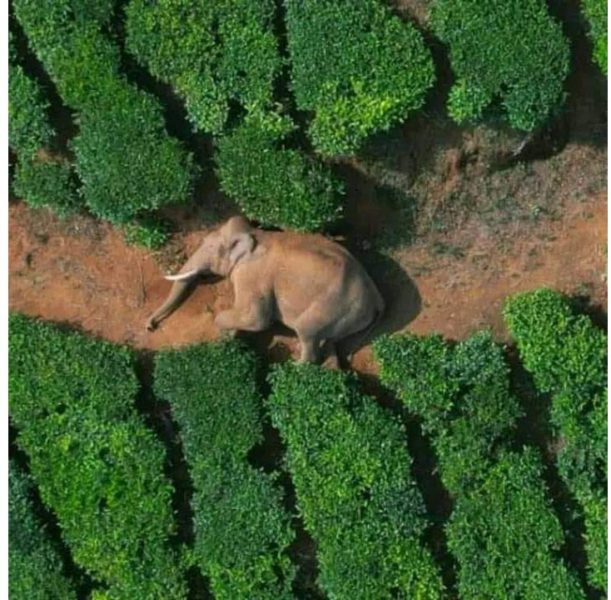
- Arikomban found sleeping in a tea estate at Chinnakanal
- Species: Elephas maximus (Asian elephant)
- Sex: Male
- Born: 1986/1987; Kerala, India
- Nationality: India
- Known for: Ransacking stores of rice

Arikomban (born c. 1986/1987) is a wild male Indian elephant from Kerala, India. The elephant is known for his raids on local shops for rice and causing damage in Chinnakanal area of Munnar and is rumoured to have killed ten people and injured many. It is considered one of the most notorious elephants in the world. The name Arikomban is a combination of the Malayalam words ari, meaning rice, and komban, meaning tusker.

Arikomban is estimated to be born in the late 1980s. He was initially known as Chinnakomban. The elephant started violence in the region in the early 2010s. Arikomban's practice involves breaking into ration shops, home kitchens and grocery stores and eating rice. A native's ration shop in Panniyar Estate was vandalized nine times in a year by Arikomban. Since 2005, more than 75 buildings have been destroyed by the elephant. On 29 April 2023, the Kerala wildlife department tranquillised and captured Arikomban from Chinnakanal and released into the Periyar National Park.

== History ==
In 2017, Kerala Forest Department tried unsuccessfully to capture Arikomban. One of the most experienced "Kumkis" (trained elephant) handlers in India, Anamalai Kaleem, led the operation, tracked the elephant, and hit it with tranquilliser shots, but it escaped into the wilderness.

In March 2023 a proposal to capture Arikomban by the Kerala government was initially controversial. Animal rights activists opposed the Kerala Forest Department's decision to capture and tame Kumuki elephants at the Kodanad Elephant Center in Ernakulam district. They petitioned the Kerala High Court, which prevented the department from going ahead. The court appointed an expert committee to investigate the matter, which recommended moving the elephant to the Parambikulam Tiger Reserve, a wilderness region with no possibility of human–elephant conflict. Protests quickly broke out in the Parambikulam neighbourhood as locals vehemently opposed the decision. The Kerala government was then instructed by the High Court to release Arikomban in a location chosen by the government while concealing the location. The court then instructed the forest department to follow the elephant, tranquillize it, and then fasten a radio collar around its neck to monitor its activities.

The government sought alternative areas to relocate the elephant. Arun Zachariah, a wildlife veterinarian, was in charge of the mission to capture Arikomban, assisted by 150 people from the police, health, and motor vehicles departments as well as the rescue services. In a two-day operation, the elephant was successfully tranquillized and herded into a truck using four kumki elephants and sent to the Periyar Tiger Reserve on 29 April 2023. After Government of Kerala's Relocation efforts failed the Tusker entered inside Cumbum forest range and it was wandering in villages around Cumbum, then the matter went into the hands of Tamil nadu forest department, two locations were selected to relocate Arikomban such as Srivilliputtur and Kalakkad. Due to protests in Srivilliputtur Arikomban was finally relocated into dense forest spread of Kalakkad forest range near Upper Kodayar dam.

In February 2024, it was reported that Arikomban was settling down well and was being tracked with a radio collar.

== In popular culture ==
A Malayalam feature film depicting the life of Arikomban is under development.

A short story, "Kari: A Prologue to "Arikomban," the Elephant," was published in Indian Literature.

== See also ==
- List of individual elephants
- Elephants in Kerala culture
- Padayappa
