= V.K. Narayana Bhattathiri =

Indian writer

Varavoor Kaplingat Narayana Bhattathiri
- Born: 1 August 1880
- Died: 20 November 1954
- Citizenship: Indian
- Spouse: Lakshmikuttyamma
- Writing career
- Pen name: VKN Bhattathiri
- Subjects: Vedic studies

Varavoor Kaplingat Narayana Bhattathiri (1880–1954) was a renowned Vedic scholar, a Sanskrit teacher, a prolific writer, a visionary and a social activist.

== Works ==
V.K.Narayana Bhattathiri wrote more than 500 articles in various newspapers and magazines, in a span of about four decades, beginning from 1915.

Major books written by V.K.Narayana Bhattathiri are:

- Vedham Dharmmamulam
- Vedha-sandesham
- Vedhaardhavicharam
