= Murder of Chandini =

Murder case in India

Killing of Chandini
- Date: 28 July 2023
- Venue: Aluva market
- Location: Aluva, Kerala, India
- Cause: Sexual assault and strangled to death
- First reporter: Unnamed person
- Outcome: Death of Chandini
- Deaths: 1
- Arrests: 1
- Accused: Ashfaq Aslam
- Convicted: 4 November 2023
- Charges: 13 including murder and POCSO
- Verdict: 14 November 2023
- Sentence: Capital punishment

Chandini, aged five, was sexually assaulted and murdered by Ashfaq Aslam on 28 July 2023. She was kidnapped from the Aluva market in Kerala, and her body was found on the banks of the Periyar River. In November 2023, Aslam was convicted of rape and murder and was sentenced to death.

== Background ==
Chandini was a five-year-old student who migrated from the state of Bihar to the state of Kerala in India. She lived with her parents in a rented flat in Choornikkara, Aluva, and was a class one student at the Thaikkattukara UP school.

Ashfaq Aslam had moved in to live in the floor above Chandini's home two days earlier.

== Kidnapping and killing ==
On 28 July 2023, Chandini was abducted by Ashfaq Aslam, a native of Assam. They were in the Aluva market around 3:30 pm and he walked behind her. Seeing him and the girl, some people were suspicious, but Aslam replied that it was his child. He then allegedly came to a secluded place behind the market, sexually assaulted Chandini, and killed her around 5:30 pm. The inquest revealed that there was a wound on her genitals. He had strangled her with her own clothes, and hit her face with a stone. After confirming her death, he put plastic covers and sacks over her body.

== Investigation ==
After CCTV footage showed Chandini accompanying Aslam to the neighbouring bus stop, the police detained him He was in an intoxicated state, the police claimed, making it impossible to get information out of him. In the morning, Aluva market employees told the police that they had seen a man with a child there the night before. Aslam initially told the police that he had given the child to a man named Zakir, after becoming sober the next morning.

However, later he admitted to the crime. The body was then discovered on the banks of the Periyar River in the market area about noon, where trash is deposited behind the market. Later, Chandini's body was identified by her father. In this case. 41 witnesses in all were questioned. Ashfaq was tested with an interpreter present. Within 30 days, the police completed their investigation and submitted the chargesheet to the court.

== Trial and verdict ==
The trial, which started on October 4, was completed in 26 days. Sixteen charges were brought against him, including murder, kidnapping, rape, and unnatural sex. On 4 November 2023, Alam was found guilty of sixteen counts under the Juvenile Justice (Care and Protection of Children) Act, the Protection of Children from Sexual Offenses (POCSO) Act, and the Indian Penal Code. He was sentenced to death.

== See also ==
- 2001 Aluva massacre
