= Kerala Fiber Optic Network =

Special-purpose company of the government of Kerala, India

Kerala Fiber Optic Network (K-FON)
- കേരള ഫൈബർ ഒപ്റ്റിക് നെറ്റ്‌വർക്ക് (കെ-ഫോൺ)
- Type of project: Public
- Owner: Government of Kerala
- Country: India
- State: Kerala
- Chief Minister: Pinarayi Vijayan
- Launched: June 5, 2023; 3 years ago
- Status: Active
- Website: K-FON

Kerala Fibre Optic Network (K-FON) is a public-funded initiative by the Kerala government that aims to provide high-speed Internet connectivity to the whole Indian state of Kerala. It is the project of the first Pinarayi Vijayan government and was launched in February 2021 to ensure universal Internet connectivity, addressing the issue of the digital divide, and connecting 2 million below-poverty-line (BPL) families in Kerala. KFON got the Internet Service Provider from the Department of Telecommunications in 2022, making Kerala the first Indian state to have its own Internet service. In the first phase, K-Fon's internet service will be available in 14,000 economically backward houses and over 30,000 government institutions. The project was inaugurated on 5 June 2023 by the Chief Minister Pinarai Vijayan.

== Overview ==
The Kerala State Electricity Board (KSEB), Kerala Infrastructure Investment Fund Board (KIIFB), Bharat Electronics Limited, and KSITI are the stakeholders in the K-FON project. All locations with KSEB electricity posts are intended to receive fast internet, landlines, and cable TV through the K-FON project. More than 2 million BPL families in the state are expected to get free internet access, according to the project.

The cable are installed through KSEB's transmission line infrastructure. This technique, to a certain extent, prevents digging the road. Through KSEB's distribution network, the government hopes to reach more than 4 million end consumers in their homes and workplaces. This distribution will be handled by regional organisations. With optical fibre cables running through the KSEB network, all state government offices will be switched over to the e-Government platform.

Initially, the government promised to provide free internet access to 2 million households in 18 months. Later, the number was revised to 14,000 households in the first phase.

According to KSEB, the total cost of the project is ₹1,516.76 crore (US$160 million). KIIFB received a loan of ₹1,061 crore (US$110 million) from the central government institution.
