= Chinnakanal =

- Village
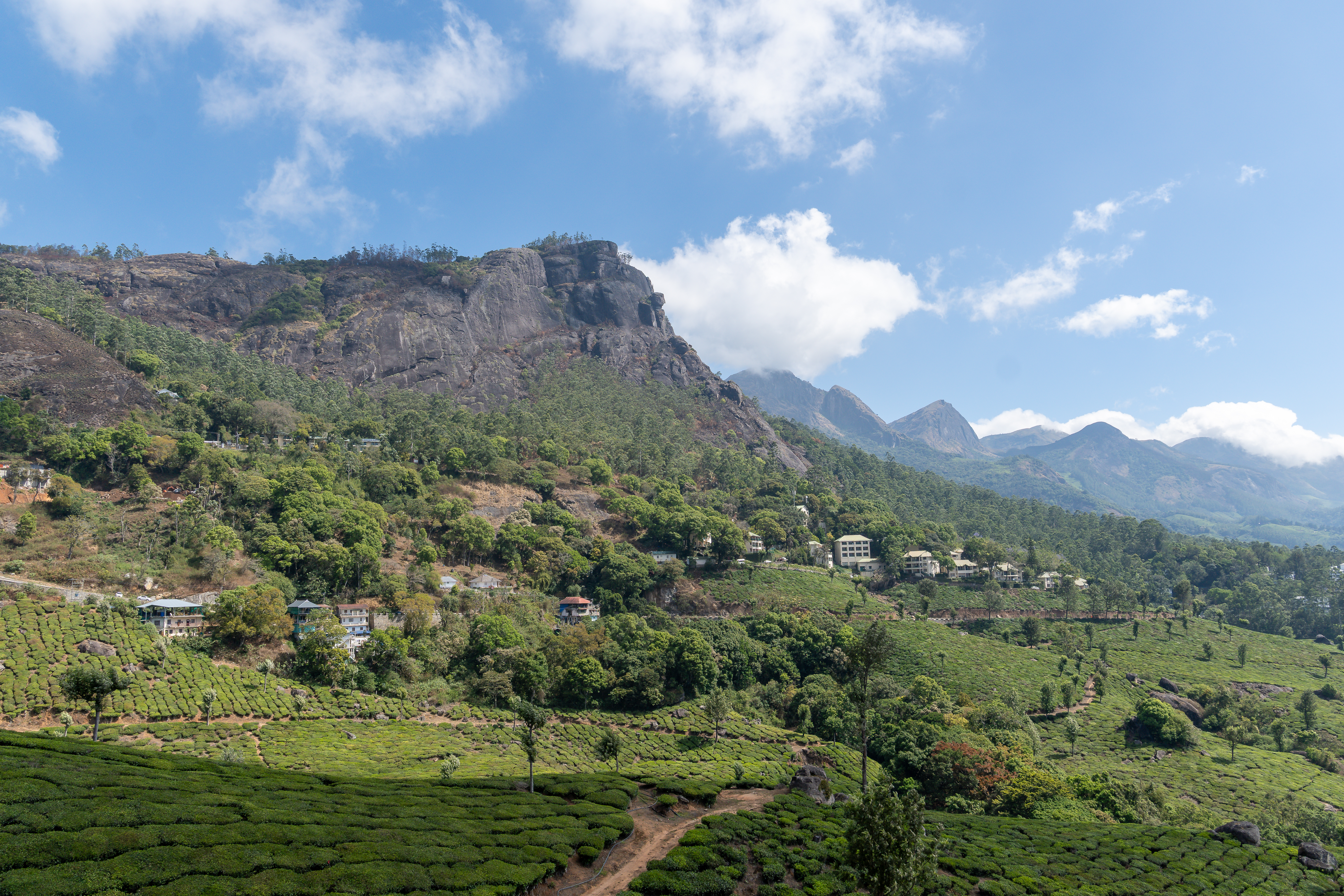

- Location in Kerala, India Chinnakanal (India)
- Coordinates: 10.04117°N 77.170860°E
- Country: India
- State: Kerala
- District: Idukki

Area
  - Total: 67.33 km^{2} (26.00 sq mi)

Population (2011)
  - Total: 12,005
  - Density: 178.3/km^{2} (461.8/sq mi)

Languages
  - Official: Malayalam, English
  - Regional: Malayalam, Tamil
- Time zone: UTC+5:30 (IST)

Chinnakanal is a village in Idukki district in the Indian state of Kerala. It has waterfalls which are popularly known as the Power House Waterfalls. Arikomban is a famous elephant that lived in Chinnakanal.

== Demographics ==
As of the 2011 Census, Chinnakanal had a population of 12,005 with 6,098 males and 5,907 females. Chinnakanal village spreads over an area of 67.33 km^{2} (26.00 sq mi) with 3,210 families residing in it and 9.6% of the population being under 6 years of age. Chinnakanal had an average literacy of 78.6%, 4.6% higher than the national average of 74% and 15.4% lower than state average of 94%; male literacy was 86.2% and female literacy was 70.8%.

== Gallery ==
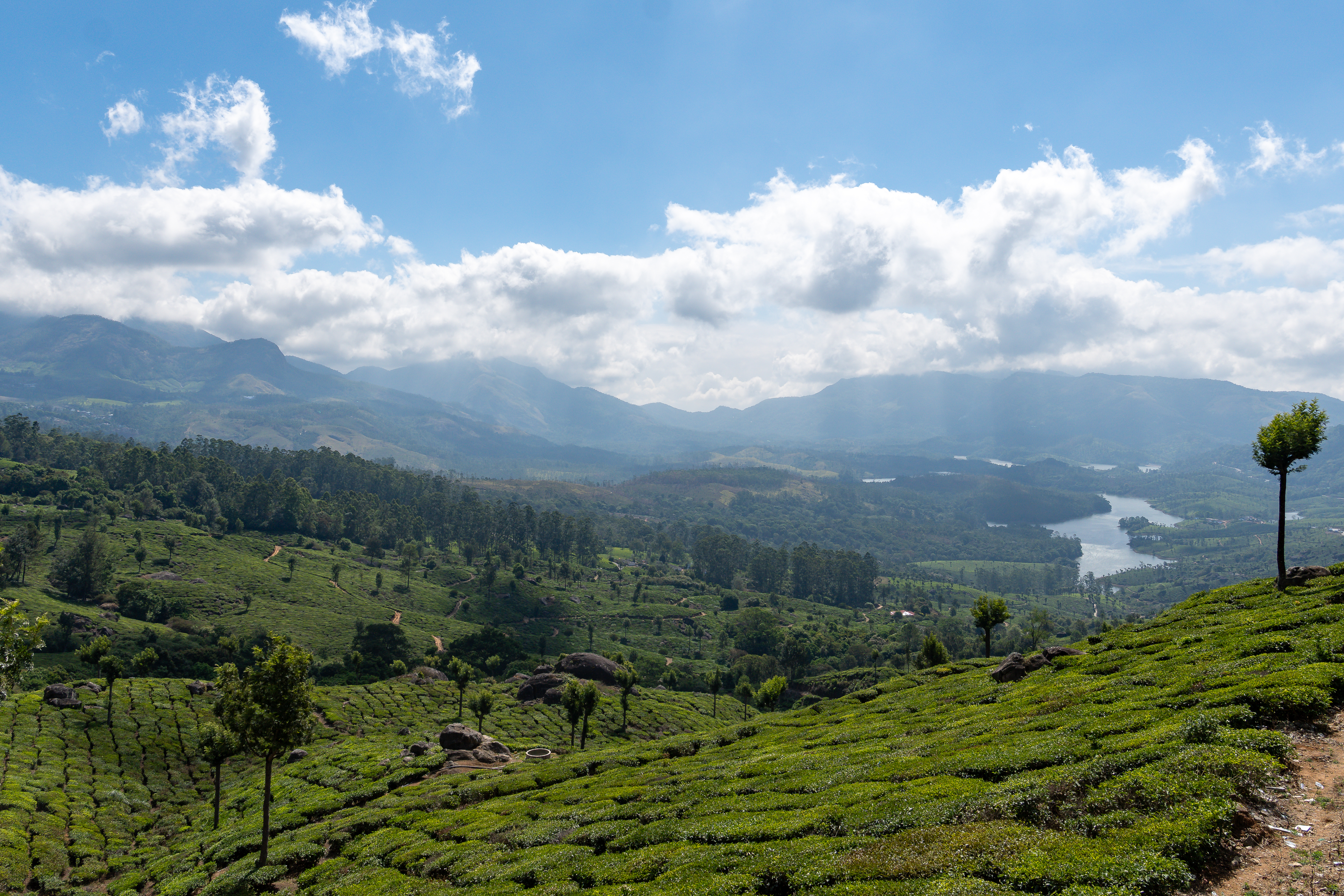
View from Chinnakanal

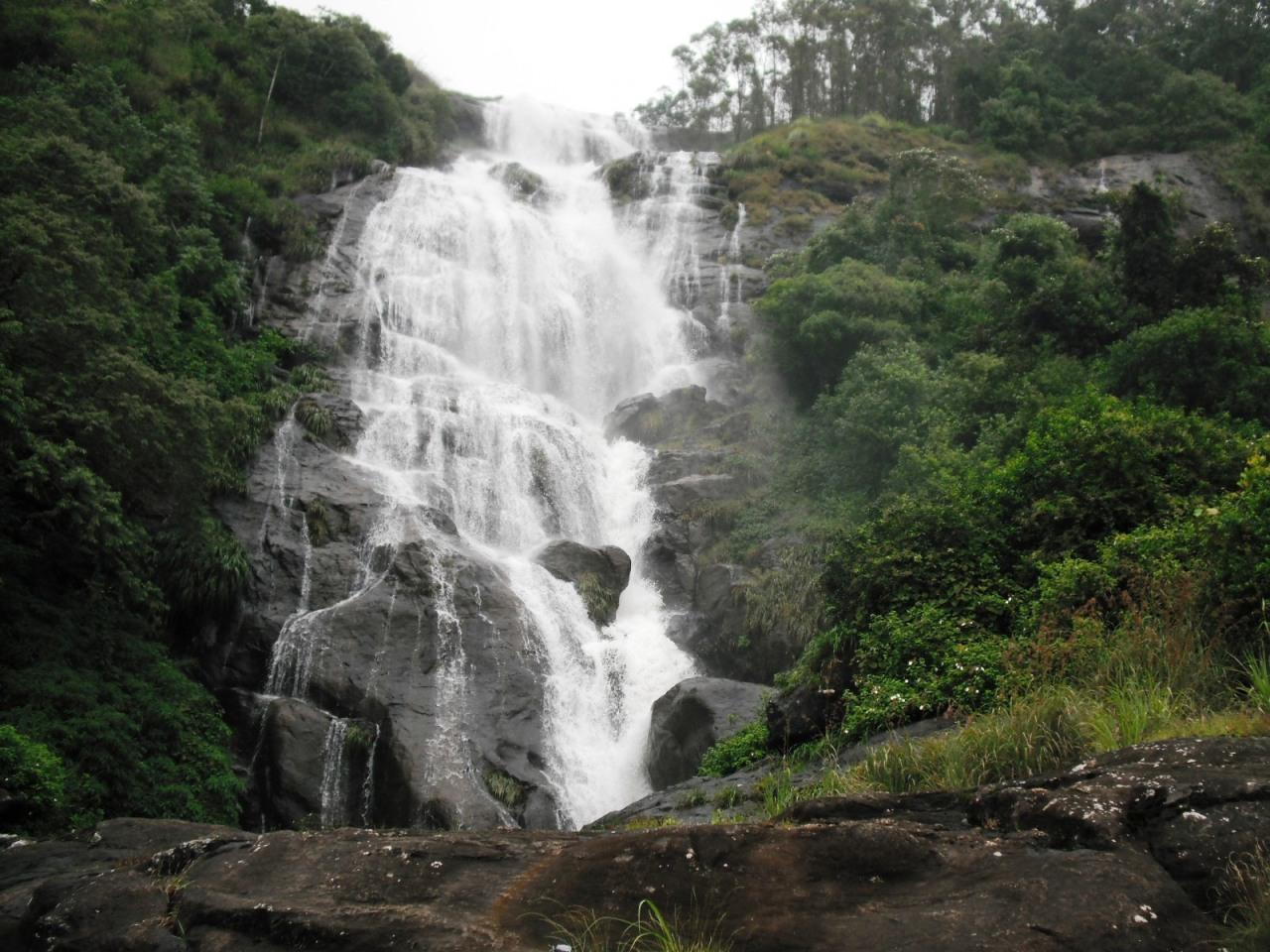
Chinnakanal Waterfalls

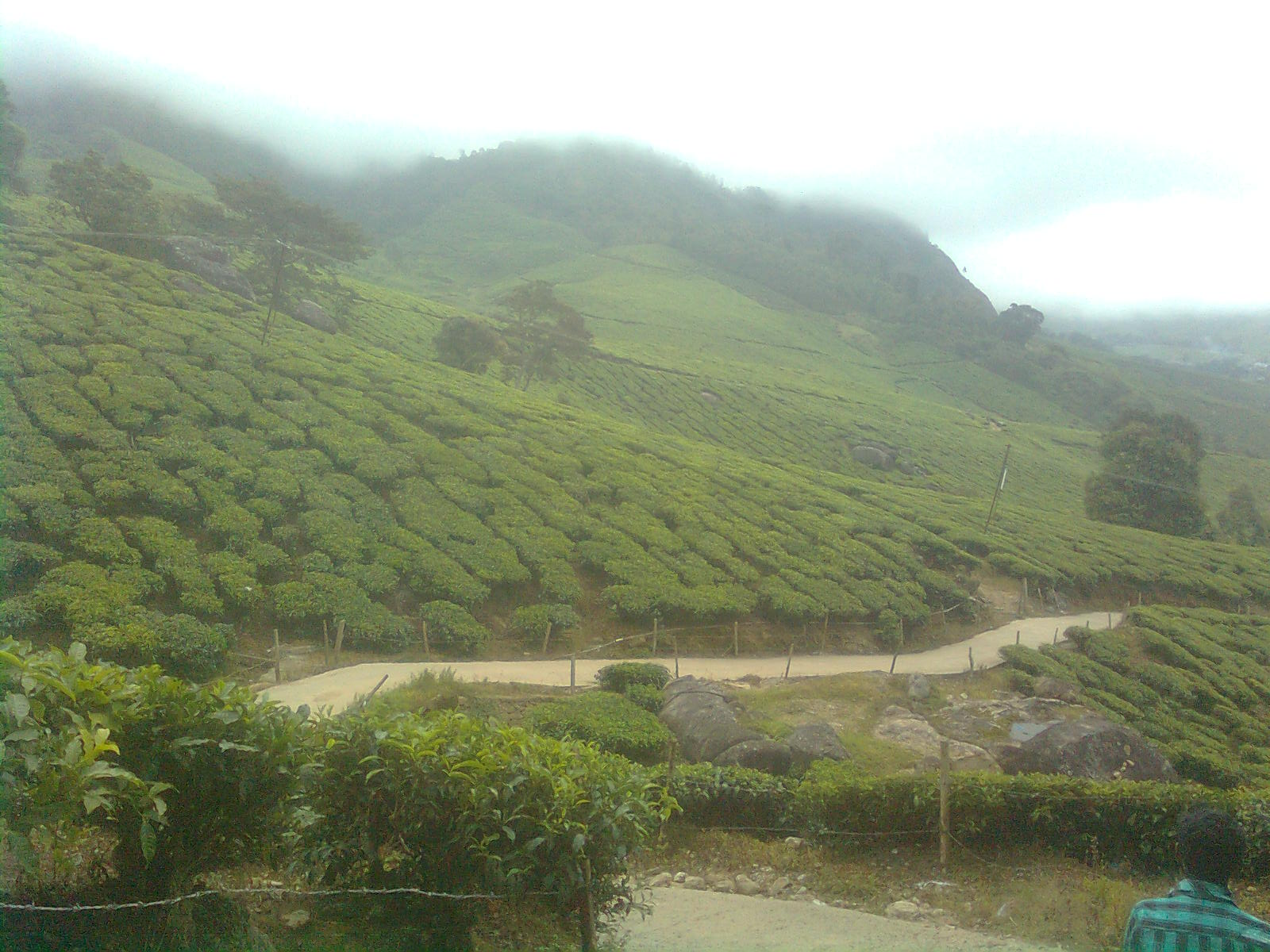
Suryanelli Tea estate

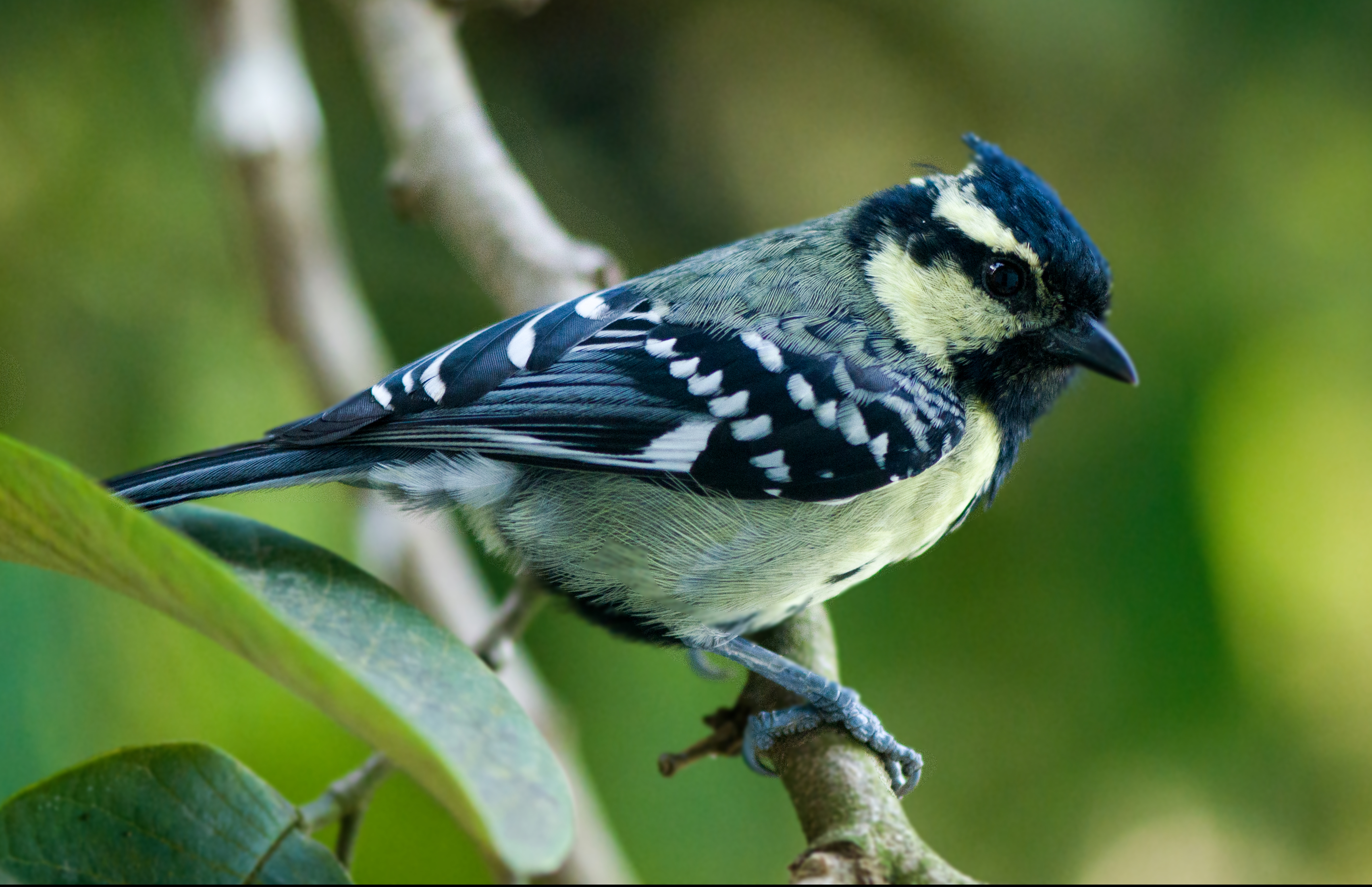
Indian black-lored tit spotted in Chinnakanal

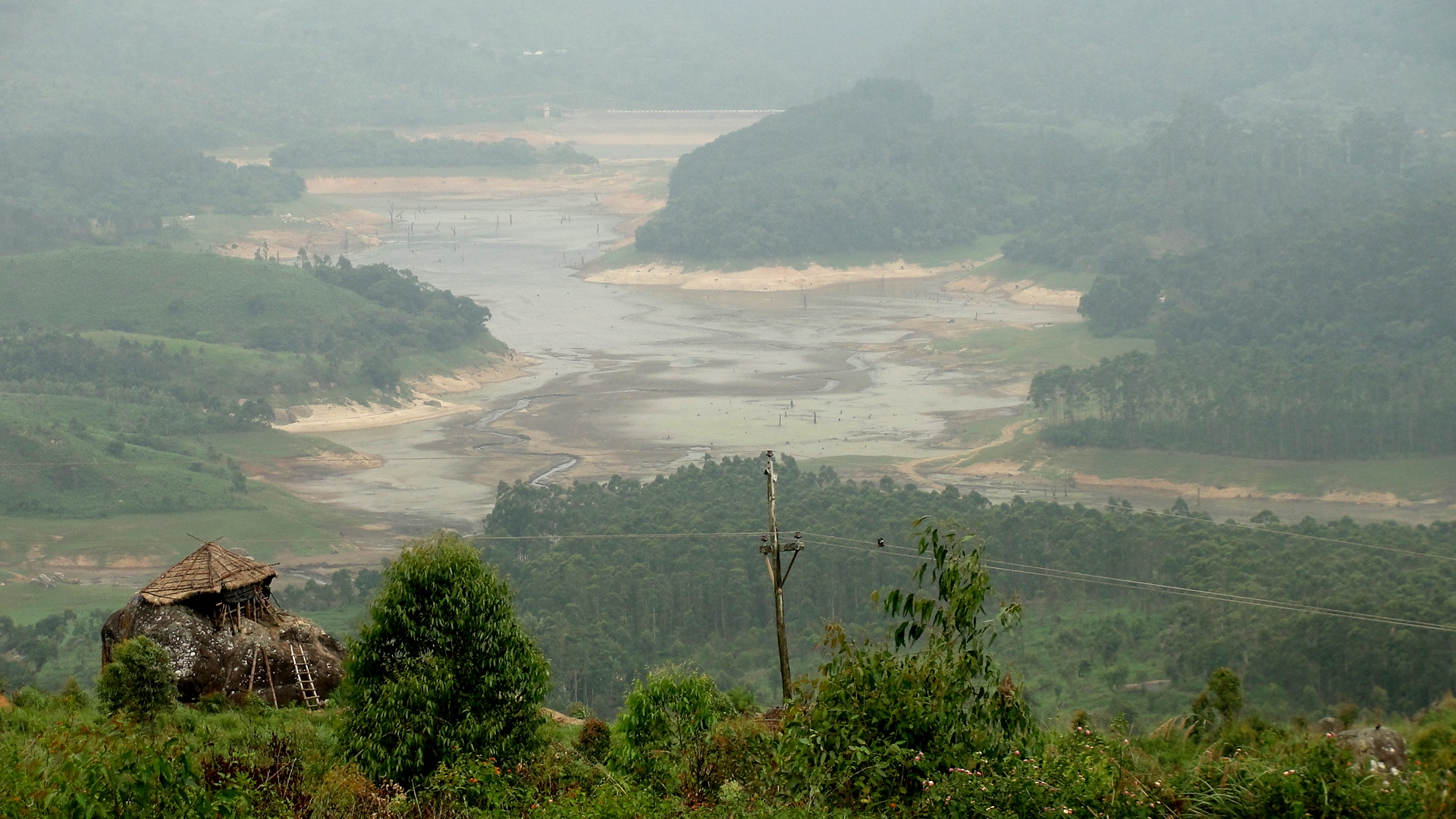
A waterbody view
