= Kerala Prisons and Correctional Services =

Prisons Department for Kerala, India

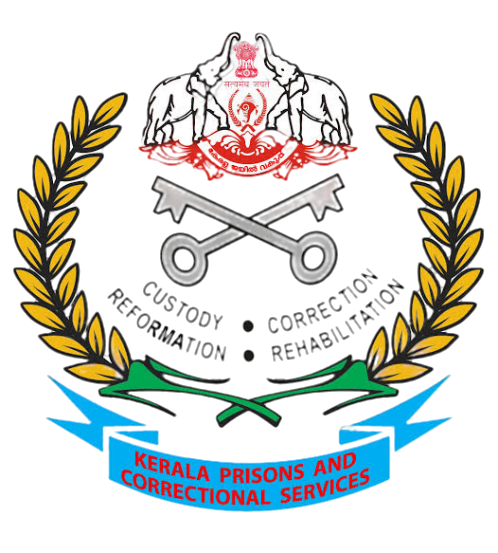
- Abbreviation: KPCS, KJS
- Motto: Custody ★ Correction ★ Reformation ★ Rehabilitation

Agency overview
- Formed: 1 November 1956
- Preceding agencies: Travancore - Cochin State Jail Department; British Malabar State Jail Department
- Annual budget: ₹277.82 crore (US$30 million) (2026–27, revised)

Jurisdictional structure
- Operations jurisdiction: Kerala, India
- Legal jurisdiction: As per operations jurisdiction
- Governing body: Home Department, Government of Kerala

Operational structure
- Headquarters: Poojappura, Thiruvananthapuram; Kerala-695012
- Minister responsible: Ramesh Chennithala, Minister for Home, Vigilance and Prisons
- Agency executive: S. Sreejith IPS, Director General of Prisons and Correctional Services
- Parent agency: Home Department, Government of Kerala

Facilities
Prisons and Correctional Institutions
Prisons (as of 2025)
- Central Prisons: 4
- Open Prisons and Correctional Homes: 3
- High Security Prisons: 1
- District Jails: 13
- Special Sub Jails: 16
- Sub Jails: 16
- Women’s Prisons: 3
- Borstal School: 1

Website
- https://keralaprisons.gov.in/

The Kerala Prisons and Correctional Services is a state agency of Kerala that operates prisons and borstal schools. It has its headquarters in Thiruvananthapuram. The Kerala Prisons and Correctional Services is headed by the Director General of Prisons.

== History ==
The history of Kerala Prisons and Correctional Services dates back to the formation of the state in 1956. Prior to that, jails existed in the Travancore-Cochin State and British Malabar State, which were later reorganized to form the Jail department.

In Travancore, the first administration report of the Jails was published in 1862 and 1863. It mentioned the existence of the Principal Jail at Trivandrum (Fort), along with Divisional Jails at Quilon and Alleppey. Additionally, Sub Jails were attached to the District or Zilla Courts. The Principal Jail at Fort, initially housed in the old barracks of Nair Brigade, was upgraded to the status of Central Jail in 1873. It was later relocated to its present site at Poojappura in 1886. Industrial activities were introduced in the Central Prison in the same year. Various reforms were implemented to improve the condition of convicts, including the construction of a separate block for female prisoners in 1904.

In Cochin, improved jails were established alongside the establishment of Zilla Courts. There were two jails, one in Ernakulam and the other in Trichur, along with a small jail in Tripunithura that was part of the Ernakulam Jail. In 1890, a Central Jail was established in Ernakulam, and efforts were made to enhance jail administration by appointing Mr. Robinson, a European Police Officer, as Superintendent in 1892. The jail was later shifted to Viyyur in 1914. Alongside the Central Jail at Viyyur, there were seven Sub Jails in Cochin where under trial prisoners and those with short-term sentences were detained.

In the Malabar region, under the Madras province, there existed Central Prison Kannur, Special Sub Jail Kozhikode, and 20 ordinary Sub Jails at the time of Kerala's state reorganization. The Special Sub Jail in Kozhikode, established in 1861, is the oldest jail in Kerala. Central Prison Kannur, the second oldest jail and the first Central Jail in the state, was established in 1869.

With the formation of the Kerala state, various jails and establishments came under the purview of the Jail Department. These included Central Prisons in Kannur, Viyyur, and Thiruvananthapuram, as well as a Special Sub Jail in Kozhikode, several A-class and B-class Sub Jails, and a Borstal School attached to Central Prison Kannur. Over the years, new facilities were established, such as the first Open Jail at Nettukalthery in 1962, the first Women's Prison at Neyyattinkara in 1990, and additional Open Jails and Women's Prisons in different locations.

The Jail Training School, established in 1957 and later renamed the State Institute of Correctional Administration, provided training to jail staff. It also expanded with the establishment of extension centers in Thrissur and Kannur in 2010. Alongside the administration of jails, the Prison Department implemented social welfare programs until 1975 when these responsibilities were transferred to the newly formed Social Welfare Department.

The post of Inspector General (IG) of Prisons was created in 1953, and subsequent regional setups were established in Kozhikode and Thrissur in 1981. The Kerala Prisons Rules, formulated under the Indian Prisons Act 1894 and the Travancore-Cochin Prisons Act 1950, were later repealed by the Kerala Prisons and Correctional Services (Management) Rules 2014.

== Organization ==
The Kerala Prisons and Correctional Services is headed by the Director General, Prisons and Correctional Services who is of the rank of Director General of Police or Additional Director General of Police. Prisons Headquarters is situated at Poojappura, Thiruvananthapuram. The Director General of Prisons (DG) is assisted by Deputy Inspectors General of Prisons at headquarters and by Deputy Inspector General of Prisons of South, Central and North Zones. The head of the department is commonly an Indian Police Service (IPS) Officer by deputation. The present Director General of Prisons is Balram Kumar Upadhyay IPS.

The State Institute of Correctional Administration (SICA) at Thiruvananthapuram is the primary training centre for the Kerala Prisons & Correctional Services Department and is headed by the Deputy Inspector General of Prisons (South Zone).

Organizational Structure of Kerala Prisons Department
| Zone | Jurisdiction (Districts) | Head of Zone |
|---|---|---|
| South Zone (HQ: Poojappura, Thiruvananthapuram) | Thiruvananthapuram, Kollam, Pathanamthitta, Alappuzha | DIG of Prisons & SICA |
| Central Zone (HQ: Viyyoor, Thrissur) | Kottayam, Idukki, Ernakulam, Thrissur | DIG of Prisons |
| North Zone (HQ: Kozhikode) | Palakkad, Malappuram, Kozhikode, Wayanad, Kannur, Kasaragod | DIG of Prisons |

=== Hierarchy ===
- Director General, Prisons & Correctional Services (IPS Cadre)
- Deputy Inspector General of Prisons
- Superintendent, Central Prison & Correctional Home/Open Prison & Correctional Home/ High Security Prison
- Joint Superintendent/Senior Lecturer, SICA/Superintendent of District Jail/Superintendent of Women Prison/ Superintendent, Women Open Prison
- Deputy Superintendent/ Superintendent, Special Sub Jail/ Superintendent, Borstal School
- Assistant Superintendent Grade-I / Superintendent, Sub Jail/ Armourer, SICA/ Training Officer, SICA/ Supervisor, Open Prison & Borstal School/ Store Keeper, Open Prison
- Assistant Superintendent Grade-II/ Prison Officer/ Gate Keeper
- Deputy Prison Officer / Chief Petty Officer
- Assistant Prison Officer/Petty officer
- Assistant Prison Officer Cum Driver

== Prisons and Correctional Institutions ==
Jails are typically smaller facilities located in district or sub-district headquarters, and they primarily house individuals who are awaiting trial or serving short-term sentences, usually less than two years. Prisons, on the other hand, are larger correctional institutions that house individuals convicted of serious offenses and serve longer-term sentences. Overall, while jails are primarily for temporary detention, prisons are designed for long-term incarceration and focus on both punishment and rehabilitation.

=== Sub jails ===
Sub-jails are specialized facilities intended for confining individuals who have been sentenced to undergo imprisonment for a period of up to one month, as well as for housing remand or under trial prisoners. They are typically located in district or sub-district headquarters and provide temporary detention for individuals awaiting trial or serving brief sentences.

Each Sub Jail is headed by a Jail Superintendent of the rank of Assistant Superintendent Grade I.

=== Special Sub Jails ===
Special Sub Jails are used to confine persons sentenced to imprisonment for up to three months, as well as remand and undertrial prisoners.

There are a total of 16 special sub jails in the state, and each headed by a Jail Superintendent of the rank of Deputy Superintendent.

=== Borstal schools ===
A Borstal School, located in Thrikkakkara, Ernakulam, serves as a residential facility specifically designed to accommodate individuals aged 18 to 21 who have been convicted of criminal offenses during their adolescent years. The Borstal School at Thrikkakara is headed by an officer of the rank of Deputy Superintendent.

=== District jails ===
District Jails are meant for confining persons sentenced to undergo imprisonment up to 6 months besides Remand / Under Trial prisoners. There are 13 District Jails in kerala.

Each district jail is headed by a Jail Superintendent of the rank of Joint Superintendent.

=== Women Prisons ===
Women Prison & Correctional Homes serve as facilities for incarcerating female offenders, regardless of their sentence length, as well as accommodating women prisoners awaiting trial or those under remand. These institutions are located in three distinct areas: Thiruvananthapuram, Viyyur, and Kannur.

Each women prison is headed by a Woman Jail Superintendent of the rank of Joint Superintendent.

=== Open Prisons ===
Open Prison and Correctional Homes, also known as minimum-security prisons, are specialized correctional institutions that do not have physical barriers such as walls. These facilities are designed to accommodate well-behaved convicted prisoners who demonstrate a strong sense of self-discipline and social responsibility. Within the state, there are three notable Open Prison and Correctional Homes. Two of these facilities cater to male prisoners and are located in Nettukaltheri, Thiruvananthapuram, and Cheemeni, Kasargod respectively. The third institution is exclusively dedicated to female prisoners and is situated in Poojappura, Thiruvananthapuram. These Open Prison and Correctional Homes aim to provide a rehabilitative environment for inmates who have demonstrated positive behavioral traits and a commitment to personal growth. By allowing a certain degree of freedom and independence, while still ensuring the maintenance of security measures, these institutions seek to foster the reintegration of prisoners into society upon their release.

Each open prison is headed by an officer from the cadre of Superintendent.

=== Central jails ===
Central Prisons and Correctional Homes serve as facilities for the confinement of individuals who have been sentenced to imprisonment for a period exceeding six months, detainees, prisoners convicted by Court Martial, and civil prisoners. Additionally, when nearby District Jails, Special Sub Jails, or Sub Jails experience overcrowding, remand or under trial prisoners may also be housed in these facilities. Presently, there are four Central Prisons and Correctional Homes located in Thiruvananthapuram, Thrissur, Kannur, and Malappuram.

Each of these Central Jails are headed by an officer from the cadre of Superintendent.

=== Central Prison & Correctional Homes ===
Central Prisons & Correctional Centers are meant for confining persons sentenced to undergo imprisonment above 6 months, prisoners convicted by Court Martial, detenues and civil prisoners. There are four Central Prison & Correctional Homes, situated at Thiruvananthapuram, Thrissur, Malappuram and Kannur.

- Central Prison & Correctional Home, Poojappura, Thiruvananthapuram
- Central Prison & Correctional Home, Viyyur, Thrissur
- Central Prison & Correctional Home, Kannur, Pallikkunnu, Kannur
- Central Prison & Correctional Home, Tavanur, Malappuram

=== Other Prisons ===
- Open Prisons = 3
- High Security Prisons = 1
- Women Prisons = 3
- District Jails = 13
- Special Sub Jails = 15
- Borstal schools = 1
- Sub Jails = 16

== District wise jails ==
| District | Jail / Correctional Institutions |
|---|---|
| Thiruvananthapuram | Central Prison and Correctional Services, Thiruvananthapuram; Open Prison and Correctional Home, Thiruvananthapuram; District Jail, Thiruvananthapuram; Women Prison and Correctional Home, Thiruvananthapuram; Women Open Prison and Correctional Home, Thiruvananthapuram; Special Sub Jail, Thiruvananthapuram; Special Sub Jail, Neyyattinkara; Sub Jail, Attingal |
| Kollam | District Jail, Kollam; Special Sub Jail, Kottarakkara |
| Pathanamthitta | District Jail, Pathanamthitta |
| Alappuzha | District Jail, Alappuzha; Special Sub Jail, Mavelikkara; Sub Jail, Alappuzha |
| Kottayam | District Jail, Kottayam; Special Sub Jail, Ponkunnam; Sub Jail, Pala |
| Idukki | District Jail, Idukki; Special Sub Jail, Devikulam; Sub Jail, Peerumedu |
| Ernakulam | District Jail, Ernakulam; Special Sub Jail, Muvattupuzha; Borstal School, Thrikkakara; Sub Jails, Ernakulam, Aluva and Mattancherry |
| Thrissur | Central Prison and Correctional Home, Viyyur; High Security Prison, Viyyur; District Jail, Thrissur; Women Prison and Correctional Home, Viyyur; Special Sub Jail, Irinjalakuda; Sub Jails, Viyyur and Chavakkad |
| Palakkad | District Jail, Malampuzha; Special Sub Jail, Chittur; Sub Jails, Alathur and Ottappalam |
| Malappuram | Central Prison and Correctional Home, Tavanur; Special Sub Jail, Manjeri; Sub Jails, Tirur, Ponnani and Perinthalmanna |
| Kozhikode | District Jail, Kozhikode; Special Sub Jail, Kozhikode; Sub Jails, Koyilandy and Vadakara |
| Wayanad | District Jail, Mananthavady; Special Sub Jail, Vythiri |
| Kannur | Central Prison and Correctional Home, Kannur; District Jail, Kannur; Women Prison and Correctional Home, Kannur; Special Sub Jails, Kannur, Thalassery and Koothuparamba; Sub Jail, Kannur |
| Kasaragod | Open Prison and Correctional Home, Cheemeni; District Jail, Hosdurg; Special Sub Jail, Kasaragod |

== Ranks and Insignia ==
Kerala Prisons and Correctional Services Officers Insignia
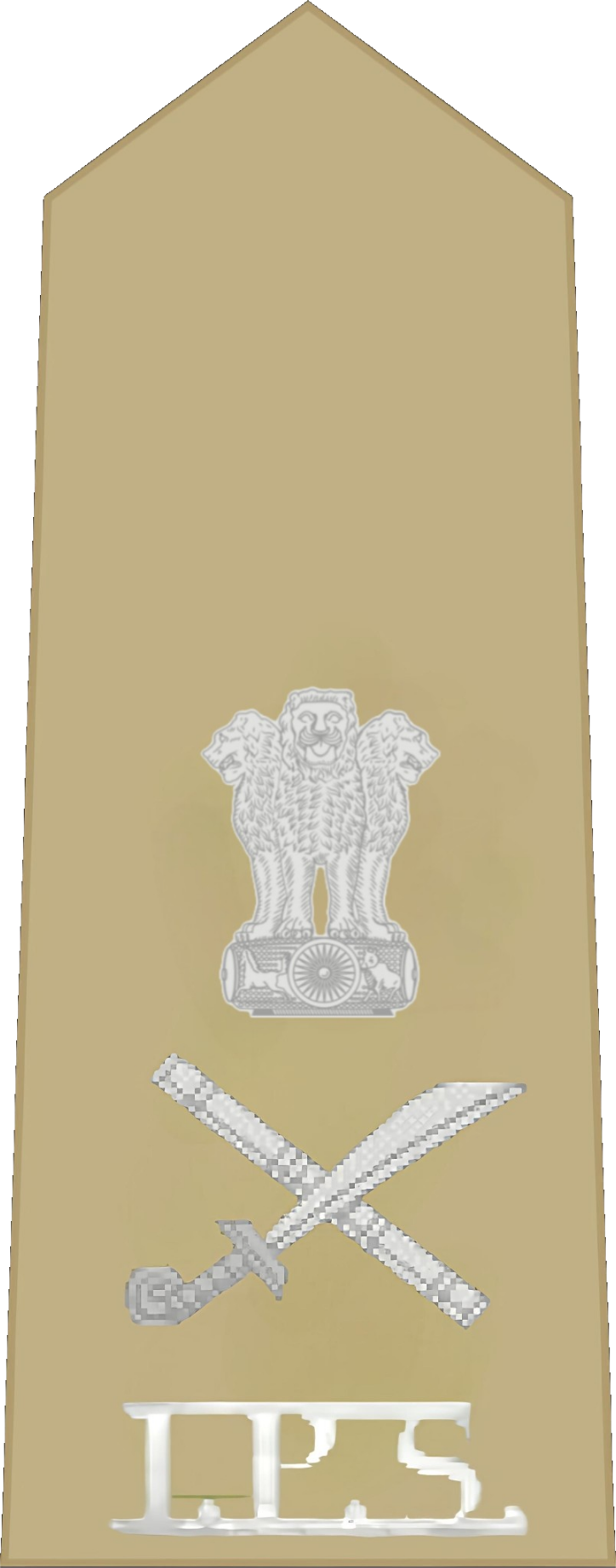
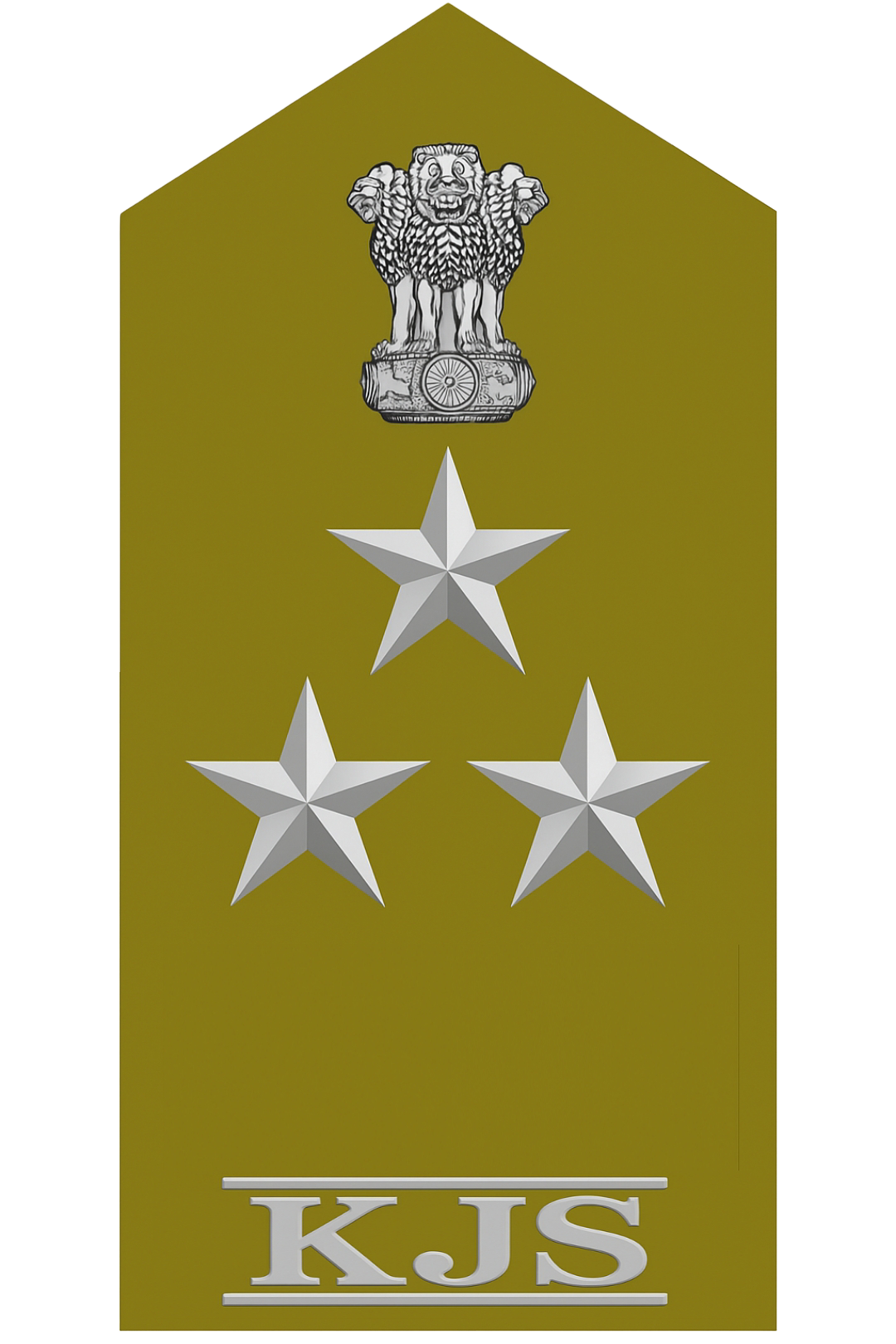
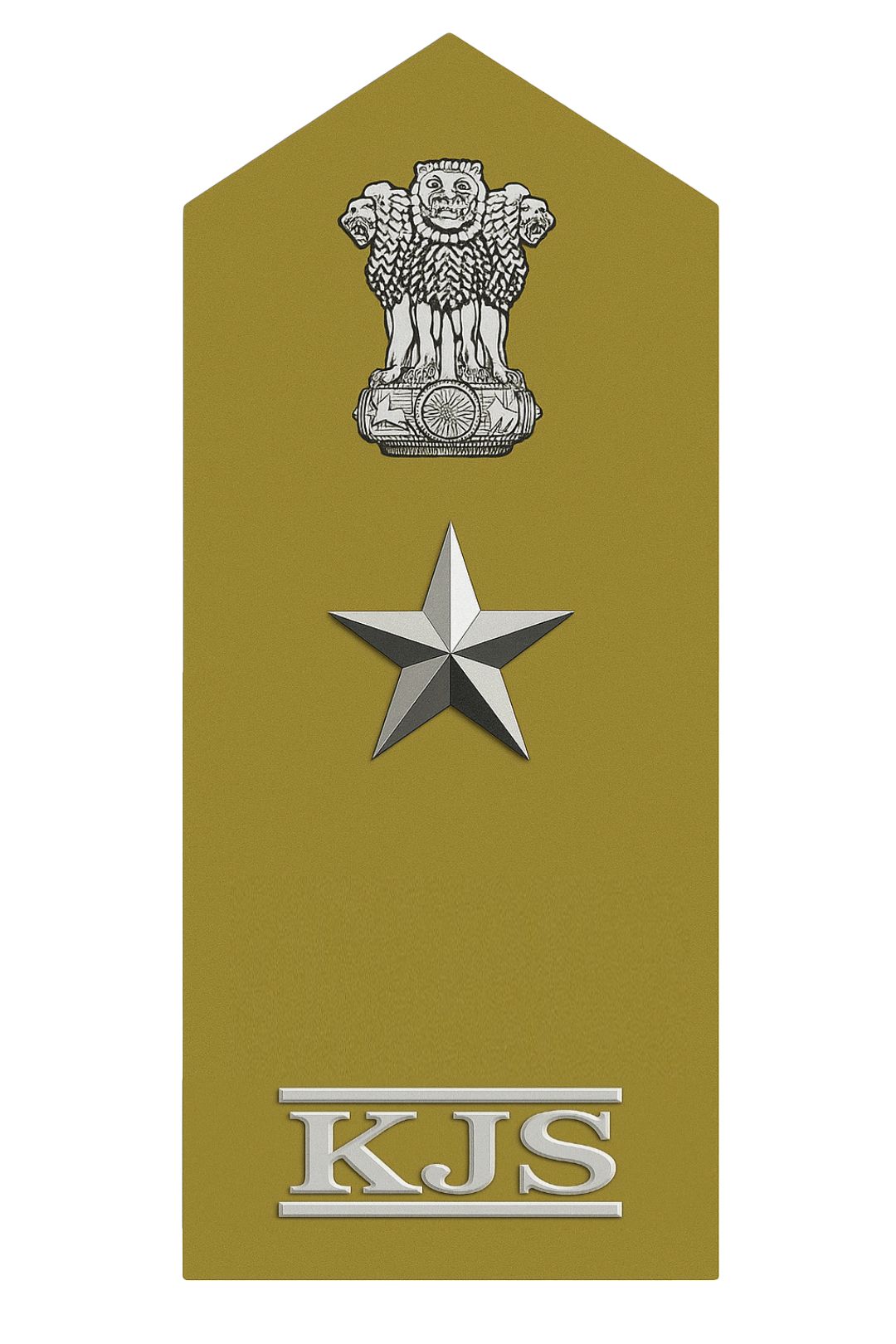
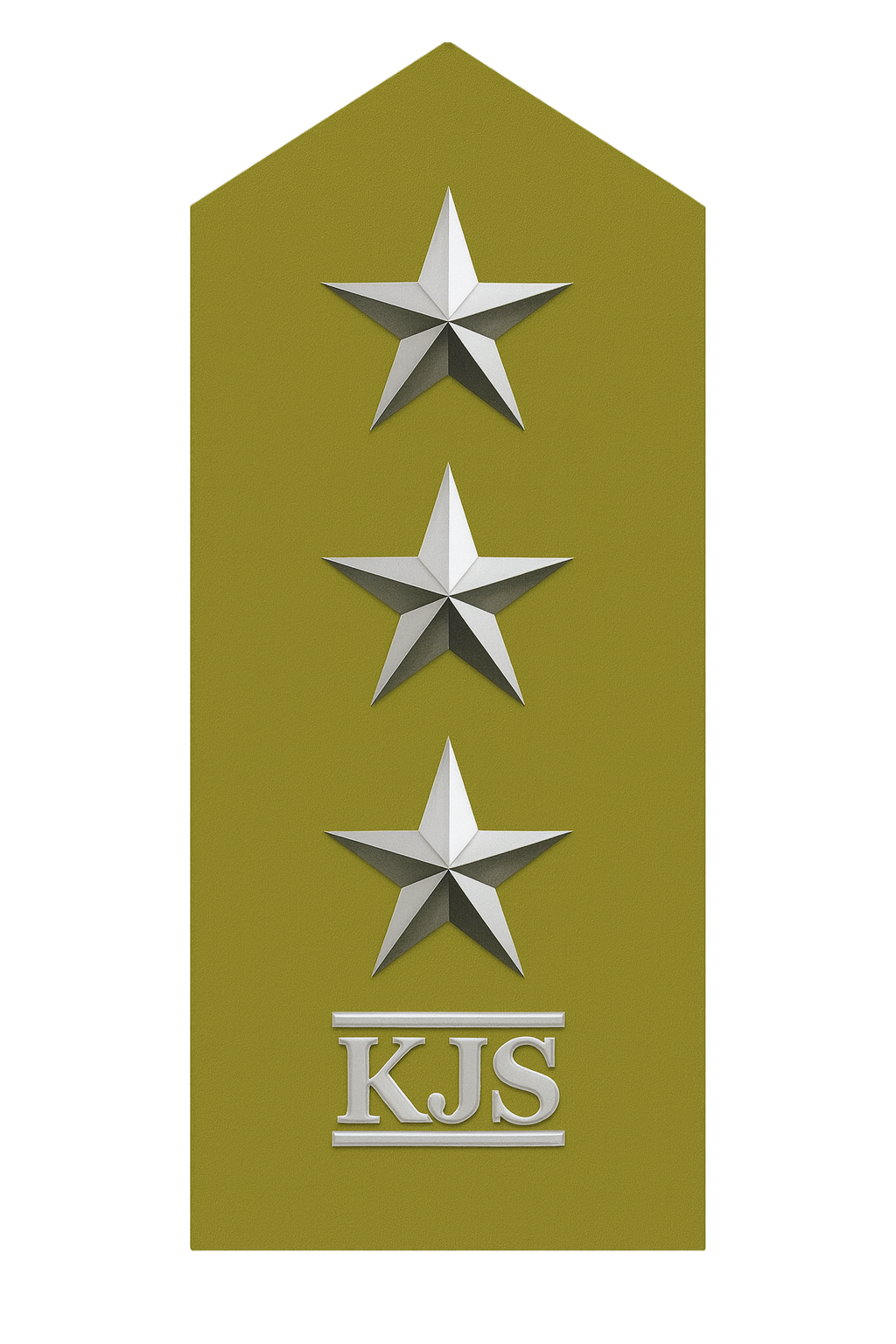
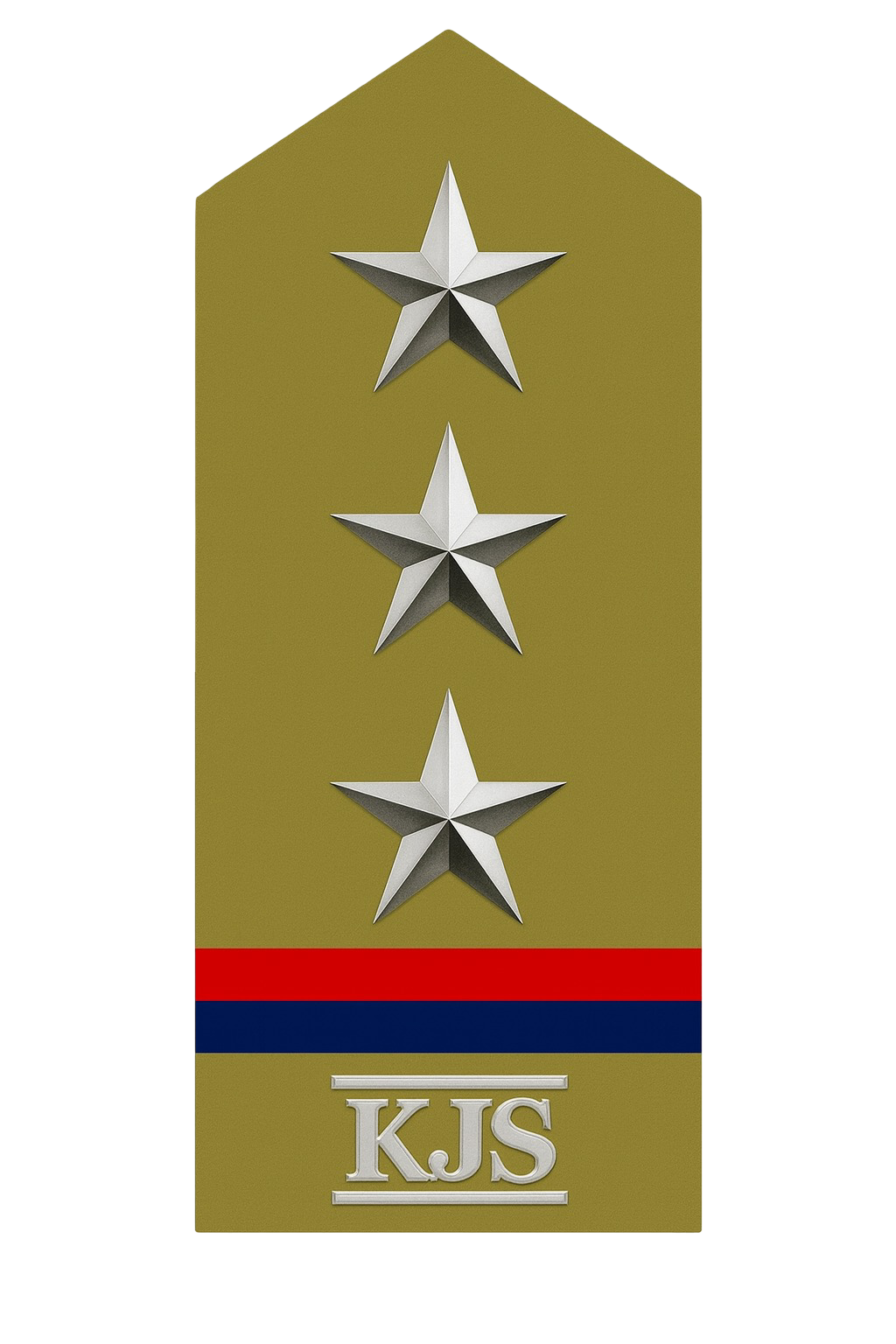
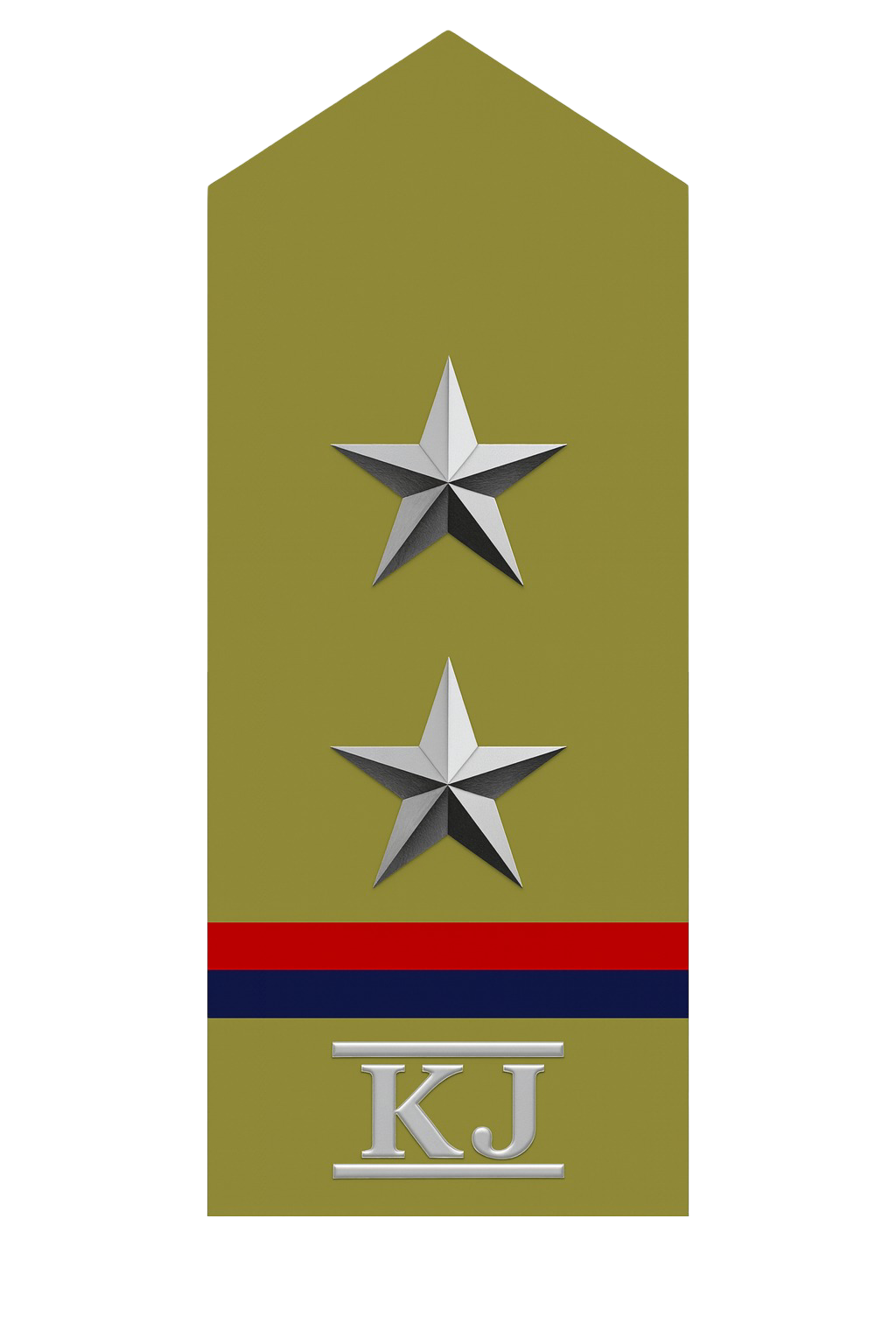
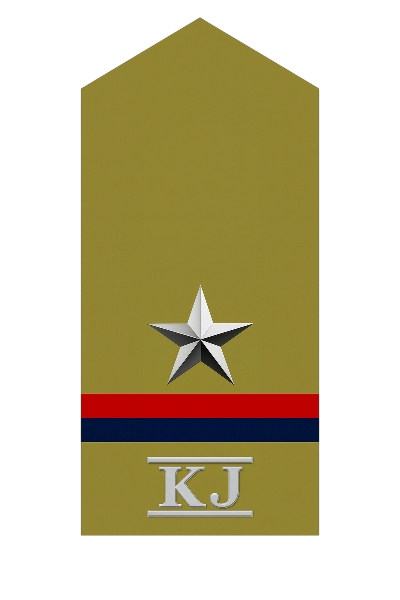
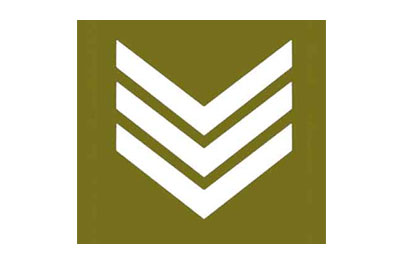
Gazetted Officers
| Insignia |
| Rank | Director General (IPS Cadre) | Deputy Inspector General of Prisons | Superintendent of Prisons | Joint Superintendent | Deputy Superintendent |
| Abbreviation | DG | DIG | Supt. | Jt. Supt. | Dy Supt. |
Non-Gazetted Officers
| Insignia | | | | No insignia |
| Rank | Assistant Superintendent (Grade I) | Assistant Superintendent (Grade II) | Deputy Prison Officer | Assistant Prison Officer |
| Abbreviation | AS-I | AS-II | DPO | APO |

== Former Chiefs ==
- Sudesh Kumar IPS
- Dr. Shaik Darvesh saheb IPS
- Rishiraj Singh IPS
- R Sreelekha IPS
- Anil Kant IPS
- T P Senkumar IPS
- Lokanath Behera IPS
- Dr Alexander Jacob IPS

== See also ==
- Prisons in India
- Department of Home (Kerala)
- Viyyur High Security Prison
- Viyyur Jail Park
- Poojapura Central Jail
- Kannur Central Prison
