= Padukad =

Village in Kerala, India

Padukad is a village near Thrissur in the state of Kerala, India. It is located near the northern border of the corporation area. The village contains one temple and no mosque or churches. A nearby Roman Catholic Church is at Viyyur Velankanny matha church Viyyur. The nearest mosque is at Patturaikkal.

Padukad Bus stop is in main route, Thrissur-Shornoor road, just five km from Thrissur North Bus stand. The nearest landmark is the Viyyur High Security Prison. While coming from Thrissur, the bus stop comes after Viyyoor Central Jail stop. From bus stop towards west one road goes that is the main street of Padukad. This road end on railway way tracks.

Road both side populated with low or medium income family of Hindus. By cast Ezhavas and Ezhuthassan, Christian (RC) family also are there. Aloor Attathra House is prominent among them. Aloor Attathra Ouseph (alias) Joseph is the living head person of the family.

From bus stop towards east, one road goes towards Door Darshan Kendra which further goes alongside an irrigation canal. The most popular Vimala International Aquatic Academy is on the way within 200 meters from Padukad bus stop.
