= Lokanath Behera =

EX Indian Police Service officer

Loknath Behera
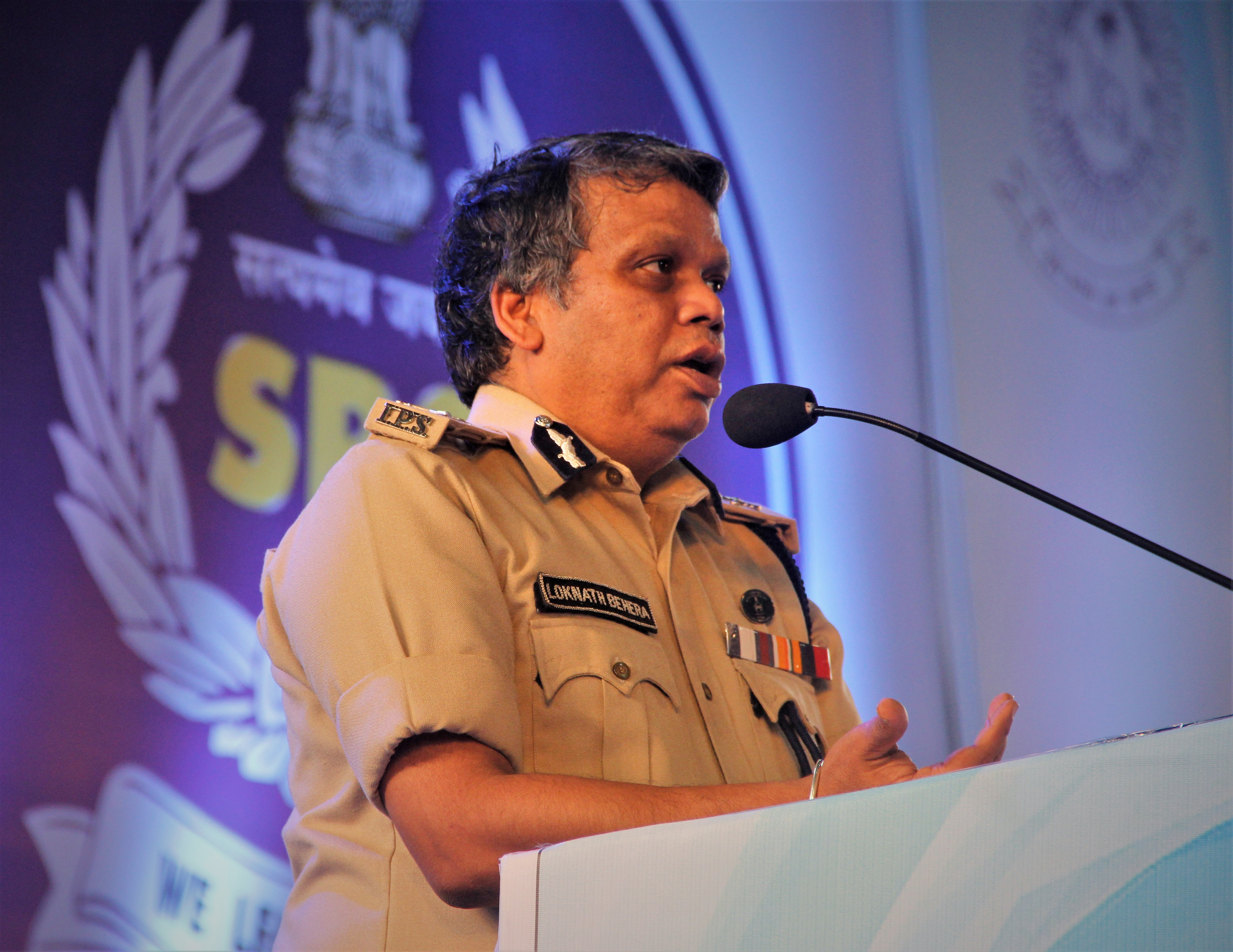
- Behera in 2018

Managing Director, Kochi Metro Rail Limited
- In office 31 August 2021 – 31 August 2026

State Police Chief of Kerala
- In office 1 July 2017 – 30 June 2021
- Preceded by: T. P. Senkumar IPS
- Succeeded by: Anil Kant IPS

State Police Chief of Kerala
- In office 1 June 2016 – 6 May 2017
- Preceded by: T. P. Senkumar IPS
- Succeeded by: T. P. Senkumar IPS

Director, Vigilance and Anti Corruption Bureau, Kerala
- In office 1 April 2017 – 15 February 2018
- Preceded by: Jacob Thomas IPS
- Succeeded by: N. C. Asthana IPS

Director General of Prisons and Correctional Services, Kerala
- In office 1 June 2015 – 8 December 2015
- Preceded by: T. P. Senkumar IPS
- Succeeded by: Rishi Raj Singh IPS

Director General of Kerala Fire and Rescue Services

Personal details
- Born: 17 June 1961 (age 65) Bhubaneswar, Odisha, India
- Occupation: Police officer
- Police career
- Department: Kerala Police
- Service years: 1985–2021
- Status: Retired DGP
- Rank: Director General of Police
- Batch: 1985
- Cadre: Indian Police Service (Kerala Cadre)
- Awards: President's Police Medal for Distinguished Service

Loknath Behera (born 17 June 1961) is a retired Indian Police Service (I.P.S.) officer. He was state police chief and director general of police of the Kerala State Police, and is the former director of Vigilance in the state of Kerala, after T. P. Senkumar IPS was reappointed as the Kerala state police chief and director general of police following the verdict of the honorable Supreme Court of India. Behera is from Odisha. He was one of the founding members of the National Investigation Agency (NIA). He was also instrumental in modernizing the Kerala police, equipping it with modern vehicles and state-of-the-art small arms and non-lethal weaponry.

He was reappointed as managing director of Kochi Metro Rail Limited on 28 August 2021 by the government of Kerala.

On 30 August 2026, his term as Managing Director of Kochi Metro Rail Limited ended.

== Education ==
Behera holds a master's degree in geology from Utkal University.

== Career ==
Behera was appointed to the IPS in 1985 and is a part of the Kerala cadre. He started his career as an ASP, in Kerala and also served as Commissioner of Police in Kochi and DCP in Thiruvananthapuram.

He was then appointed as SP and later DIG in the Central Bureau of Investigation. He was involved in the investigation of sensitive cases such as the Graham Staines murder case, Purulia arms drop case, Mumbai serial blast case, etc.

In 2009, Behera became one of the founding members of the NIA. At the NIA, he headed the terror financing and fake currency-specialized cell of the NIA.

Prior to being appointed as the director general of the Kerala Police, he served as director of the Kerala Fire and Rescue Services. He was a part of the team that traveled to the United States to question David Headley in 2010.

Behera retired from service on 30 June 2021.

== Awards ==
While on deputation at the NIA, Behera was awarded the President's Police Medal for Distinguished Service in 2009.
