= Viyyur High Security Prison =

Prison in Thrissur, India

High Security Prison, Viyyur
- Interactive map of High Security Prison, Viyyur
- Location: Viyyur, Kerala; 10.5574°N 76.2208°E
- Status: Operational
- Security class: Maximum
- Capacity: 535
- Population: 125 average
- Opened: July 3, 2019; 7 years ago
- Managed by: Kerala Prisons and Correctional Services Department
- Director: Sri. Rajeev T.R
- Website: www.keralaprisons.gov.in/high-security-prison-viyyur.html

The Viyyur High Security Prison is a high tech, high-security prison situated in Viyyur, Thrissur city, Kerala, India. Half of the prison will be located underground to resist aerial attack. The prison can accommodate 300 people.

== History and facilities ==
Kerala Chief Minister Oommen Chandy laid the foundation stone for the first high security prison on 17 June 2011 at Viyyur, Thrissur City. The prison would be constructed in a 10-acre plot adjacent to Central Prison, Viyyur at an expense of ₹20 crore and is expected to be completed in two years. The prison will have two compound walls, six-layered security scanning for visitors and CCTV in every cell, double-layer peripheral wall, five watch towers, a hi-tech video conference hall for trials, two hydraulic gates, single cells for solitary confinements and a hospital with mini-operation facility. A 250 sq ft lawn would be developed surrounding the prison wall to avoid hand grenade attacks and personnel with a technical background would be deployed at the new facility.
