= Viyyur Jail Park =

Park in Thrissur, India

- Freedom Park
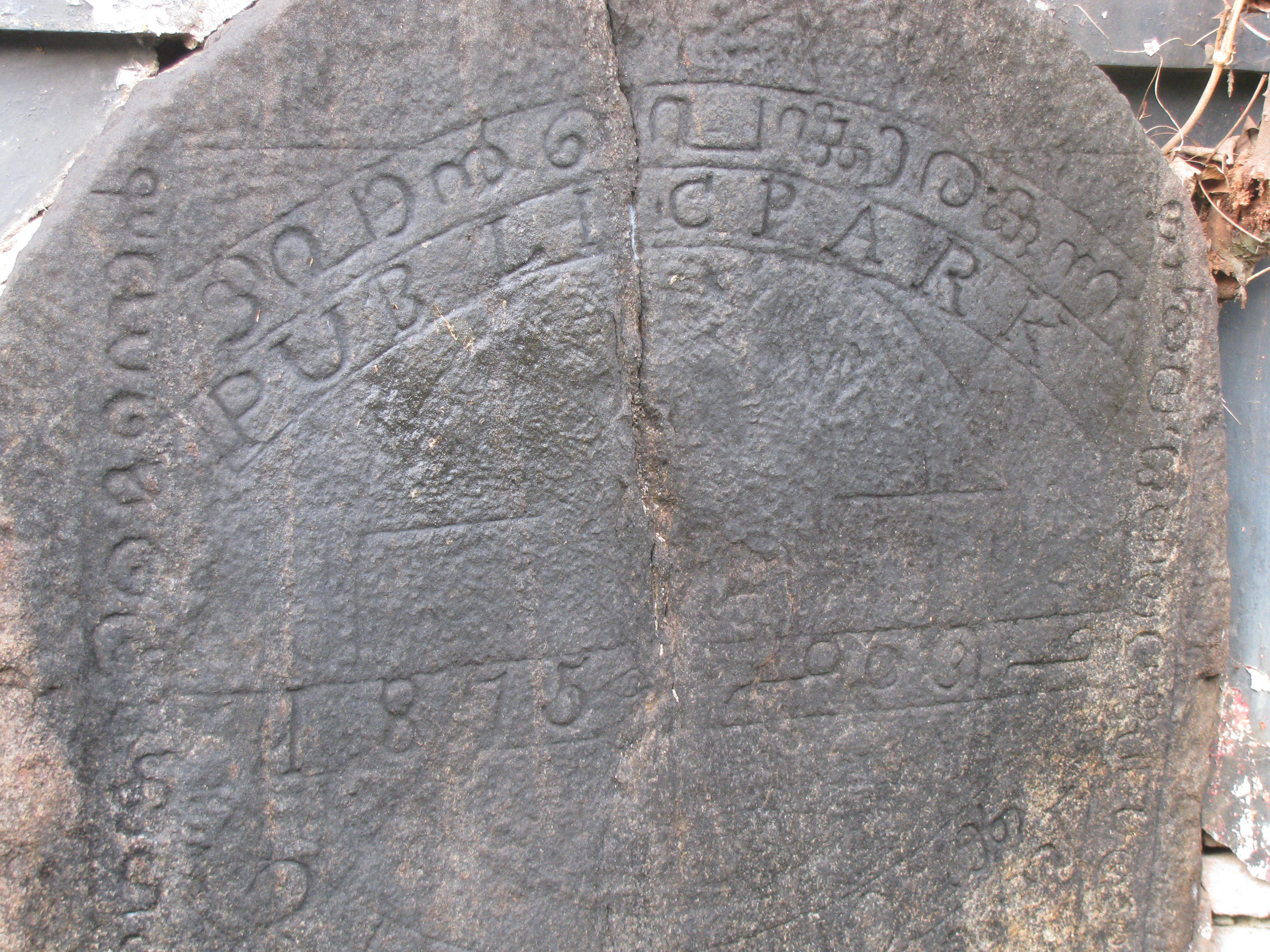
- Foundation Stone of Viyyur Park
- Type: Public park
- Location: Viyyur, Thrissur City, India
- Area: 60 acres (24 ha)
- Created: 1875
- Operator: Central Prison, Viyyur
- Status: Open all year

Viyyur Jail Park is recreational park situated near the Central Prison, Viyyur in Thrissur City of Kerala. The park is the oldest park in Kerala state.

== History ==
The park was created by Parukutty Nethyar Amma, the wife of Maharaja Rama Varma XVI in 1875 in her own land. When Central Prison, Viyyur was shifted to Viyyur from Thrissur city, the same land was used to build the jail. The park now shares a wall with the jail. On her instructions, the park was regained after the jail was shifted. For decades the park was languishing but was later taken over by the Central Prison, Viyyur. In 2013, the Thrissur MLA released the fund to rebuild the park.
