= List of prisons in Rajasthan =

The Government of Rajasthan has established the Jail department to manage 145 jails. Mainly Ajmer, Bharatpur, Bikaner, Jaipur, Jodhpur, Kota and Udaipur are seven zones.

== Ajmer Zone ==
A total of twenty one jails are in Ajmer zone.

- Four central jails are in Ajmer
1. Central Jail Ajmer
2. High Security Jail
3. Jail Training Institute
4. Women Reformatory Ajmer
- One 'A' Category district prison is in Tonk.
- Two 'B' Category district prison are in Bhilwara and Nagaur.
- Ten Sub Jails are in Ajmer.
1. Beawar
2. Deedwana
3. Gulabpura
4. Gangapur
5. Jahazpur
6. Malpura
7. MandalGarh
8. Merta City
9. Parbatsar
10. Shahpura
- Four open air camps are in Tonk open air camp, Nagaur open air camp, Bhilwara open air camp and Ajmer open air camp.

== Bharatpur Zone ==
Twelve jails are in Bharatpur zone.

- Two central jail in Bharatpur Central Jail Bharatpur and Women Reformatary Bharatpur,
- One 'A' category district prison is in Dhaulpur.
- Two 'B' Category district prison are in Sawai Madhopur and Karauli.
- Four sub jails are in Bharatpur.
1. Bayana
2. Deeg
3. Hindaun City
4. Gangapur City
- Three open air camps are in Bharatpur open air camp, Dholpur open air camp and Karoli open air camp.

== Bikaner Zone ==
Twenty five jails are in Bikaner zone.

- Three central jails are Central Jail Bikaner, Central Jail Ganganagar and Women Reformatary Bikaner in Bikaner zone.
- There is no 'A' category jail in Bikaner.
- Three 'B' category jails are in Hanumangarh, Churu and Bikaner.
- Nine sub jails are in Bikaner.
1. Nokha
2. Shri karanpur
3. Raisingh Nagar
4. Suratgarh
5. Bhadra
6. Nohar
7. Rajgarh
8. Ratangarh
9. Anupgarh

Ten open air camps are in Bikaner.

1. Jaitsar Ganganagar open air camp
2. Agricultural Tr. Bichwal Bikaner open air camp
3. Hanumangarh open air camp
4. A.R.F. Ganganagar open air camp
5. Those sheep C.R.C Bicwal Bikaner open air camp
6. Narsinghpur Birani Ganganagar open air camp
7. Goluwala Hanumangarh open air camp
8. S. K. G. Padampura Ganganagar open air camp
9. Pakkasarna Hanumangarh open air camp
10. Sh.G.G sithal Belasar Bikaner open air camp

== Jaipur Zone ==
Twenty two jails are in Jaipur zone.

- Three central jails Central Jail Jaipur, Central Jail Alwar, Women Reformatory Jaipur are in Jaipur.
- There is no 'A' category district prison in Jaipur.
- Four 'B' Category district prison are in Dausa, Jhunjhunu, Sikar and Jaipur.
- Eight sub jails are in Kotputli, Sambhar, Bandikui, Khetri, Neem Ka Thana, Fatehpur, Behror, Kishangarh Bas.

Seven open air camps are in Jaipur zone.

1. Sanganer open air camp
2. Durgapura open air camp
3. Alwar open air camp
4. Sikar open air camp
5. Jhunjhunu open air camp
6. Khatu Shyam open air camp
7. Dausa open air camp

== Jodhpur Zone ==
Twenty three jails are in Jodhpur zone.

- Three central jails are Central Jail Jodhpur, Women Reformatory Jodhpur and Young Offenders Reformatory Jaitaran in Jodhpur zone.
- There is no 'A' category prison in Jodhpur zone.
- Five 'B' category district prisons are in Barmer, Jaisalmer, Jalore, Pali and Sirohi.
- Ten sub jails are in Bilara, Phalodi, Balotara, Sanchore, Bhinmal, Pokharan, Bali, Jaitaran, Sojat City and Abu Road.
- Five open air camps are in Jodhpur zone.
1. Mandore open air camp
2. Keshwana (Jalore) open air camp
3. Barmer open air camp
4. Jaisalmer open air camp
5. Sirohi open air camp

== Kota Zone ==
Sixteen jails are in Kota zone.

- Two Central jails are in Kota zone.
1. Central Jail Kota
2. Women Reformatory Kota
- There is no 'A' category district jail in Kota zone.
- There are three 'B' category district jails are in Baran, Bundi and Jhalawar.
- Seven sub jails are in Ramganjmandi, Sangod, Chhabra, Nainwa, Aklera, Bhawani Mandi and Atru in Kota zone.
- Four open air camps are in Kota zone.
1. Kota open air camp
2. Jhalawar open air camp
3. Bundi open air camp
4. Baran open air camp

== Udaipur Zone ==
Twenty five jails are in Udaipur zone.

- Two Central jails are in Udaipur zone.
1. Central Jail Udaipur
2. Women Reformatory Udaipur
- There is no 'A' category district jail in Udaipur zone.
- There are five 'B' category district jails are in Banswara, Chittorgarh, Dungarpur, Pratapgarh and Rajsamand in Udaipur zone.
- Twelve sub jails are in Kanod, Jhadol, Kotda, Mavali, Salumber, Kusalgarh, Sagwada, Bhim, Begu, Choti Sadari, Kapasan and Nimbahera in Udaipur zone.
- Six open air camps are in Udaipur zone.
1. Udaipur open air camp
2. Pratapgarh open air camp
3. Chittorgarh open air camp
4. Dungarpur open air camp
5. Banswara open air camp
6. Rajsamand open air camp

== Open Prisons ==
The Open prison system was started in 1955 in Rajasthan and prisoners are governed by The Rajasthan Prisoners Open Air Camp Rules, 1972. Thirty-nine open air camps are in Rajasthan in seven divided zones.

== Central Jails ==
Nineteen Central Jails are in Rajasthan in seven zones.

== See also ==
- Prisons in India
