= Nelliyode Vasudevan Namboodiri =

Indian dancer (1940–2021)

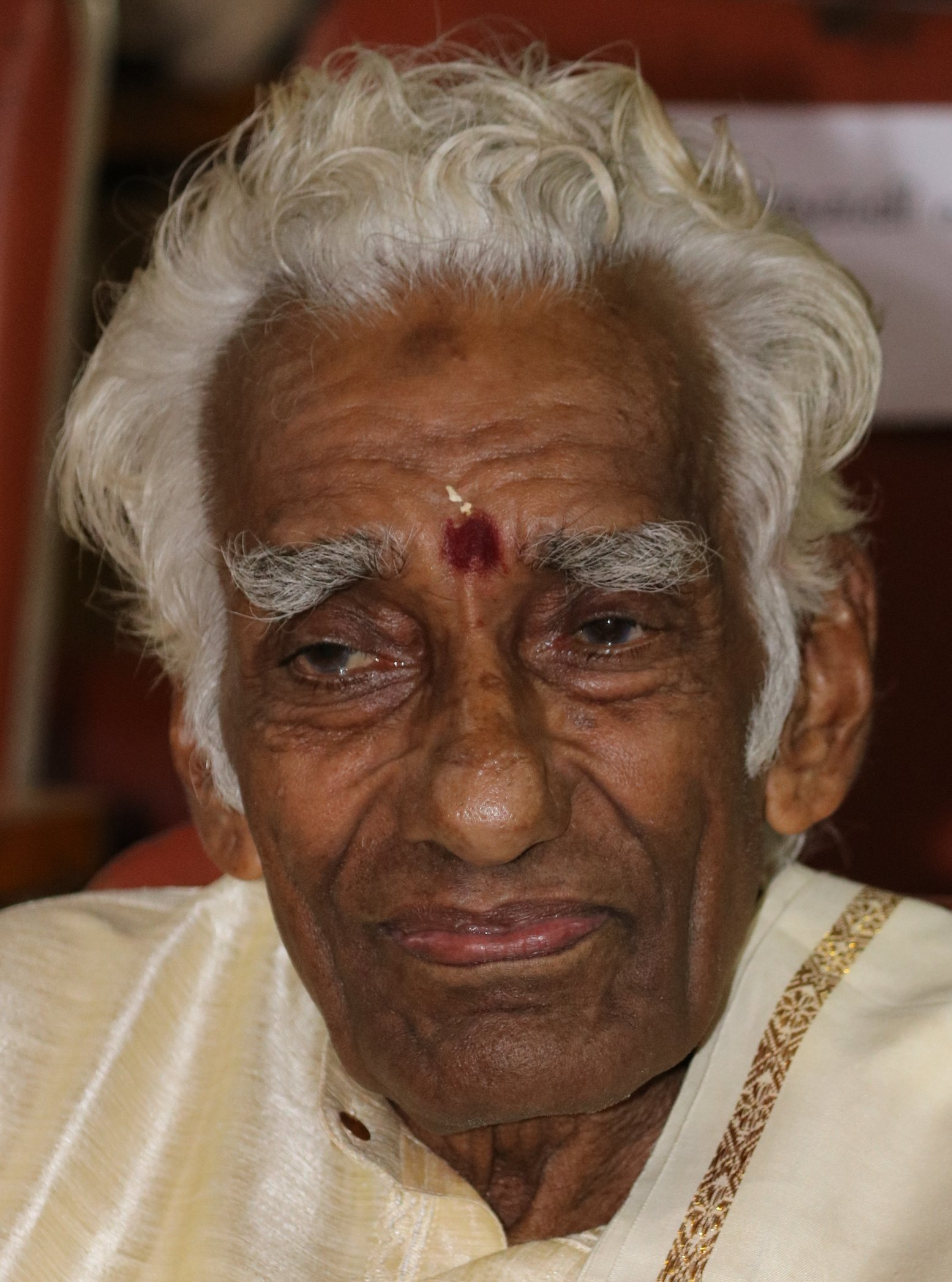
- Nelliyode Vasudevan Namboodiri while receiving Kerala Sangeetha Nataka Akademi Fellowship 2019, Kollam
- Born: February 5, 1940; Cheranelloor, Ernakulam district, Kerala, British Raj
- Died: August 2, 2021 (aged 81)
- Occupation: Kathakali artist

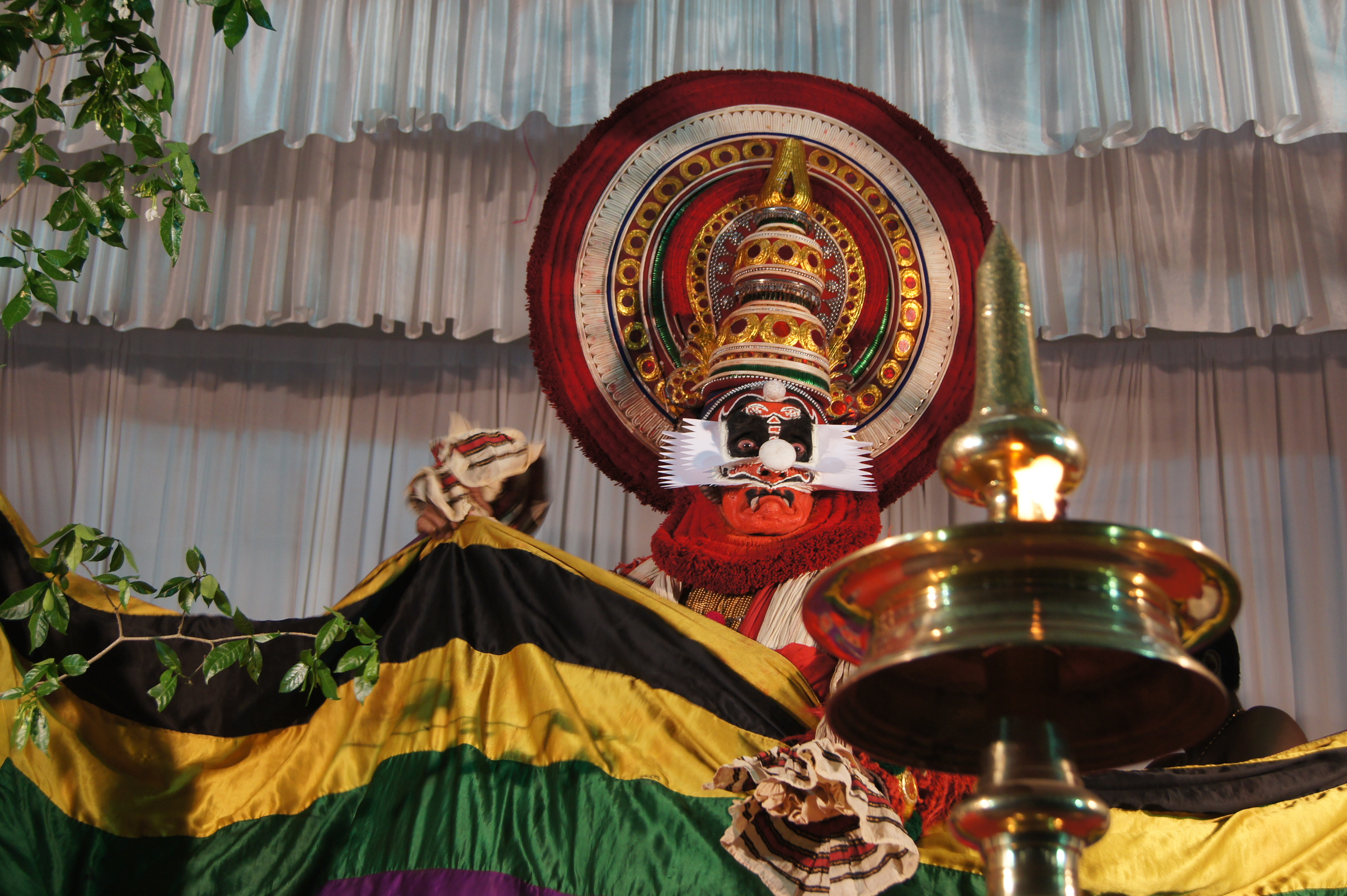
Sri Nelliyode Vasudevan Namboodiri as Kamhasura in Sri Mookambika Mahathmyam Kathakali held on 8 February 2015 at Thodupuzha

Nelliyode Vasudevan Namboodiri or Nelliyod Vasudevan Namboodiri (5 February 1940 – 2 August 2021) was a Kathakali artiste, noted primarily for his vibrant portrayal of the evil chuvanna thaadi ("red beard") roles of the classical Kathakali dance-drama from Kerala in south India. He was also very famous and known for the characters 'Kuchelan' from Kuchelavritham and 'Aashaari' from Bakavadham.

== Career ==
Nelliyode was born in 1940 in Cheranalloor in Ernakulam district. He joined the PSV Natyasangham in Kottakkal in 1957 and received training in Kathakali largely under Padma Shri Vazhenkada Kunchu Nair of the tradition. After a teaching stint in Kerala Kalamandalam, he joined as a Kathakali teacher at the Central High School in Thiruvananthapuram. Nelliyode lived in Poojappura near Thiruvananthapuram.

== Awards ==
Nelliyode has received the Central Sangeet Natak Akademi Award and the Kerala Sangeetha Nataka Akademi Award (1999). He has also received Rigatta's 'Natyaratna' title and gold medal in 1976, Thulaseevana award in 1988, Kalamandalam award, Central Government Fellowship, and Onamthuruth temple's 'Natyavisarad' title and the Kerala State Kathakali Prize for 2013.

== Repertoire ==
In Kathakali, Nelliyode is primarily famous for his playing cruel characters like Kali Nalacharitham, Trigartan, Dushasanan, Bakan, and Veerabhadran. He also excelled in pious roles like Kuchelan (Sudama) besides demonic kari roles such as Nakrathundi, Simhika, Soorpanakha, Lanka Lakshmi, and the black-bearded Kaatalan (woodsman). Possessing deep knowledge in Sanskrit and the Hindu Puranas, Nelliyode was also capable of presenting Patakam, a classical temple art requiring skills in oratory, and has played the role of the Fool in a production of King Lear.

== Significance ==
Nelliyode is regarded as the leading player of the destructive ‘tamasic’ characters in Kathakali. He has presented a deeper interpretation of these characters and emphasised their central role in the plays.

== Death ==
Nelliyode Vasudevan Namboothiri died on 2 August 2021 at the age of 81. He was suffering from pancreatic cancer for some time.
