= Prisons in India =

Prison administration of India

Prisons in India are mainly categorised as central, district and sub-jails. While these jails handle most long-term and short-term inmates, there are five other types of jails including for women and Borstal schools. As per the Constitution of India, prisons fall under the State List, making their administration the responsibility of State Governments. There are 1332 prisons in India as of end-2023, up from 1319 in 2021, with a total capacity to house 4,39,119 prisoners. Rajasthan has the highest number of prisons (155), while Uttar Pradesh reported the highest capacity (65,866).

In 2023, the total number of prisoners nationwide was 5,30,333. 73.5% of all prisoners were undertrials, 25.6% were convicts, while 0.7% were detenues (detainees).

After the COVID-19 pandemic, the number of prisoners increased 13% from 2020 to 2021, making over 80% of the prisons overcrowded. After a Supreme Court order, a number of prisoners were released in 2020 to decongest the jails in view of the pandemic, reducing the overall prison occupancy in 20 states and two Union Territories to a little over 93%. However, the occupancy rate increased to 130% again by 2021, before dropping to 120.8% in 2023. End-2023 occupancy rates ranged from 200.2% in Delhi to 4.7% in Lakshadweep. Among the major states, Rajasthan, Andhra Pradesh, Tamil Nadu, Odisha and Telangana reported less than 100% occupancy.

Indian jails are overcrowded and eight out of ten prisoners await trial. In 2023, 150 unnatural deaths took place in Indian prisons, including 96 suicides, down from 185 in 2021.

== Background ==
Prisons, and their administration, is a state subject covered by item 4 under the State List in the Seventh Schedule of the Constitution of India. The management and administration of prisons falls exclusively in the domain of the State governments, and is governed by the Prisons Act, 1894 and the Prison manuals of the respective state governments. Thus, the states have the primary role, responsibility and authority to change the current prison laws, rules and regulations. The Central Government provides assistance to the states to improve security in prisons, for the repair and renovation of old prisons, medical facilities, development of borstal schools, facilities to women offenders, vocational training, modernization of prison industries, training to prison personnel, and for the creation of high security enclosures.

The Supreme Court of India, in its judgements on various aspects of prison administration, has laid down 3 broad principles regarding imprisonment and custody. First, a person in prison does not become a non-person. Second, a person in prison is entitled to all human rights within the limitations of imprisonment. Third, there is no justification for aggravating the suffering already inherent in the process of incarceration.

According to 2021 National Crime Records Bureau data, Indian prison population had 77% undertrials, while only 22% convicts, with almost half of the undertrials in prison for more than 2 years. Out of 5,54,000 prisoners, 4,27,000 were awaiting trial, out of which 24,033 undertrials were already in jail for three to five years. The occupancy rate of prisons was 130%. At the end of 2023, this had slightly improved to 73.5% undertrials and 25.6% convicts, with an occupancy of 120.8%.

== Prisons management and administration ==
Prison administration in India is a state subject under the Seventh Schedule of the Constitution, meaning each state is responsible for the management and regulation of its own prisons and correctional institutions. The overall responsibility lies with the respective State Governments, under the administrative control of the Home Department. The prisons department is responsible for the custody, care, rehabilitation, and reintegration of offenders.

The Director General of Prisons (designation varies state to state) heads the state prison department, usually an officer from the Indian Police Service (IPS) of the rank of DGP or ADGP, supported by Additional DGs, Inspectors General of Prisons (IGs), Deputy IGs of Prisons, and Superintendents of Prisons. Individual jails and correctional facilities are managed by Superintendents of Prisons, assisted by Deputy Superintendents, Assistant Superintendents, and Jailors. Warder staff, including Head Warders and Warders, form the frontline personnel responsible for day-to-day security and inmate management.

=== Hierarchy ===
The nomenclature and designations varies state to state;

- Director General of Prisons and Correctional Services (IPS Cadre)
- Additional Director General of Police (Prisons)
- Inspector General of Prisons (if applicable)
- Deputy Inspector General Prisons
- Superintendent of Prisons
- Joint superintendent of Prisons (if applicable)
- Deputy Superintendent of Prisons
- Assistant Superintendent of Prisons
- Jailor / Deputy Jailor (if applicable)
- Assistant Jailor (if applicable)
- Chief Head Warders /Head Warder / Deputy Prison Officer / Chief Petty Officer
- Warder/ Assistant Prison Officer / Petty officer

== List of Prisons and Correctional Departments in India ==
| State / Union Territory | Prisons department |
States
| Andhra Pradesh | Andhra Pradesh Prisons Department |
| Arunachal Pradesh | Arunachal Pradesh Prisons Department |
| Assam | Assam Prisons Department |
| Bihar | Bihar Prison Administration |
| Chhattisgarh | Chhattisgarh Prisons Department |
| Goa | Goa Prisons Department |
| Gujarat | Gujarat Prisons Department |
| Haryana | Haryana Prisons Department |
| Himachal Pradesh | Himachal Pradesh Prisons Department |
| Jharkhand | Jharkhand Prisons Department |
| Karnataka | Karnataka Prisons and Correctional Services |
| Kerala | Kerala Prisons and Correctional Services |
| Madhya Pradesh | Madhya Pradesh Jail Department |
| Maharashtra | Maharashtra Prisons Department |
| Manipur | Manipur Prisons Department |
| Meghalaya | Meghalaya Prisons Department |
| Mizoram | Mizoram Prisons Department |
| Nagaland | Nagaland Prisons Department |
| Odisha | Odisha Prisons and Correctional Services |
| Punjab | Punjab Prisons Department |
| Rajasthan | Rajasthan Prisons Department |
| Sikkim | Sikkim Prisons Department |
| Tamil Nadu | Tamil Nadu Prisons and Correctional Services |
| Telangana | Telangana Prisons Department |
| Tripura | Tripura Prisons Department |
| Uttar Pradesh | Uttar Pradesh Prisons Administration & Reforms Services |
| Uttarakhand | Uttarakhand Prisons Department |
| West Bengal | West Bengal Correctional Services Department |
Union territories
| Andaman and Nicobar Islands | Andaman and Nicobar Islands Prisons Department |
| Chandigarh | Chandigarh Prisons Department |
| Delhi | Delhi Prisons |
| Jammu and Kashmir | Jammu and Kashmir Prisons Department |
| Ladakh | Ladakh Prisons Department |
| Puducherry | Puducherry Prisons Department |

== Types of prisons ==
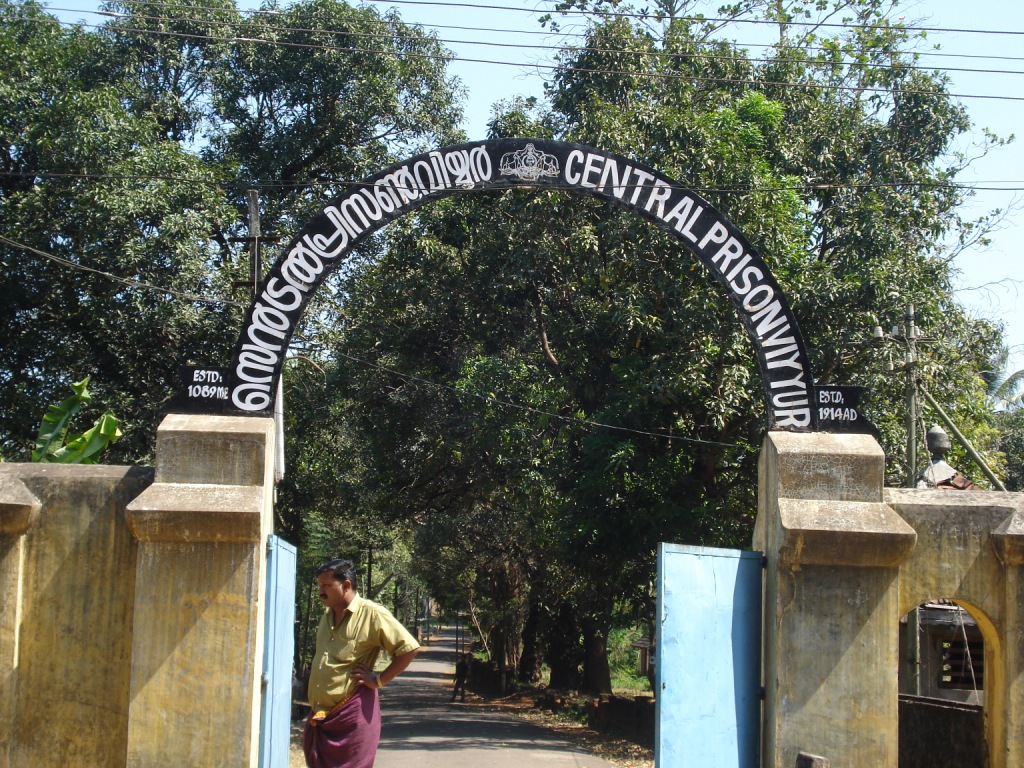
Entrance to the Central Prison in Viyyur, Thrissur district, Kerala.

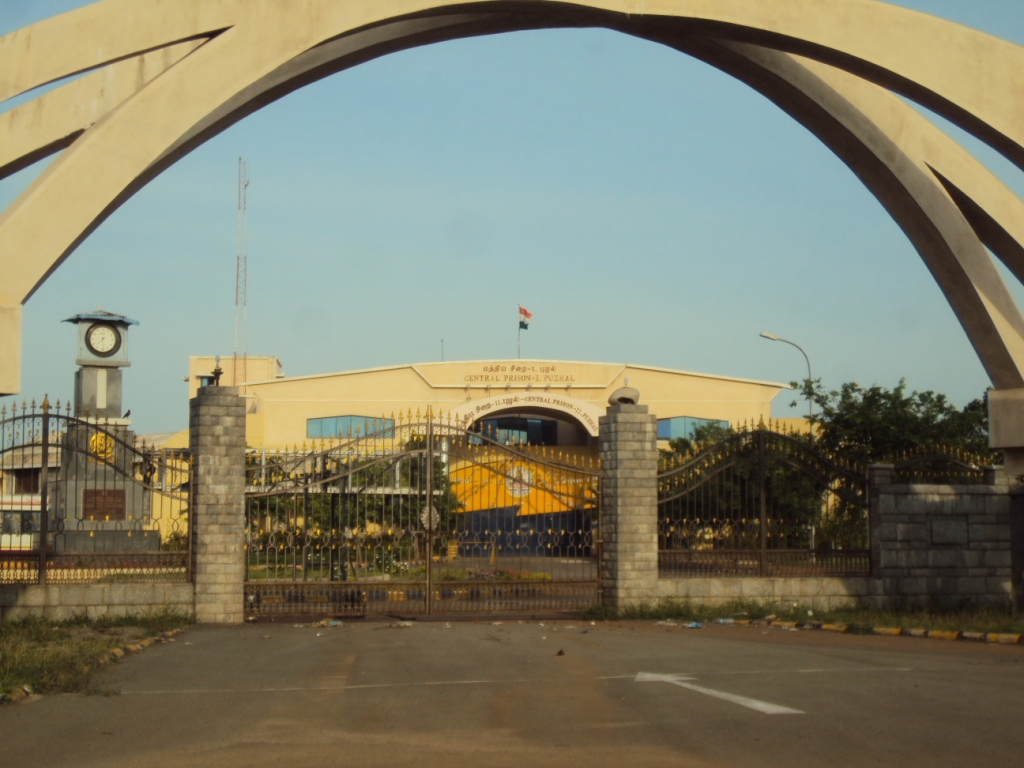
The Central Prison in Puzhal, Chennai.

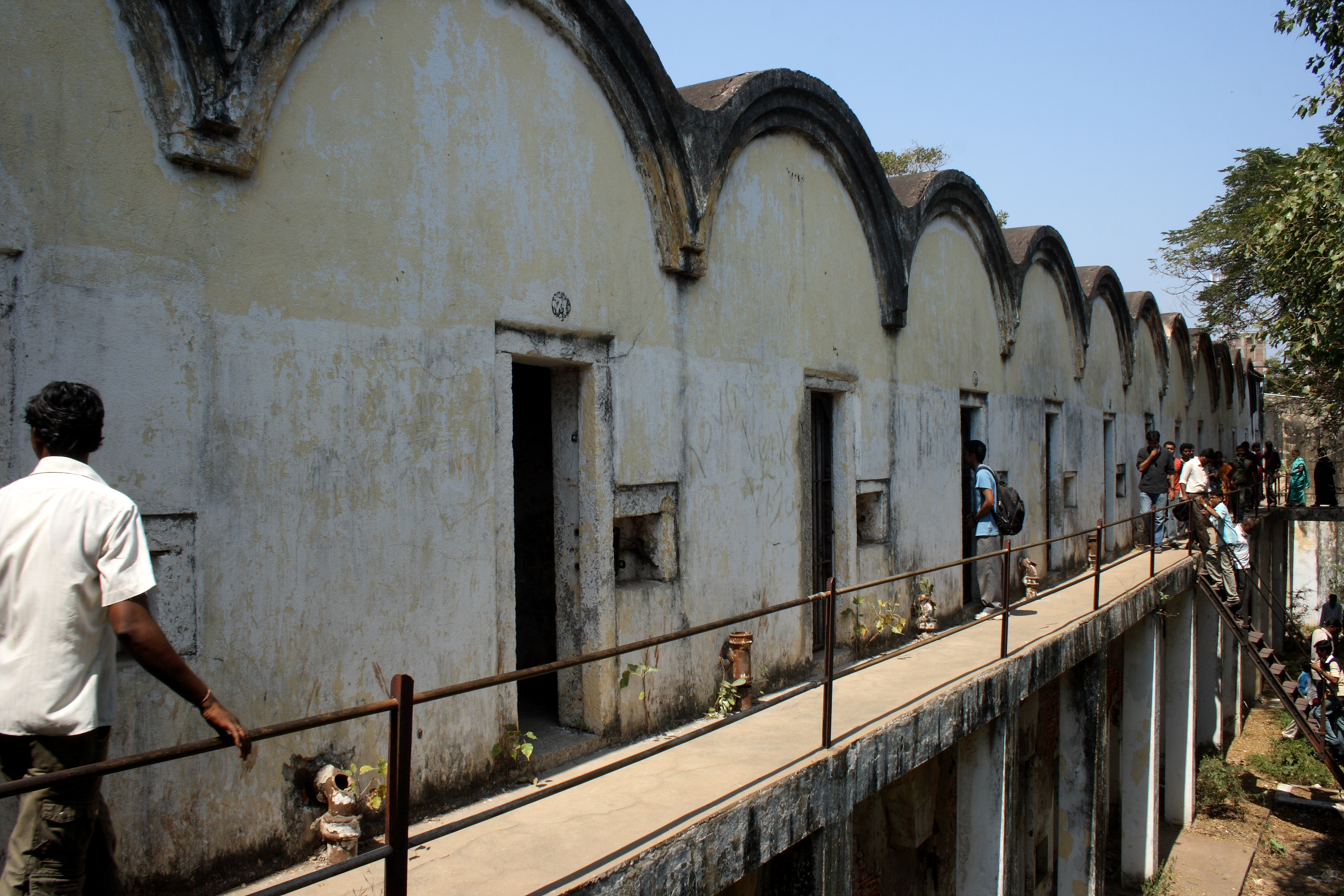
A section of the Madras Central Prison before demolition in 2009.

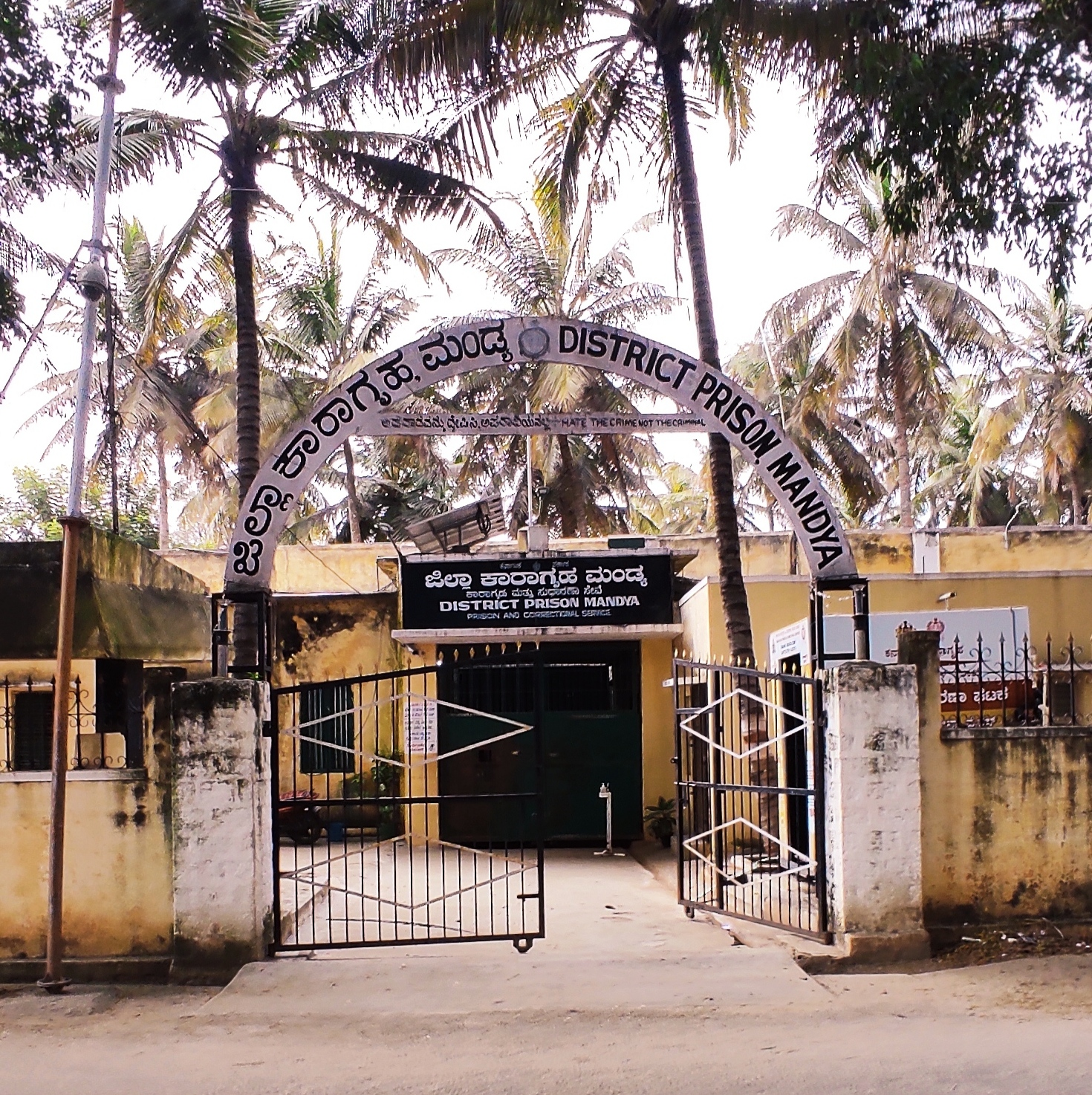
District prison in Mandya district, Karnataka.

Prison establishments in India exist at three levels—the taluka level, district level, and central (sometimes called zonal/range) level. The jails in these levels are called Sub Jails, District Jails, and Central Jails respectively. In general, the infrastructure, security, and prisoner facilities such as medical, educational and rehabilitation are progressively better from Sub jail to Central Jail. The other types of jail establishments are Women Jails, Borstal Schools, Open Jails and Special Jails. The following table shows the number of jails and available capacity across India as on 31 December 2023:

| Type | Number | Available capacity | Occupancy rate (%) |
|---|---|---|---|
| Central Jails | 152 | 198,150 | 120.7 |
| District Jails | 436 | 172,074 | 136.6 |
| Sub Jails | 549 | 43,800 | 87.3 |
| Women Jails | 35 | 7,086 | 60.6 |
| Borstal Schools | 10 | 1,180 | 36.1 |
| Open Jails | 101 | 7,201 | 63.7 |
| Special Jails | 47 | 9,065 | 92.3 |
| Other Jails | 2 | 563 | 47.6 |
| Total | 1,332 | 439,119 | 120.8 |

=== Central jail ===
The criteria for a jail to be categorised as a Central Jail varies from state to state. However, the common feature observed throughout India is that prisoners sentenced to imprisonment for a long period (more than two years) are confined in the Central Jails, which have larger capacity in comparison to other jails. These jails also have rehabilitation facilities.

Delhi has the highest number of Central Jails (14), followed by Madhya Pradesh (11), Punjab (10), Maharashtra, Rajasthan and Tamil Nadu (9 each), and Bihar, Karnataka and West Bengal (8 each).

Arunachal Pradesh, Meghalaya, Andaman and Nicobar Islands, Dadra and Nagar Haveli, Daman and Diu, Ladakh and Lakshadweep do not have any Central Jails.

=== District jail ===
District jails serve as the main prisons in states and union territories where there are no Central Jails.

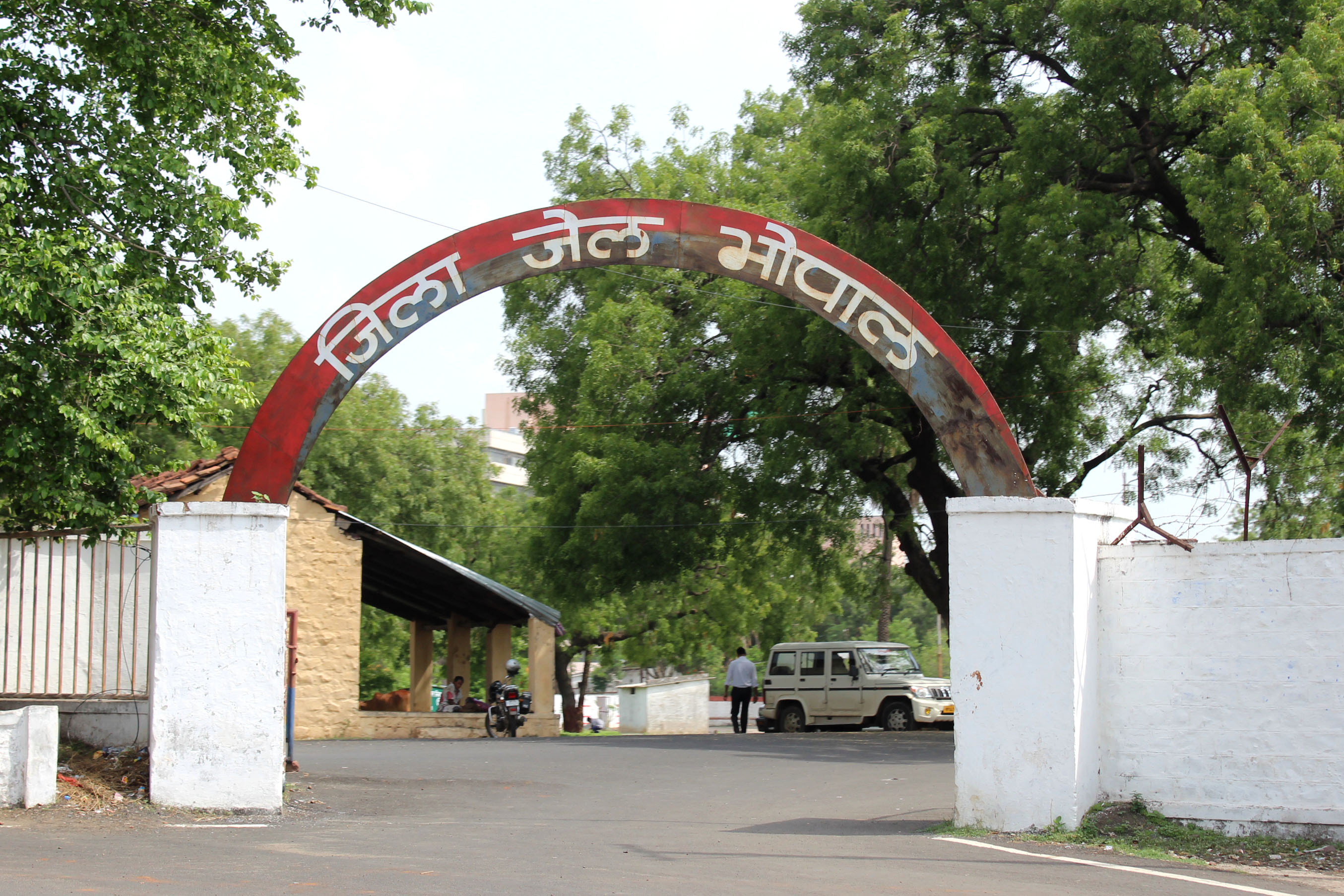
District old jail Bhopal

States which have considerable number of District Jails are Uttar Pradesh (64), Madhya Pradesh (41), Bihar (31), Maharashtra (28), Rajasthan (26), Assam (22), Karnataka (21), Chhattisgarh (20), Haryana (17), Jharkhand (16), West Bengal and Kerala (13 each), Gujarat (12), and Nagaland (11).

=== Sub jail ===
Sub jails are smaller institutions situated at a sub-divisional level in the States.

Eight states have reported comparatively higher number of sub-jails revealing a well-organized prison set-up even at lower formation. These states are Tamil Nadu (104), Andhra Pradesh (91), Madhya Pradesh (73), Odisha and Rajasthan (60 each), West Bengal (30), Karnataka (22), and Telangana (19).

12 states or union territories have no sub-jails, namely Arunachal Pradesh, Goa, Haryana, Maharashtra, Manipur, Meghalaya, Mizoram, Nagaland, Sikkim, Chandigarh, Delhi and Ladakh.

=== Open jail ===
Open jails are minimum security prisons. Only convicted prisoners with good behavior satisfying certain norms prescribed in the prison rules are admitted in open jails. Minimum security is kept in such prisons and prisoners are engaged in agricultural activities. P. T. Chacko, as Home Minister of Kerala introduced the first Open Jail In India at Nettukaltheri near Neyyar Trivandrum on 28 August 1962.

Seventeen states have functioning open jails in their jurisdiction. Rajasthan reported the highest number of 50 open jails, followed by Maharashtra (19). There are no open jails in any of the union territories at the end of 2023.

=== Special jail ===
Special jails are maximum security prisons for the confinement of a particular class or particular classes of prisoners. Prisoners housed in special jails are generally been convicted of offences such as terrorism, violent crimes, habitual offenders, serious violations of prison discipline, and inmates showing tendencies towards violence and aggression.

Kerala has the highest number of special jails—16. Provision for keeping female prisoners in these special jails is available in Tamil Nadu, West Bengal, Gujarat, Kerala, Assam, Karnataka and Maharashtra.

=== Women’s jail ===
Women's jails are prisons that exclusively house female prisoners. Women's jails may exist at the sub-divisional, district and central (zone/range) level. There were 20 Women's Jails across India with a total capacity of 5,197 and an occupancy rate of 60.1% as on 31 December 2016. Due to the limited capacity of Women's Jails, most female prisoners are housed at other types of jails. As on 31 December 2016, around 83.12% of all female prisoners in India were incarcerated at jails other than a Women's Jail. Maharashtra has 5 women's jails. Kerala and Tamil Nadu each have 3 women's jails.

Over the past five years, there has been an increasing trend in the number of women prisoners in India. The population statistics say women account for only 4.3% of all prisoners which is about 17,834 women. According to a study in 2009, homicide was the single most common conviction offence for women in India.

=== Borstal school ===
Borstal schools are a type of youth detention centre and are used exclusively for the imprisonment of minors or juveniles. The primary objective of borstal schools is to ensure care, welfare and rehabilitation of young offenders in an environment suitable for children and keep them away from contaminating the atmosphere of the prison. The juveniles in conflict with law detained in borstal schools are provided various vocational training and education with the help of trained teachers. The emphasis is given on the education, training and moral influence conducive for their reformation and prevention of crime.

Nine states namely, Himachal Pradesh, Jharkhand, Karnataka, Kerala, Maharashtra, Punjab, Rajasthan, Tamil Nadu and Telangana have borstal schools in their respective jurisdictions. Tamil Nadu had the highest capacity for keeping 678 inmates. Himachal Pradesh and Kerala are the only states that have the capacity to lodge female inmates in 2 of their borstal schools. There are no borstal schools in any of the UTs at the end of 2015.

=== Other jails ===
Jails that do not fall into the categories discussed above, fall under the category of Other Jails. Three states—Karnataka, Kerala and Maharashtra—have 1 other jail each in their jurisdiction. No other state or union territory has any other jail at the end of 2016.

The capacity of inmates (both male and female) reported by these three States in such jails was highest in Karnataka (250) followed by Kerala (142), Goa (45) and Maharashtra (28).

== Budget ==
All states and union territories in India had a combined sanctioned budget of ₹10,035.6 crore (US$1.0 billion) in 2023–24, an increase of 15% over the previous fiscal, for prison related expenditure. Uttar Pradesh alone accounted for ₹2,037.4 crore (US$210 million) of the total budget.

Prison expenditure is broadly categorised as Plan Expenditure and Non-Plan Expenditure. Expenditure on specific planned activities under the Five Year Plan is termed as Plan Expenditure. Expenditure made for meeting day-to-day expenses and running establishments like payment of salaries, wages, rent, etc. come under the Non-Plan Expenditure. Non-Plan Expenditure may also include activities for development of existing infrastructure and bringing about improvements in the prisons.

Expenditure on prison inmates is categorised as Food, Clothing, Medical, Vocational/Educational facilities, Welfare and Other expenses. Food expenses account for 65% of the total expenditure on prison inmates.

== Prison population ==
=== Demographics ===
The National Crime Records Bureau data from 2019 shows that Muslims, Dalits and Tribal prisoners in India are disproportionate to their share in the Indian population. Muslims are 14.2% of the Indian population, but 16.6% convicts, 18.7% undertrials and 35.8% detenues in Indian prisons are Muslims. Dalits form 16.6% of the population, while 21.7% of convicted inmates, 21% undertrials and 18.15% detenues in Indian prisons are Dalits. Scheduled Tribes form 8% of the population, but they form 13.6% of convicts in Indian jails, while 10.5% of undertrials and 5.68% of detenues in prison. Among these, Muslims had more undertrials than convicts.

There were 433,003 prisoners in jails across India as on 31 December 2016. Males at 414,505 make up 95.73% of prisoners while females at 18,498 represent 4.27%. Most prisoners are between 30 and 50 years old (44.0%), followed by age group of 18–30 years (43.1%), and above 50 years (13.0%). Forty-one inmates were between the ages of 16 and 18 years as on 31 December 2016. There were 1,649 female prisoners with 1,942 children as on the same date. The education/literacy profile of prisoners as on 31 December 2016 was below matriculation (42%), illiterate (28.4%), above matriculation but below graduation (21%), graduated secondary school (5.9%), post graduates (1.8%), and technical diploma/degree holders (1%).

The majority of prisoners are housed in a jail from their home state. Around 91.1% of prisoners belonged to the state in which the prison is located, while 7.5% hailed from other states, and 1.5% were foreign citizens. The number of foreign prisoners in India was 6,370 as on 31 December 2016, a decrease of 5.4% from the previous year. Among convicted foreign prisoners, the highest number are from Bangladesh (75.7%, 1,792 convicts) followed by Nepal (8.9%, 211 convicts) and Myanmar (4.3%, 101 convicts).

The following table gives the population and occupancy rate of prisons in India annually:

| Year | No. of Inmates | | | Occupancy Rate (Note: Occupancy Rate means number of inmates staying in jails against the authorized capacity for 100 inmates.) |
| Year | Male | Female | Total | Occupancy Rate |
|---|---|---|---|---|
| 2009 | | | | 122.8% |
| 2010 | | | | 115.1% |
| 2011 | 356,902 | 16,024 | 372,926 | 112.1% |
| 2012 | 368,184 | 16,951 | 385,135 | 112.2% |
| 2013 | 393,804 | 18,188 | 411,992 | 118.4% |
| 2014 | 400,855 | 17,681 | 418,536 | 117.4% |
| 2015 | 401,789 | 17,834 | 419,623 | 114.4% |
| 2016 | 414,505 | 18,498 | 433,003 | 113.7% |
| 2017 | | | 450,696 | 115.1% |
| 2018 | 446,842 | 19,242 | 466,084 | 117.6% |

=== Types of prisoners ===
A "criminal prisoner" is defined as any prisoner duly committed to custody under the writ, warrant or order of any court or authority exercising criminal jurisdiction, or by order of a court-martial. All other prisoners are considered "civil prisoners". Prison inmates lodged in Indian jails are categorised as convicts, undertrials and detenues. A convict is a "criminal prisoner under sentence of a Court or Court-martial". An undertrial is a person who has been committed to judicial custody and against whom a criminal trial has been initiated by a competent authority (trial is in process and not yet disposed off). A detenue is any person detained in prison on the orders of the competent authority under the relevant preventive laws. As on 31 December 2021, 77% of prisoners were undertrials and 22% of the prisoners were convicts in India, with almost half of the undertrials were in prison for more than 2 years.

=== Types of offences ===
Among convicts, the highest number of inmates are serving sentences for convictions of murder (51.86%), rape (7.66%), offences under the NDPS Act (5.73%), attempted murder (5.30%), dowry deaths (3.88%), and theft (2.84%) as on 31 December 2016. The overwhelming majority of convicts, around 87.82%, are convicted of offences under the Indian Penal Code, while 12.05% are convicted under special and local laws. Among undertrials, the highest number of inmates are being held under charges of murder (22.14%), rape (8.71%), attempted murder (8.03%), theft (8.94%), offences under the NDPS Act (5.88%), and dowry deaths (4.43%) as on 31 December 2016. Around 80.73% of undertrials are charged with offences under the Indian Penal Code, while 19.25% are charged with violating special and local laws. About 2.8% of convicts admitted to jails across India in 2016 were repeat offenders.

=== Duration of sentences ===
The following table shows number and percentage of convict prisoners by the duration of their sentences as on 31 December 2016.

| Sentence | Death row | Life term | 10–13 years | 7–9 years | 5–6 years | 2–4 years | 1–2 years | 6–12 months | < 6 months |
| Number of convicts | 339 | 73,975 | 20,157 | 11,447 | 7,874 | 7,098 | 5,366 | 3,746 | 5,681 |
| % of convicts | 0.2 | 54.5 | 14.9 | 8.4 | 5.8 | 5.2 | 4.0 | 2.8 | 4.2 |

=== Prison conditions ===
Prison condition in India are bad and unhealthy as they are “frequently life threatening” and do not meet international standards. Prisons were severely overcrowded with an occupancy rate of 114%. Prison lacks so much funding that in some areas occupancy level is as high as 277%; almost three times the permitted capacity.

=== Labour ===
Only convicts sentenced to "rigorous imprisonment" have to undertake work during their prison term. A 2011 Hindustan Times article reported that 99% of convicts that receive such sentences rarely undertake work because most prisons in India do not have sufficient demand for prison labour. A 2020 report found that labour within the prisons of many states was assigned on the basis of caste since most prison manuals are still based on The Prisons Act of 1894.

=== Occupancy rate ===
One of the primary reasons for the overcrowding of prisons is the pendency of court cases. As on March 31, 2016, more than 30 million cases were pending in various courts, and two of every three prison inmates in the country are under trials. The 4,19,623 prisoners of 2015, for example, included 2,82,076 under trials, or 67%, according to NCRB data. Some other causes for big pre-trial population are corruption, role of police, prosecutors, and judiciary. Indian police system is heavily understaffed and underpaid. It contributes to high detainees population since there are less officials for accused prisoners to accompany them to court. So, their date for hearing keeps getting pushed back. Prosecutors in India are also substantially burdened. There are many vacant assistant posts, but no incentive has been made to fill those posts to fast track the process. Judiciary department also contributes to such extensiveness of pre-trial detainees. There is a back log of 30 million cases in India. With so many cases to handle, the number of judges in India is comparatively very low. There are only 10.5 judges on average per every million people. Many of the pre- trial detainees are poor and underprivileged. Even though for some of them bail is approved, they still cannot get out because they do not have the money or resources to payout the bail. Many of detainees are also uneducated and completely unaware of their rights. About 71% of pre-trial detainees are illiterate and do not even have a high school diploma.

== See also ==
- Capital punishment in India
- National Crime Records Bureau

Prison officers ranks:

- Inspector General of Prisons
- Deputy Inspector General of Prisons
- Assistant Inspector General of Prisons
- Superintendent of Jail

Prisons Departments:

- Kerala Prisons and Correctional Services

Related:

- Crime in India
- Law enforcement in India

List:

- List of prisons in India
