= Viyyoor Shiva Temple =

- Shiva Temple, Viyyoor, Thrissur, Kerala

Religion
- Affiliation: Hinduism
- District: Thrissur
- Deity: Shiva
- Festival: Maha Shivaratri

Location
- Location: Viyyoor
- State: Kerala
- Country: India
- Interactive map of Viyyoor Shiva Temple
- Coordinates: 10.5486°N 76.2108°E

Architecture
- Type: Architecture of Kerala

Specifications
- Temple: One
- Elevation: 32.17 m (106 ft)

Viyyoor Shiva Temple is a Hindu temple located at Viyyoor, Thrissur, Kerala, India. It is situated on the northern bank of Puzhakkal river. The main deity is Lord Shiva in an angry form, installed facing west. The sub-deities include Lord Ganapathi, Lord Sastha, Goddess Kali and Snake gods. The temple is located on the side of State Highway 39 connecting Kodungallur and Shoranur, which passes through the eastern side of the temple.
