= Poojappura Central Prison =

Prison in India

Central Prison & Correctional Home, Poojappura
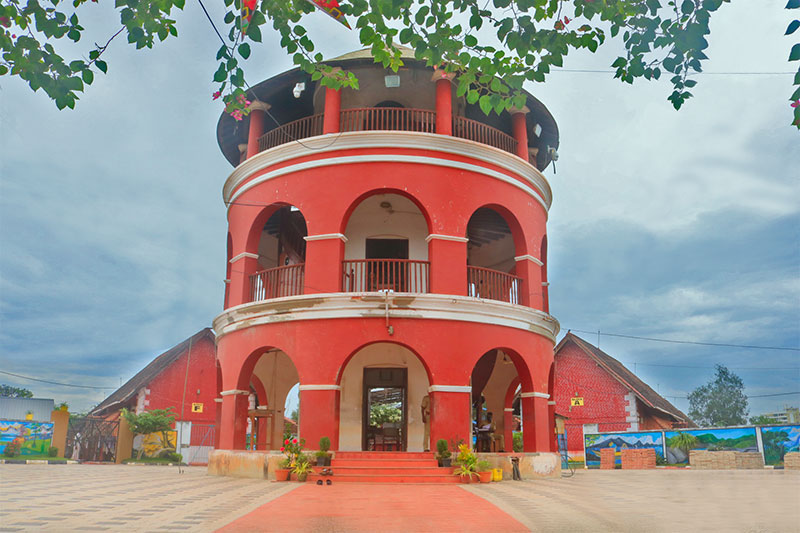
- Location: Poojappura, Thiruvananthapuram, Kerala, India
- Status: Operational
- Security class: Central Prison and Correctional Home
- Capacity: 727
- Population: 1400 (average daily lockup)
- Opened: 1886
- Managed by: Kerala Prisons and Correctional Services Government of Kerala
- Director: Director General of Prisons and Correctional Services
- Website: www.keralaprisons.gov.in/central-prison-poojappura.html

Central Prison and Correctional Home, Poojappura, also known as "Poojappura Central Jail", or "Central Prison, Thiruvananthapuram", is a jail in Poojappura in Thiruvananthapuram in the Indian state of Kerala. It was established in1886 as a part of Travancore It is one of three Kerala prisons along with Kannur and Thrissur.

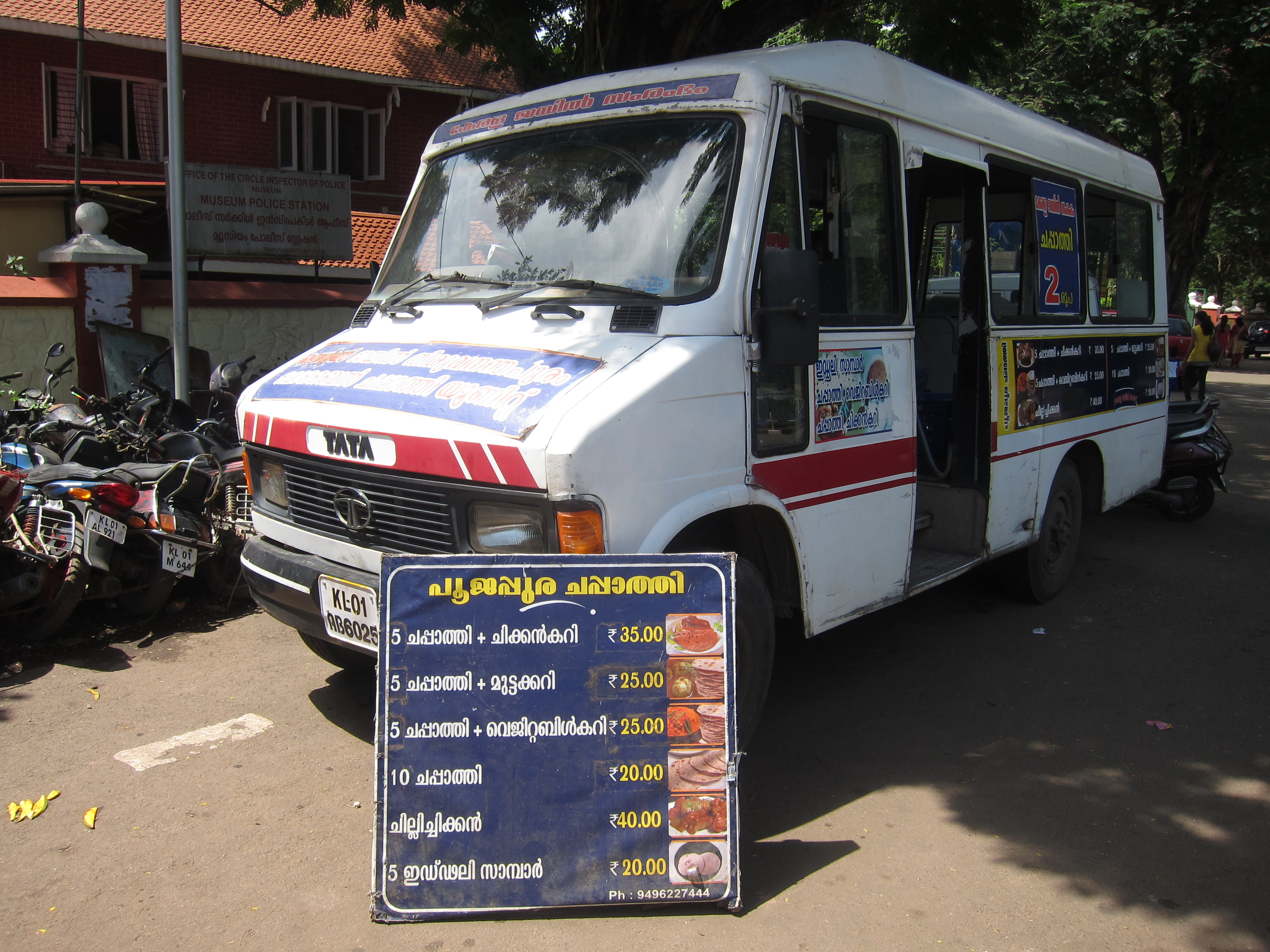
Poojappura Chapati Sales Center

== Notable inmates ==
- Vaikom Muhammad Basheer – activist and writer; released in 1943
- Dharmarajan – convicted in the Suryanelli rape case
- K.P. Jayanandan – serial killer; escaped and was recaptured in 2013
- Kayamkulam Kochunni – legendary outlaw; possibly
- Rosamma Punnoose – activist and politician; was arrested along with her sister; was released in 1942
