= Kannur Central Prison =

Prison in Kannur, India

Kannur central Prison
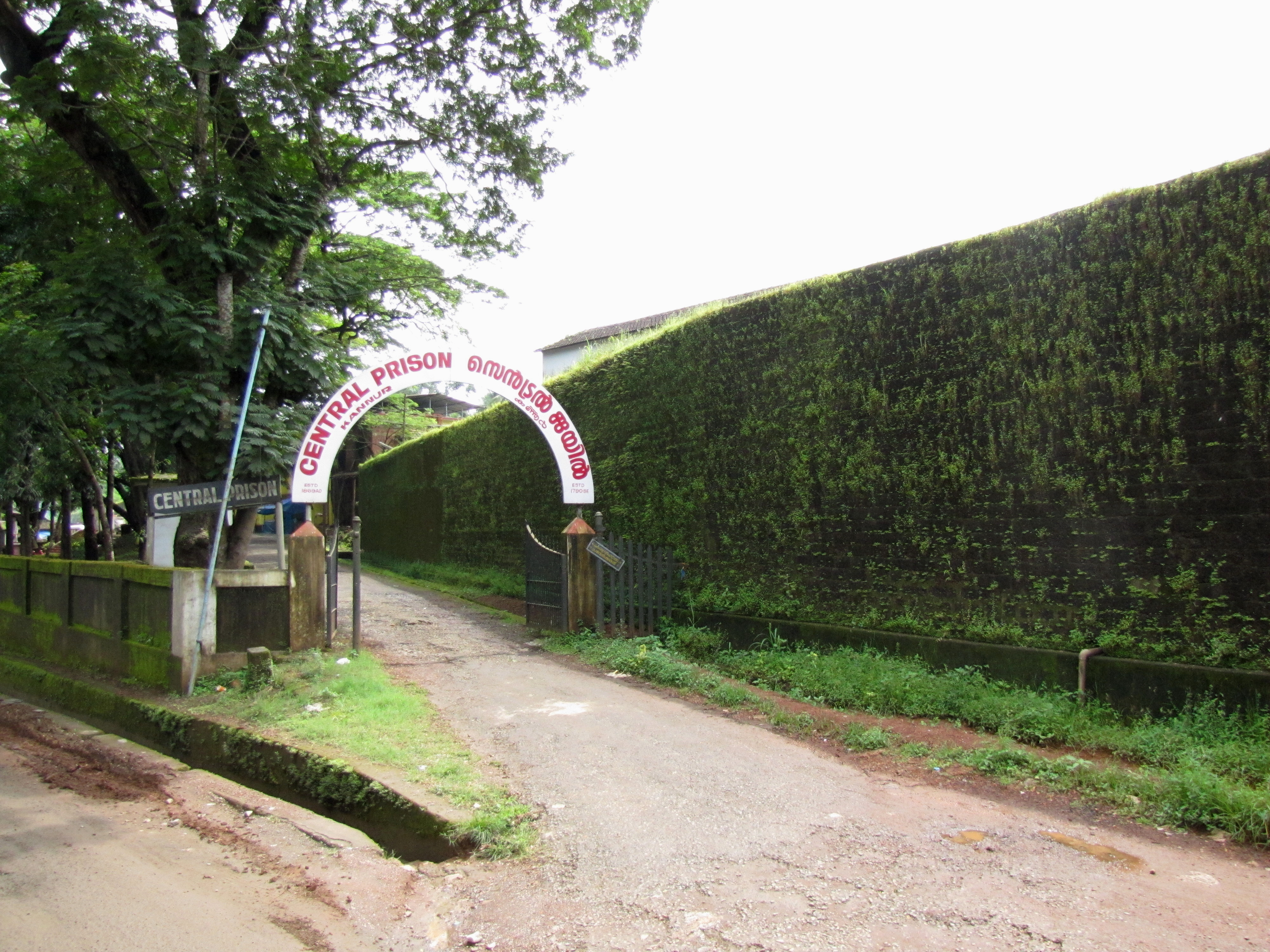
- Location: Pallikkunnu, Kannur, Kerala, India
- Status: Operational
- Security class: Central Prison
- Capacity: 2000
- Opened: 1869
- Managed by: Department of Kerala Prisons and Correctional Services
- Director: Superintendent of Central Prison
- Website: www.keralaprisons.gov.in/central-prison-kannur.html

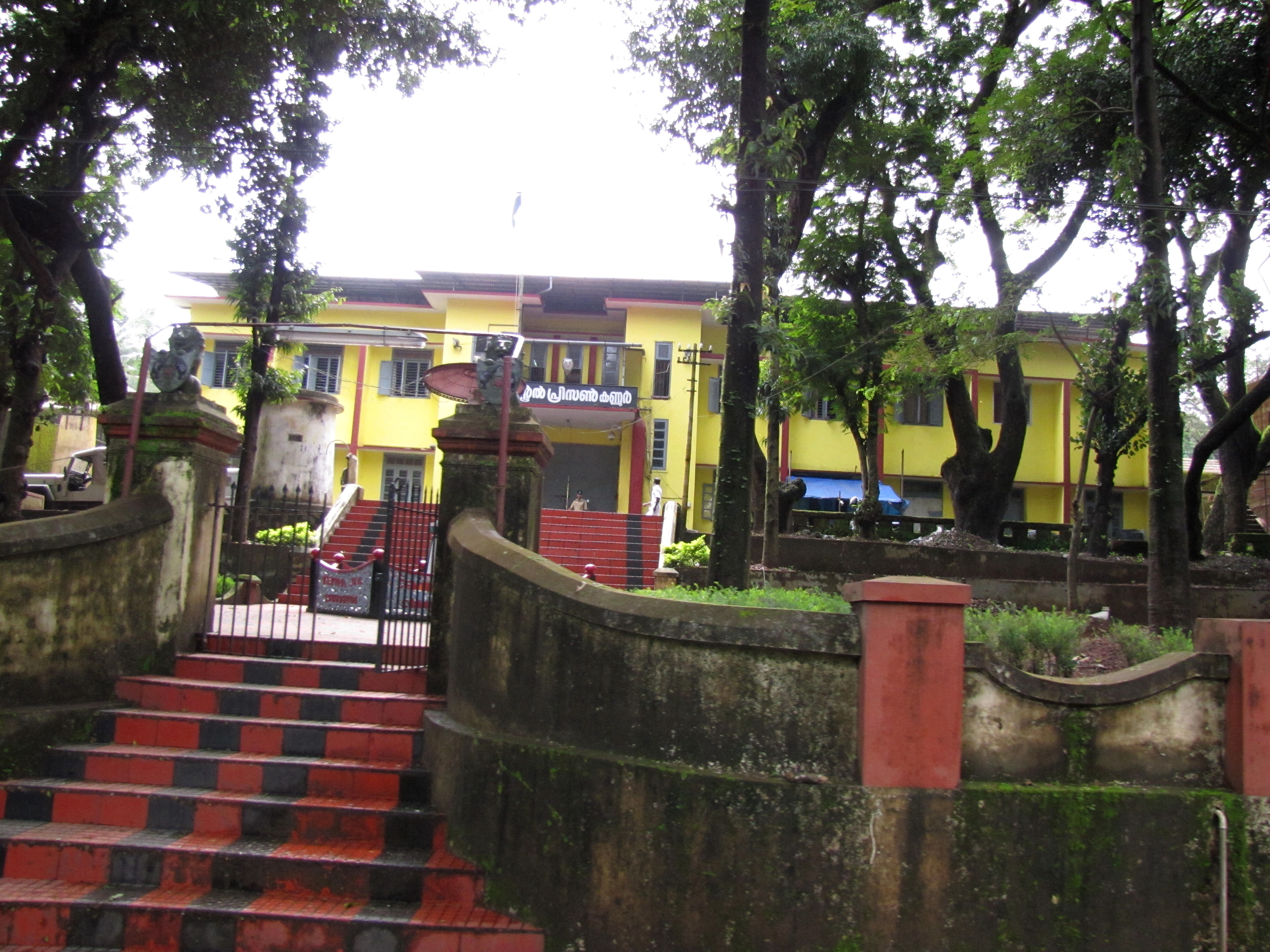
Central Prison Front View

Central Prison & Correctional Home, Kannur, is situated in Pallikkunnu in Kannur, Kerala state of India. It was the first Central Jail established in Kerala in the year of 1869. It is authorised to accommodate 1062 prisoners. It is one of the three central prisons other than Thiruvananthapuram, Thrissur situated in Kerala.

Kannur Central Prison is the first one in India to have a literature festival screening, it was an initiative by the Wayanad Literature Festival (2024).
