= Kannur North =

- suburb
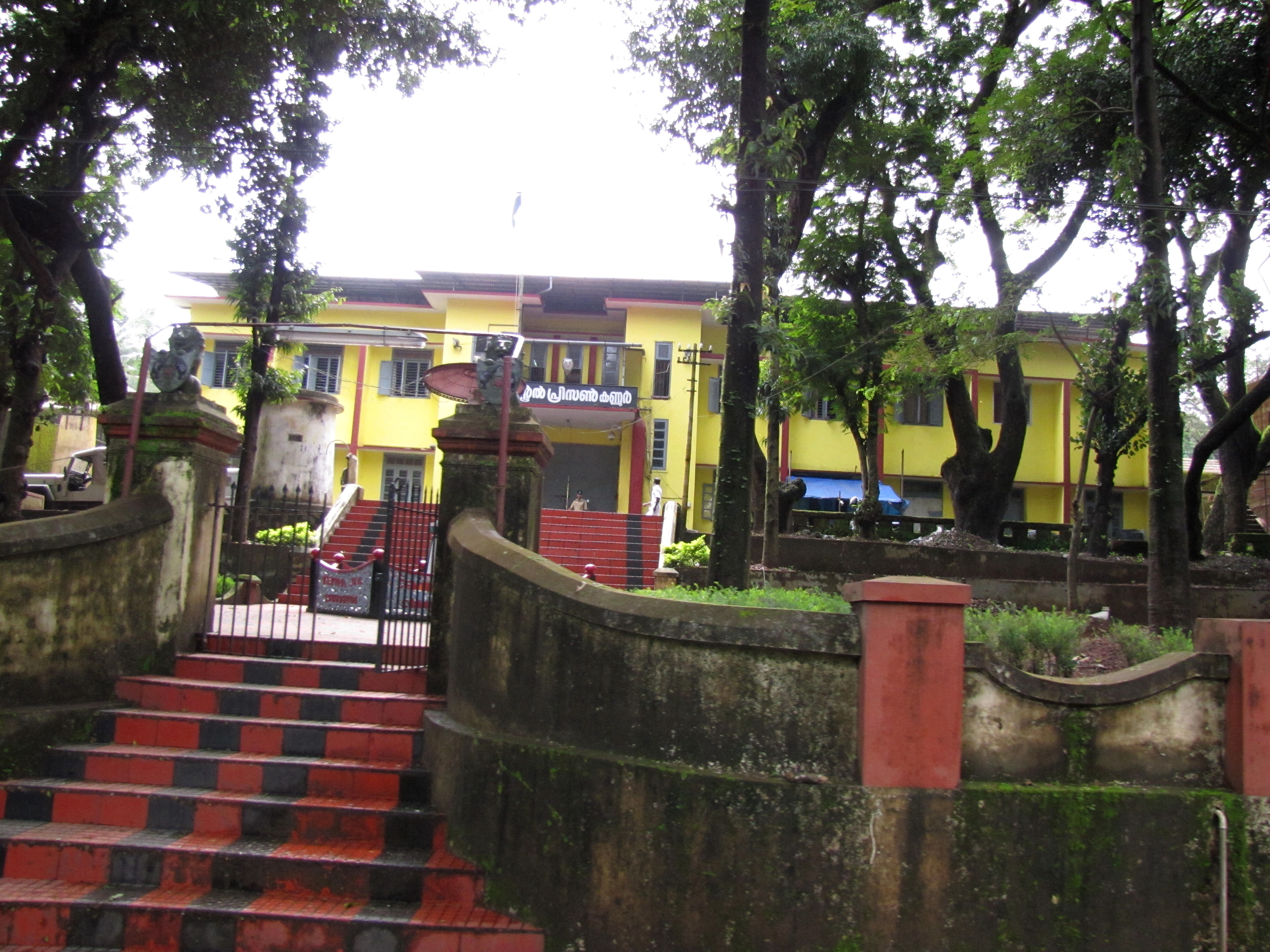
- Prison at Podikkundu
- Interactive map of Kannur North
- Coordinates: 11.8937000°N 75.3532100°E
- Country: India
- State: Kerala
- District: Kannur

Population (2001)
  - Total: 26,963

Languages
  - Official: Malayalam, English
- Time zone: UTC+5:30 (IST)
- ISO 3166 code: IN-KL

Kannur North is a suburb of Kannur city in the state of Kerala, India.

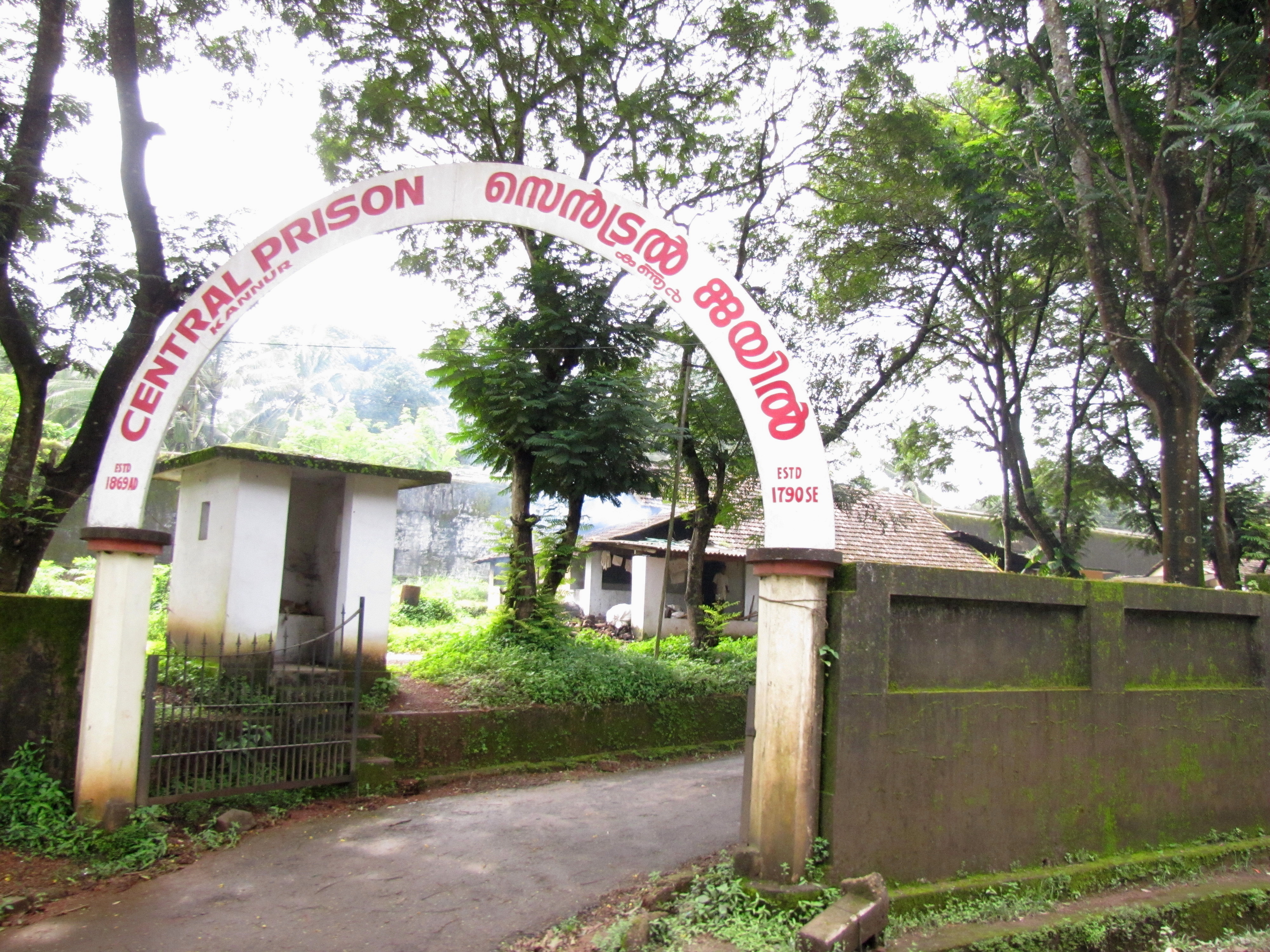
Central Prison

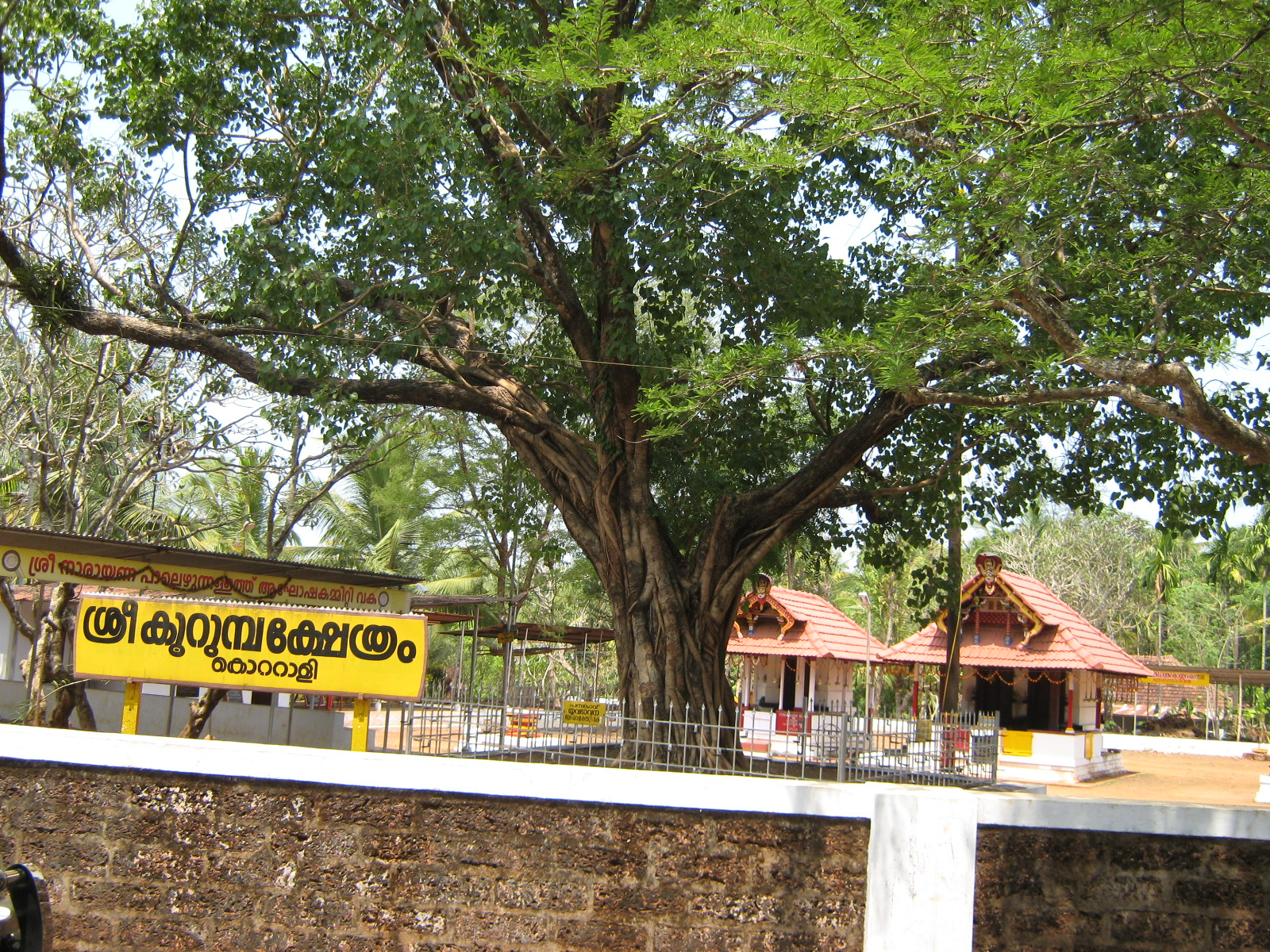
Kottali Temple

== Commercial Area ==
Kannur North is a busy commercial area of Kannur city. Many transport companies and wholesale dealers have opened their offices here. Marble merchants and other heavy duty shops are also common here. National Highway 66 passes through Kannur North.

== Suburbs and townships ==
- Pallikunnu. 26,963 people
- Chirakkal. 43,290 people
- Puzhathi. 33,470 people
- Azhikode. 42,354 people
- Valapattanam 8,920 people
- Pappinisseri. 35,134 people

== Important landmarks ==
- Government Women's College, Kannur
- Central Prison, Podikkundu, The Kannur Central Prison is situated at Pallikkunnu, on the Kannur-Kasaragod Highway.
- Akashvani, Prasar Bharati
