= Poojappura =

- town
- Nickname: "Soul of Thiruvananthapuram"
- Location in Kerala, India
- Coordinates: 8.4834100°N 76.981010°E
- Country: India
- State: Kerala
- District: Thiruvananthapuram

Languages
  - Official: Malayalam, English
- Time zone: UTC+5:30 (IST)
- PIN: 695012
- Telephone code: 0471
- Vehicle registration: KL-01
- Lok Sabha constituency: Thiruvananthapuram

Poojappura is a suburb of Thiruvananthapuram in India. It is known as heart of Thiruvananthapuram city. It is located in the south-east part of the city, surrounded by Jagathy, Karamana, Mudavanmugal and Thirumala. This place was once used as the worship place during the Navaratri festival season. The name Poojappura comes from the fact that it was here that the King of Travancore used to arrive during Mahanavami celebrations for the pooja (worship). There is the big Kavadi Procession on Vijayadeshami day with over 700 Kavadis, Paravakavadi, Suryakavadi, Mayilkavadi, Agnikavadi etc.

Poojappura is known for housing the Central Prison (Central Jail) of Kerala. The central jail is one of the oldest in the state and was built by British Engineers during Travancore Reign. The State Education Department (Pareeksha Bhavan), Head Office of HLL Lifecare Limited (formerly Hindustan Latex Limited), Local Head Office of State Bank of India (former head Office of State Bank of Travancore), Bharatheeyam Charitable Trust is located here.

== Notable persons ==
- M. Jayachandran - music composer
- P. Kesavadev - novelist, fiction writer
- Mohanlal - actor, film producer, playback singer, film distributor, and director
- Gopinath Muthukad - magician who established the Magic Academy at Poojappura
- Nelliyode Vasudevan Namboodiri - Kathakali artist
- Padmarajan - Malayalam film director
- Namitha Pramod - actress
- Priyadarshan - Indian film director
- Poojappura Ravi - Malayalam comedian actor
- G. Shankar - architect
- Shobana - actress and dancer
- Prithviraj Sukumaran - Malayalam film actor and director
