= Rishiraj Singh =

Retired Indian Police Service Officer

Rishiraj Singh IPS
- Born: 23 July 1961 (age 65); Bikaner, Rajasthan, India
- Education: Sardar Vallabhbhai Patel National Police Academy, Hyderabad
- Known for: Excise commissioner Transport Commissioner Chief Vigilance Officer, KSEB
- Police career
- Country: India
- Allegiance: Indian Police Service
- Department: Kerala Police
- Service years: 1985–2021
- Status: Retired
- Rank: Director General of Police
- Badge no.: 19851069
- Batch: 1985
- Cadre: Kerala
- Awards: PPMDS-2009

Rishiraj Singh (born 23 July 1961) is a retired Indian Police Service (I.P.S.) officer. He was a Director General of Prisons and Correctional Services of the Kerala. He retired on July 31, 2021 as the Director General of Police (Prisons).

== Career ==
Rishiraj Singh is an I.P.S. officer of 1985 Batch of Kerala Cadre. He belongs to Bikaner, Rajasthan. He started his career as an ASP in Keralam and later worked in different capacities in Kerala such as Police Commissioner of Cochin, Calicut City, Deputy Police Commissioner at Trivandrum City, Superintendent of Police at Kottayam and Kannur. He worked in Special Protection Group (SPG) as Deputy Inspector General of Police (DIG) from 1999 to 2004 when Sri. Atal Bihari Vajpayee was Prime Minister. He worked as the Joint Director of CBI, in Mumbai from 2008 to 2013. He, on his own, detected the ‘ADARSH’ scam; got the approval of registration of FIR and supervised the whole investigation. He has been awarded the Police medal for meritorious services in 2001 and Police Medal for distinguished Services in 2012.

He took charge as joint director CBI's ACB Central Zone, Bhopal in January 2013. He was posted to Thiruvananthapuram as the Transport Commissioner on June. As transport commissioner in Kerala, he worked relentlessly for strict implementation of traffic laws and got the traffic accidents reduced by 30%. Deaths occurring in accidents were also reduced. He later became Excise Commissioner, Keralam.
