= T. P. Senkumar =

Retired IPS officer

Dr T. P. Senkumar
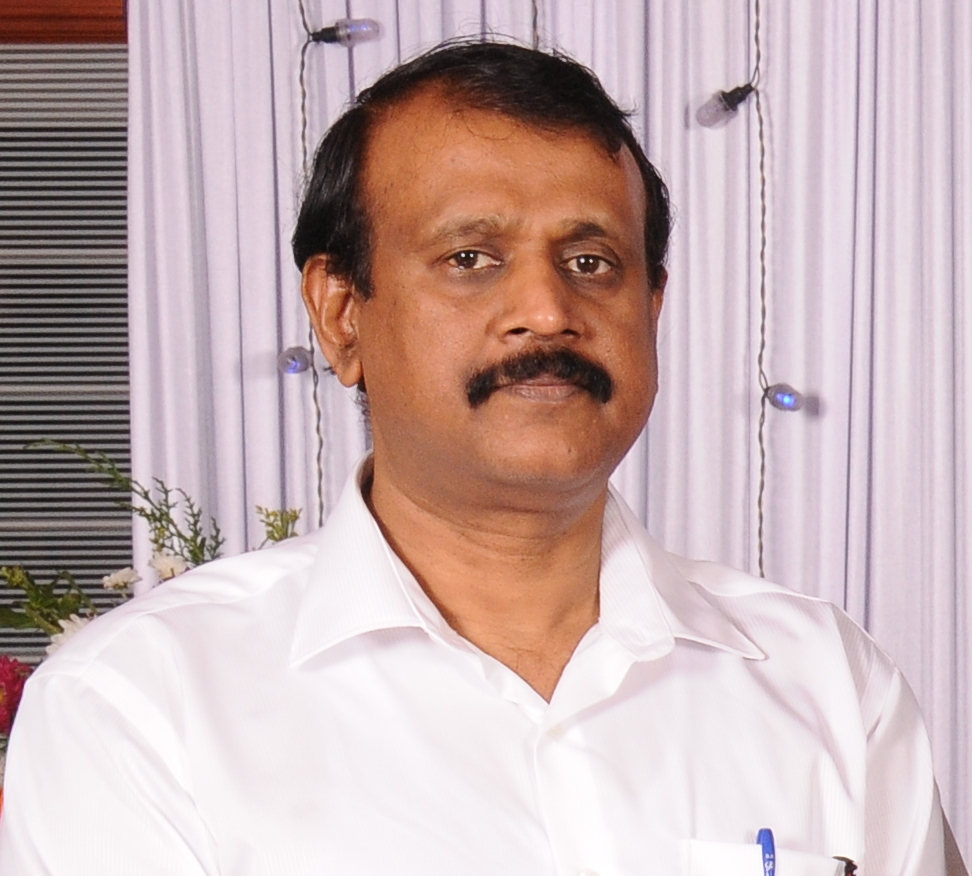
- Senkumar in 2011
- Born: 10 June 1957 (age 69); Kadukutty, Thrissur district, Kerala
- Police career
- Country: India
- Allegiance: Indian Police Service
- Department: Kerala Police
- Service years: 1983–2017
- Status: Retired
- Rank: Director General of Police
- Awards: President's Police Medal for Distinguished Service
- Other work: Politician; Bharatiya Janata Party (2017–present)

T. P. Senkumar (born 10 June 1957) is an Indian lawyer and retired police officer who served in the Indian Police Service (IPS). He is notable for his tenure as the State Police Chief of Kerala.

== Early life ==
Senkumar was born in Trichur district of Keralam. He studied at St. George L.P. School and St. Mary's High School. He completed his BSc in Physics from Christ College, Irinjalakuda. He then earned his MA in Economics from Dr. John Matthai Centre at Calicut University's Department of Economics in 198 in Thrissur. His LLB came from Government Law College, Thiruvananthapuram. Later, he graduated with a PhD from the University of Kerala for his thesis on road accidents, under M. A. Oommen.

== Career ==
In 1981, he was enlisted into Indian Economic Service (IES. In 1983, he was selected for the Indian Police Service (IPS) and joined the Kerala cadre. After training, he was posted as Assistant Superintendent of Police (APS) in Thalasserry and Kannur. Upon promotion to Superintendent of Police (SP), he served as Commandant of the APTC and KAP I & III Battalions.

He was appointed the State Police Chief on 31 May 2015, replacing K. S. Balasubramaniam IPS, who retired on 31 May 2015. Senkumar had more than 2 years left before retirement, which was considered while making the appointment. He became head of the Police Housing Construction Corporation on 31 May 2016, appointed by the then newly-elected LDF government.

On 24 April, 2017, the Supreme Court of India ordered the reinstatement of Senkumar as State Police Chief. The government subsequently reappointed him to the position on 5 May, 2017.

== Recognition ==
In 2009, Senkumar was awarded the President's Medal for Distinguished Service.
