= Viyyur Central Prison =

Prison in Thrissur, India

Coordinates: 10.56°N 76.22°E

Central Prison, Viyyur
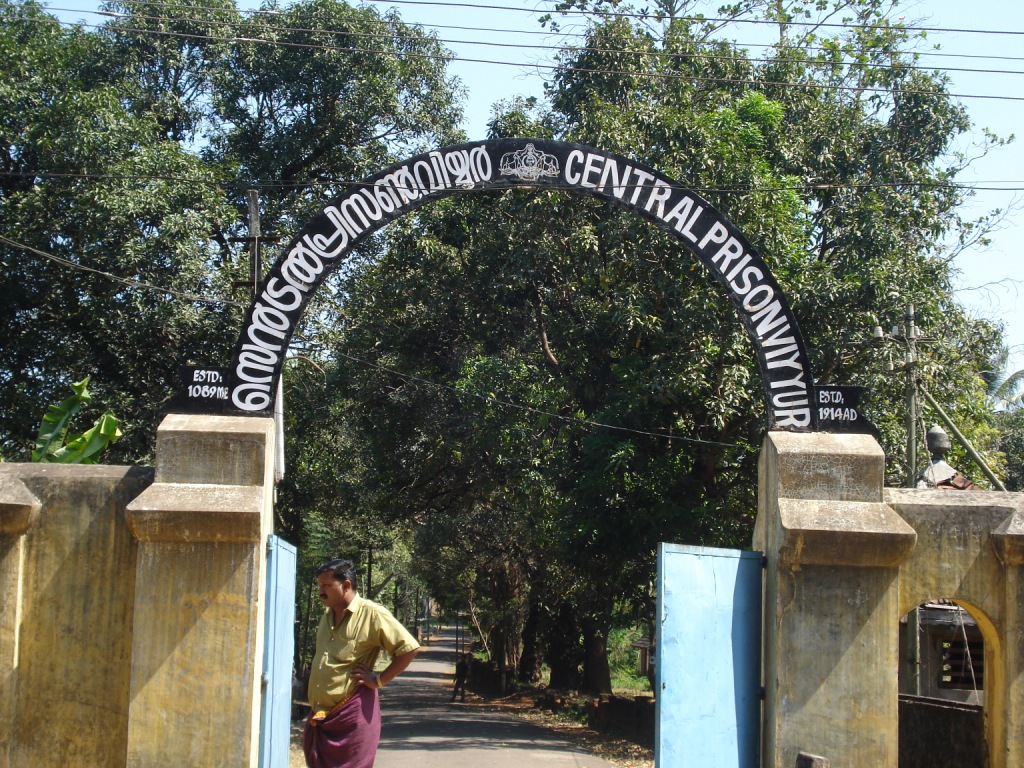
- Entrance of Central Prison, Viyyur
- Interactive map of Central Prison, Viyyur
- Location: Viyyur, Thrissur, India
- Status: Operational
- Security class: Central Prison
- Capacity: 520
- Population: 600 average
- Opened: 1914
- Managed by: Kerala Prisons and Correctional Services
- Director: Sri. K. Anilkumar
- Website: www.keralaprisons.gov.in/central-prison-viyyur.html

Central Prison & Correctional Home, Viyyur, is situated in Thrissur in Kerala state of India and is authorised to accommodate 520 prisoners. It is one of the four central prisons other than Poojappura, Kannur and Tavanur, situated in Kerala state. It is one of the most important correctional and detention centers in the state. As per Kerala Prison Rules, the prison is meant to detain convicted habitual prisoners on a long-term basis. The prison has separate buildings designated as special jail and sub-jail meant for short-term convicts and people on trial, respectively.

== History ==
Thrissur was the capital of the Kochi Kingdom for a long time hence the State Prison was located here. The original Thrissur Prison existed in front of Sri Vadakkumnathan Temple around 300 years ago. At the request of the prisoners, "Kudamattom" was conducted at the prison during the festival of Thrissur Pooram during the reign of H.H. Sakthan Thampuran, the Maharaja of Kochi.

In 1914 the temple authority requested to shift the prison and consequently it was demolished and shifted to Viyyur. Almost 1,000 acres of land from the property of H.H. Parukutty Nethyaramma Consort Queen of Kochi and Wife of Maharaja Rama Varma were handed over to establish the new prison at Viyyur. Later much of this original land went into use for other state purposes such as All-India Radio, Television, a police training facility, Fire Force center etc. After independence, the Government of Kerala, took over the facility and converted to a Central Prison intended to detain long term prisoners.

== Property ==
The prison originally had almost 1000 acres of land; however, several state establishments were subsequently established on its premises. This reduced the land available for exclusive use by the prison to 147 acres. Out of which, the Central Jail occupies a space of 17 acres. The remaining land is used for other prison facilities and buildings.

== Central Jail ==
The Central Jail is located in the center of the entire prison property, separated from the rest of the area via a circular perimeter wall almost 6 metres (20 ft) high, with a central watch tower at its center. There are six blocks for confining prisoners situated as the petals of a flower pointing towards the office block. Among the blocks A, B, C and D are made for cellular confinement having 44 cells each. F and E blocks are dormitory type having four compartments and the latter is used for female prisoners as a separate enclosure. Besides the prisoners blocks, there are separate buildings such as the kitchen, stores, manufactory section, library, hospital ward, prayer hall (consists of temple, church and mosque) and outside the prison the barrack hall, staff mess, staff canteen and cattle sheds etc. are situated.

The prison has a separate library building and a well stocked library which has around 10,000 books. Majority of the books, consisting of novels, history, short stories, life stories, etc, is in Malayalam language, as only a few prisoners understand English and other languages. Still there is a good collection of English, Hindi and Tamil novels too. The library is open from 9 am to 5 pm every day and also houses an open auditorium.

== Capacity ==
Kerala prison rules prescribe that every prisoner in a ward shall be allowed not less than 3.72 m^{2} of floor area and 17 m^{3} of breathing space. Accordingly, every cell of A, B, C and D blocks can accommodate two prisoners (measurement of a single cell 4.1 m × 2.3 m × 3.10 m (height) i.e. 9.43 m^{2} floor area and 12.53 m^{3} breathing space) and in F & E blocks (dormitories) 100 prisoners each. This means that in total 420 male prisoners and 100 female prisoners can be housed at Central Prison, Viyyur. The average prison population is around 630 male prisoners and 30 female prisoners. This reveals that male blocks are consistently overcrowded at around 50% over the authorised capacity.
