= Viyyoor =

- place
- Location in Kerala, India Viyyoor (India)
- Coordinates: 10°33′4″N 76°12′44″E
- Country: India
- State: Kerala
- District: Thrissur

Languages
  - Official: Malayalam, English
- Time zone: UTC+5:30 (IST)
- Vehicle registration: KL-08

Viyyoor is a residential area situated in the city of Thrissur in Kerala state of India. Viyyur is Ward 4 of Thrissur Municipal Corporation. It is dotted by a number of temples, churches, Mosques and is surrounded by lush greenery. It is about 4 km from Swaraj Round. It has one of the three central jails in Kerala, Viyyoor Central Jail, which opened its gates for public in July 2018.

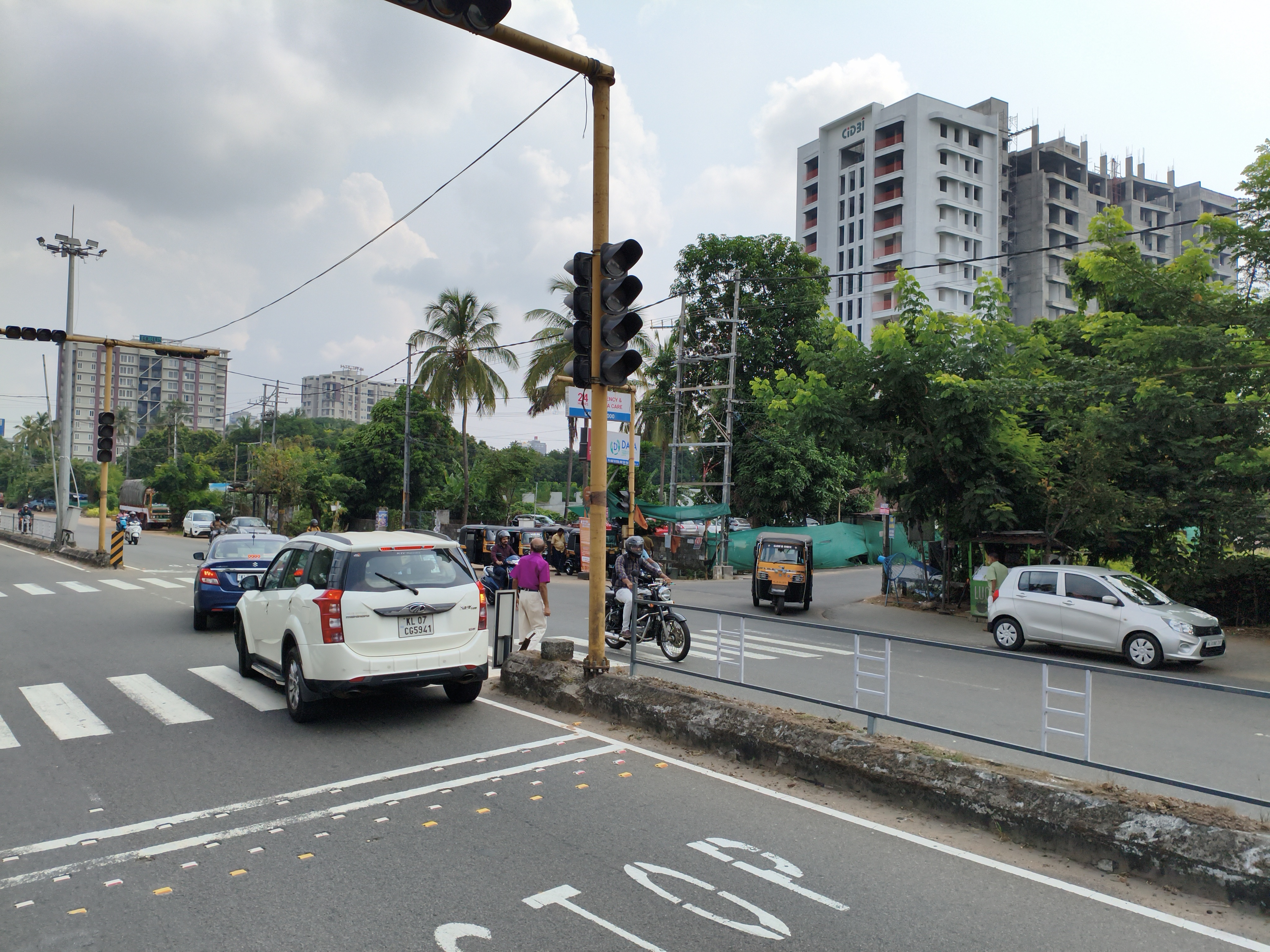
SH 22 at Viyyoor

== Institutions ==
- Viyyoor Central Jail
- Government Engineering College, Thrissur
- District Institute for Education and Training
- Hindi Training College
- Viyyur Grameena vayanasala
- St. Francis L.P. School
- 110 kV substation
- Viyyur Post Office

== Major places of worship ==
- Viyyoor Shiva Temple, which stands on the entrance of Viyyoor near the Viyyoor bridge.
- RC Church of Our Lady of Perpetual Help (Nithya Sahaya Matha Church).
- Viyyoor Manalarukavu devi temple, famous for the kavadi mahotsavam celebrated every year.

== See also ==
- Thrissur
- Thrissur District
- List of Thrissur Corporation wards
