= Kozhikode City Police =

Law enforcement agency of Kozhikode, Kerala

Kozhikode City Police കോഴിക്കോട് സിറ്റി പോലീസ്
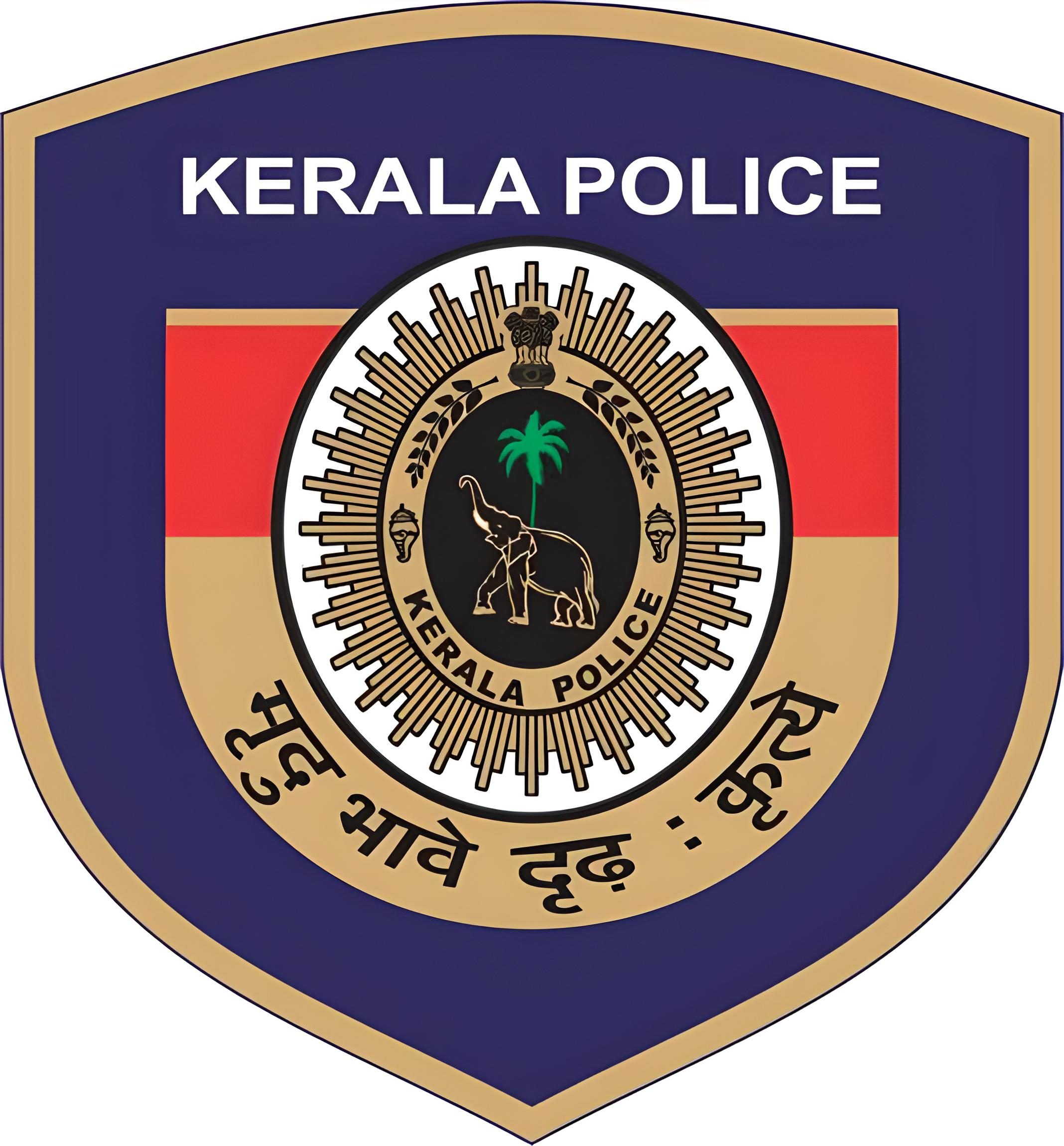
- Badge.
- Motto: Soft in Temperament, Yet Firm in Action

Jurisdictional structure
- Operations jurisdiction: Kozhikode, Kerala, India
- Area: 440.07 km^{2} (169.91 sq mi)
- Legal jurisdiction: Kozhikode Corporation, Feroke and Ramanattukara municipalities, Kadalundy, Olavanna, Thalakkulathur, Kakkodi, Kuruvattoor, Madavoor, Mavoor, Perumanna, Kunnamangalam, Chathamangalam and Peruvayal Panchayaths.
- Governing body: Home Department, Government of Kerala
- General nature: Local civilian police

Operational structure
- Minister responsible: Ramesh Chennithala, Minister for Home and Vigilance, Govt of Kerala
- Agency executives: AP Shoukathali I.P.S IPS, Commissioner of Police; Padam Singh IPS, Deputy Commissioner of Police (Law an Order & Traffic); Abdul Wahab, Additional Deputy Commissioner of Police (Admin)
- Parent agency: Kerala Police
- Units: List of units: Law and Order; Administration; City Special Branch; City Crime Branch; City Narcotics Cell; City Crime Records Bureau; City Armed Reserve (DHQ); Telecommunication; Control room; K9 Squad; Cyber Cell; Women Cell
- Sub-divisions: 5: Kozhikode Town; Medical College; Feroke; Traffic North; Traffic South

Facilities
- Stations: 20

Website
- https://kozhikodecity.keralapolice.gov.in

The Kozhikode City Police, a division of Kerala Police, is the police agency responsible for law enforcement and investigations within the City of Kozhikode, India and the surrounding area. The city police force is headed by a Commissioner of Police and the administrative control vests with the Home Department of Kerala. The present City Police Commissioner is Merin Joseph, an IPS officer.

The City Police Commissioner is an IPS officer holding the rank of Deputy Inspector General of Police (DIG) or Senior Superintendent of Police and is assisted by a Deputy Commissioner of Police. The Kozhikode City Police jurisdiction is divided into 3 sub-divisions and 2 traffic sub-divisions — Kozhikode Town, Medical College, Feroke, Traffic South and Traffic North. There are a total of 20 police stations, of which 16 are for primary law enforcement. One station is dedicated to women's police, two to coastal security, and one to cybercrime.

== Organization ==
The Kozhikode City Police is headed by a Commissioner of Police (CP). The Police Commissioner of Kozhikode is a senior IPS officer, and has the rank of Deputy inspector general of police (DIG) or Superintendent of Police (Selection Grade). The City Police Commissioner reports to the North Zone Inspector General of Police (IGP).

The Commissioner is assisted by a Deputy Commissioner of Police (DCP), an Additional Deputy Commissioner of Police (Addl.Dy.CP), and Assistant Commissioners of Police (ACPs).

There are also special units under Kozhikode City Police, including the District Crime Branch, District Special Branch, Police Control Room, Cyber Crime Police Station, Narcotics Cell, District Crime Records Bureau, and the District Headquarters Armed Reserve, each headed by an Assistant Commissioner of Police (ACP).

The Deputy Commissioner of Police (Law & Order and Traffic) supervises law and order maintenance and traffic policing in the city. For law and order purposes, the city is divided into three subdivisions—Medical College, Kozhikode Town, and Feroke—each headed by an Assistant Commissioner of Police (ACP). These subdivisions consists of 16 local police stations, along with one cybercrime police station and two coastal police stations (Beypore and Elathur) and one women's police station. Each police station is under Station House Officers (SHOs) in the rank of inspector or sub-inspector. The city also has two traffic subdivisions—North and South—each headed by an ACP, with dedicated Traffic Enforcement Units (TEUs) for traffic management and enforcement.

=== Police stations ===
- Beypore Coastal Police Station
- Beypore Police Station
- Chemmangad Police Station
- Chevayur Police Station
- Cyber Crime Police Station
- Elathur Coastal Police Station
- Elathur Police Station
- Feroke Police Station
- Kunnamangalam Police Station
- Kozhikode Kasaba Police Station
- Kozhikode Town Police Station
- Marad Police Station
- Mavoor Police Station
- Medical College Police Station
- Nadakkavu Police Station
- Nallalam Police Station
- Pantheerankavu Police Station
- Panniyankara Police Station
- Vanitha Police Station
- Vellayil Police Station

== Formation ==
In 1979, Kozhikode district was split into two police districts: Kozhikode City and Kozhikode Rural. The City Police Office began operating on June 1, 1979, in the current building. Kozhikode City Police District has been formed on 01/06/1979 bifurcating the Kozhikode Police District Vide GO (MS) No: 59/79 Home dated: 09/04/1979.

== Jurisdiction ==
Territorial jurisdiction consists entire area of:

- Kozhikode Municipal Corporation
- Feroke Municipality
- Ramanattukara Municipality
- Kadalundy, Olavanna, Thalakkulathur, Kakkodi, Kuruvattoor, Madavoor, Mavoor, Perumanna, Kunnamangalam, Chathamangalam and Peruvayal Gram Panchayaths.

== Special Units ==
- District Headquarters Camp (DHQ) - Armed Reserve Police Unit of the City Police, headed by a Deputy Commandant.
- District Special Branch (DSB) - Intelligence wing of the City Police, headed by an Assistant Commissioner.
- C-Branch (formerly known as Dist. Crime Branch) - Special crime Investigation wing of the City Police, headed by an Assistant Commissioner.
- District Crime Records Bureau (DCRB) - Maintains and analyses district crime and criminal data, headed by an Assistant Commissioner.
- Police Control Room - Coordinates police response and emergency communications, headed by an Assistant Commissioner.
- Narcotics Cell - Investigates and prevents drug-related offences, headed by an Assistant Commissioner.
  - DANSAF - Operational wing of the Narcotics Cell.
- City Traffic Police - Regulates traffic and enforces road safety laws in city limits, headed by two Assistant Commissioners.
  - Traffic Enforcement Units (TEU) - field level unit of the traffic police, headed by an Inspector of Police.
- Pink Police Patrol - Special patrol unit consisting of women officers, ensuring safety of women and children.
- Highway Police - Road safety enforcement unit in national and state highways.
- Coastal Police Stations - Responsible for coastal security, headed by an Inspector/SHO.
- Cyber Crime Police Station - Responsible for cyber crime investigation, headed by an Inspector/SHO.

== See also ==
- Kochi City Police
- Thiruvananthapuram City Police
- Kollam City Police
- Thrissur City Police
- Kannur City Police
- Kerala Police
