= Kuthuparamba firing =

Police incident in Kerala

The Kuthuparamba firing was a police action on 25 November 1994. The incident was named after the town Kuthuparamba in Kerala, India, and happened at Thalassery Road in Kannur, a district of Kerala.

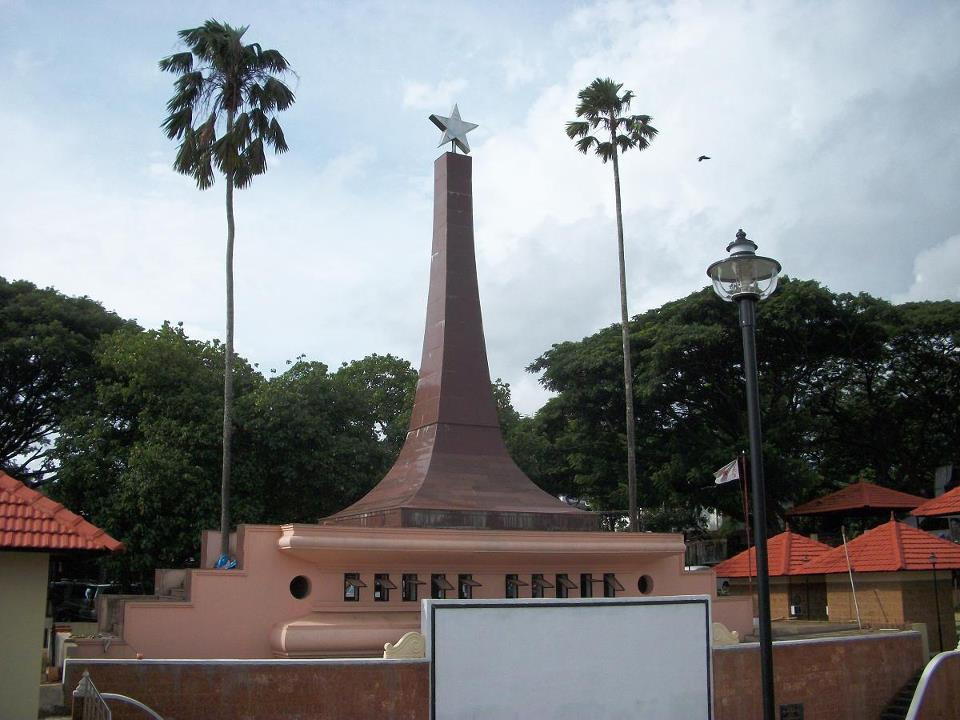
Kuthuparamba Martyr's memorial

The gunfire happened after the inauguration of the Co-operative Urban Bank's evening branch. The DYFI had organised a protest against the educational policy – granting government quota seats to the management – of the then UDF government led by the INC. Police fired their weapons when the protesters blocked minister M. V. Raghavan. The DYFI said their action was "a protest against Raghavan, CMP leader and Kerala’s Minister, for starting the medical college as a self-financing institution at Pariyaram, Kannur district, and "Granting government quota seats to the management."

The police stated that they fired at the crowd for both the protection of the minister as well as public and private property. Five DYFI activists were killed, and six people were injured. Following the firing, criminal proceedings were brought against people including the then Revenue Divisional Officer & Sub-Divisional Magistrate T.T Antony, DySP Abdul Hakkim Bathery, and constables P. K. Lukose, Sivadasan, and Balachandran. They were charged with murder, attempted murder and conspiracy by a magistrate court based on a private complaint.

The Kerala High Court quashed the murder charges in June 2012 against deputy collector T. T. Antony, IPS officer Ravada Chandrasekhar, and four other police officials connected with the firing. The court dismissed the case on the grounds that the necessary government permission to prosecute public officials had not been obtained in the case.

== Cause and the incident ==
Contrary to the advice given by the district administration, on 25 November 1994, Raghavan made plans to visit and attend the inauguration of the evening branch of the Co-operative Urban Bank, located in the Alakkandy Complex at Koothuparamba – Tellicherry Road, Kannur District.

Around 2000 DYFI workers were gathered to protest, the police used tear gas shells to disperse the protesters, when it failed the police began firing, which lasted for two hours. The first firing occurred in the proximity of the town hall, on the orders of the Executive Magistrate and the Deputy Superintendent of Police. Subsequent gunfire occurred in vicinity of Koothuparamba's police station on the orders of the Superintendent of Police. Five people were killed by gunfire, and six were injured.

After the firing, members of the police used their lathi to subdue the crowd. More than a hundred people—mostly protesters—were injured.

== Victims ==
The Koothuparamba firing resulted in the immediate death of five activists from the DYFI. The five people were K. K. Rajeevan, Madhu, Shibulal, Babu, and Roshan. Six more activists were injured at the hands of the police, Pushpan, who sustained severe injuries was bedridden for nearly three decades, and died in 2024.

The shooting was argued to be unprovoked by the Solicitor General. Since the protesters did not pose a threat to the life of the Minister, it was argued that the police over-reacted and the shooting was unnecessary.

To commemorate the 25th anniversary of the Kuthuparamba firing incident of 1994, DYFI organized commemorative programmes at Kuthuparamba on 25 November 2019. The event included a rally attended by around 50,000 people, inaugurated by CPI(M) leader Brinda Karat, and the inauguration of the Kuthuparamba Martyrs Memorial Hall.

== Case proceedings ==
After the two firings, first information reports (FIRs) were lodged on the day of the incident, and an Inquiry Commission report was sent to the Government. The government accepted the report on 30 June 1997 and directions for taking legal actions against the accused were given. Within two days, the Director General of Police (DGP) sent instructions to the Inspector General of Police (North Zone) to file a case and have it investigated by a senior officer. The Inspector General of Police (IG) said that "firing without justifications by which people were killed amounted to murder." He later told the Station House Officer to register file a case and send a copy of the FIR to the Deputy Superintendent of Police. An interim report was filed by the DIG of Police on 29 September 1998 in the court of Judicial First Class Magistrate.

Subsequently, there were a long series of legal arguments, and a fresh investigation took place—this time by the Kerala State Police rather than the C.B.I. The murder charges against Revenue Divisional Officer & Sub-Divisional Magistrate T T Antony and IPS officer Ravada Chandrasekhar and four police officers were quashed by Kerala High Court in 2012.

== See also ==
- List of cases of police brutality in India
