= Merin Joseph =

Indian police officer

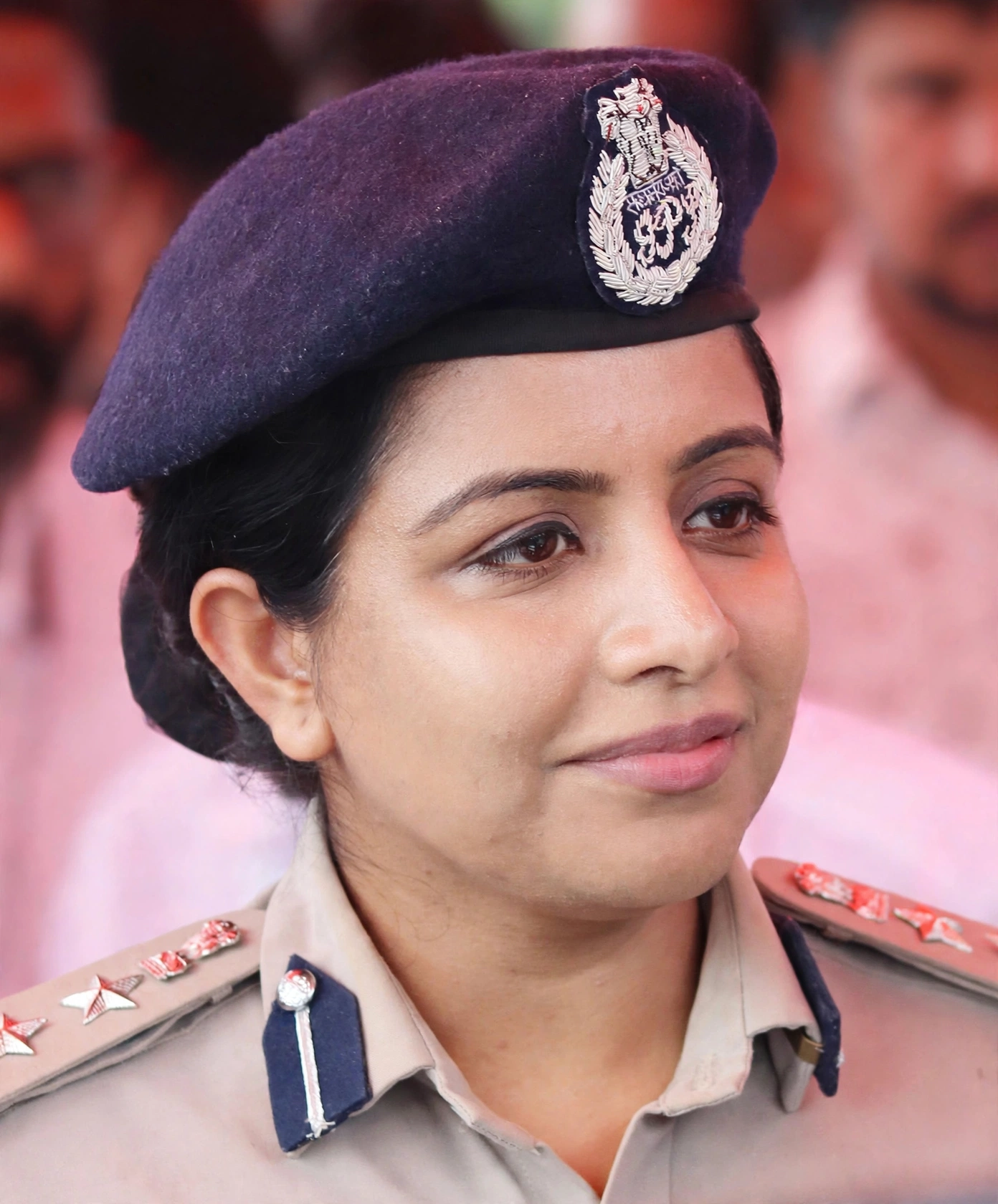
- Merin in 2026
- Born: 20 April 1990 (age 36); Trivandrum, Kerala, India
- Education: Delhi University, National Police Academy, Hyderabad
- Occupations: Police officer, Civil servant
- Spouse: Chris Abraham

Police career
- Department: Kerala Police
- Service: Indian Police Service
- Cadre and batch: Kerala, 2013 RR
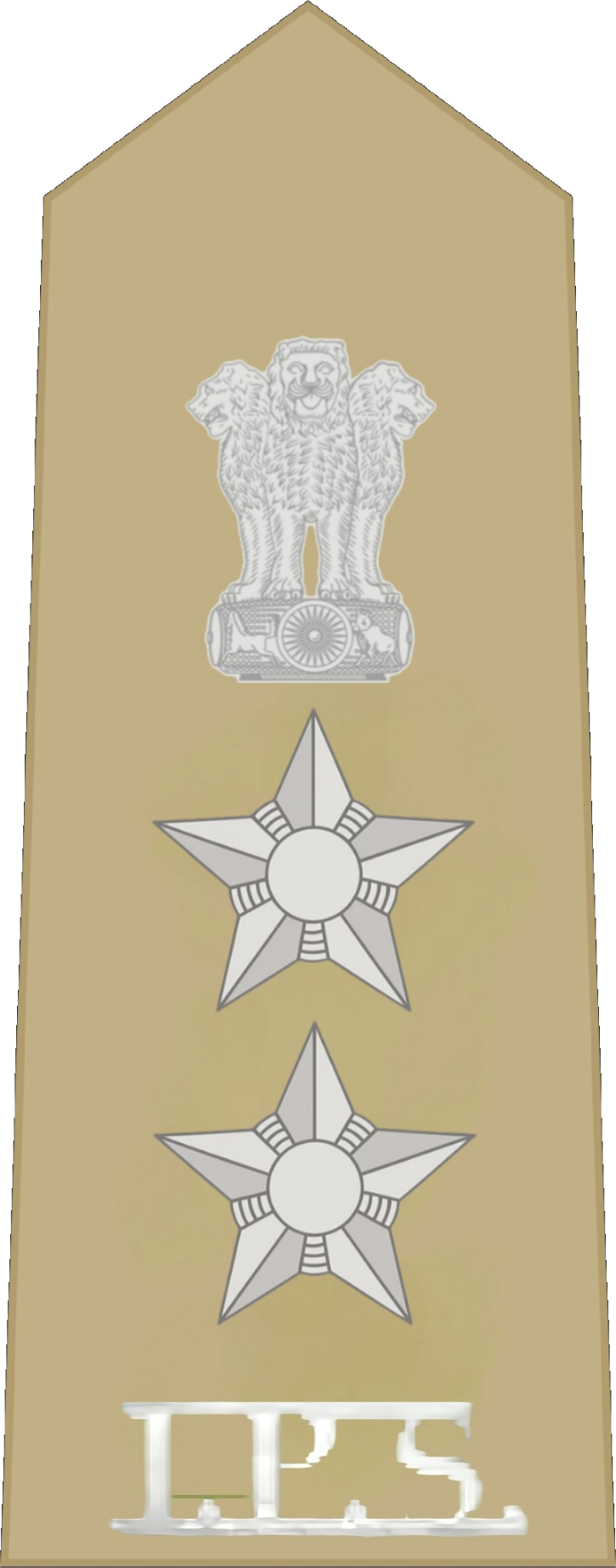
- Rank: Superintendent of Police (Selection Grade)

Merin Joseph (born 20 April 1990) is an Indian Police Service (IPS) officer of the 2012 batch, known for her professionalism and outspoken views on gender equality. She came into public prominence both for her work in criminal investigations and for challenging sexist portrayals of women officers in Indian media.

== Personal life ==
She married Chris Abraham on 5 February 2015.

== Police career ==
She is a 2013-batch Indian Police Service (IPS) officer of the Kerala cadre. She served as an Assistant Superintendent of Police (Under Training) in the Ernakulam Rural Police District. She began her career as Assistant Superintendent of Police (ASP) of the Munnar subdivision.

- District Police Chief (DPC) of the Kozhikode Rural, Kozhikode City, Kollam City Police Districts.
- Superintendent of Police (SP) of the Police Headquarters, Crime Branch Headquarters.
- Deputy Commissioner of Police, Kozhikode City Police.
- Superintendent of Police, Railways (Kerala Railway Police).
- Commandant, Kerala Armed Police Battalion II, Palakkad.
- Assistant Superintendent of Police, Irinjalakuda Subdivision, Thrissur Rural.
- Assistant Superintendent of Police, Munnar Subdivision, Idukki.

== Controversies ==
In 2016, Merin Joseph criticised a newspaper article that ranked women IAS and IPS officers based on their appearance, calling it objectifying and misogynistic.
