= Sheikh Darvesh Saheb =

Former State Police Chief of Kerala

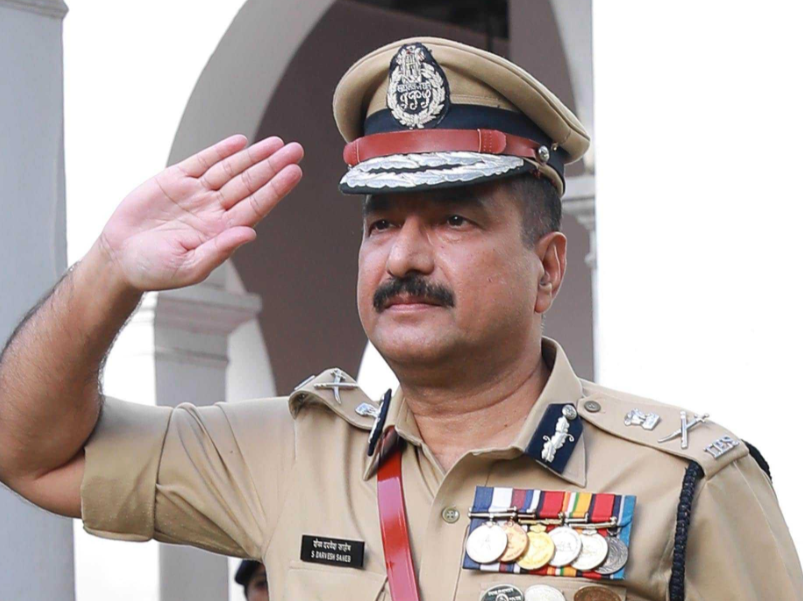
- Sheikh Davesh Saheb IPS Shaikh Darvesh Saheb

State Police Chief of Kerala
- In office 27 June 2023 – 30 June 2025
- Preceded by: Anil Kant
- Succeeded by: Ravada A. Chandrasekhar

Director General of Prisons and Correctional Services, Kerala
- In office 2 August 2021 – 26 April 2022

Personal details
- Born: Hyderabad, Telangana
- Children: 2
- Education: Sardar Vallabhbhai Patel National Police Academy
- Occupation: Police officer
- Police career
- Department: Kerala Police
- Service years: 1990–2025
- Status: Retired.
- Rank: Director General of Police
- Batch: 1990
- Cadre: Indian Police Service (Kerala Cadre)
- Awards: President's Police Medal for Distinguished Service President's Police Medal Ati Utkrishta Seva Pathak

Shaik Darvesh Saheb is a retired Indian Police Service (IPS) officer who served as the State Police Chief and Director General of Police (DGP) of Kerala. He assumed charge on 27 June 2023, succeeding Anil Kant, and completed his extended tenure in 2024.

== Background and education ==
Darvesh Saheb is a native of Kadapa, district in Andhra Pardesh. He holds a Masters in Agriculture, a Doctorate in Agronomy and an MBA in Finance.

== Personal life ==
Darvesh Saheb is married to Sheikh Farida Fatima. The couple has a son and a daughter.

== Career ==
Darvesh Saheb is 1990 Batch IPS officer. He started his career as an Assistant Superintendent of Police(ASP) of Nedumangad. He later worked as Superintendent of police in various districts including Wayanad, Kasaragod, Kannur, and Palakkad. Later he served as Superintendent of police in Railways and State Special Branch.He also served as Commandant in Malabar Special Police (MSP) and Kerala Armed Police Battalions (KAP) 2nd Battalion.

Darvesh Sahib served as Governor's Aide-De-Camp (ADC) and was part of United Nations Interim Administration Mission in Kosovo. He also served as Kochi City Police Commissioner in SP rank. He was assistant director and deputy director at Sardar Vallabhbhai Patel National Police Academy in Hyderbad. He also worked as Additional Excise Commissioner and Director of Kerala Police Academy. He was the first Additional Director General of Police (Law and Order) of the state when the Kerala Police underwent a structural change, with the entire law and order charge of the state under a single command.

Darvesh Saheb was appointed Director General of Police and State Police Chief of Kerala on 27 June 2023. His appointment to post was followed the retirement of former state police chief Anil Kant.

During his tenure as state police chief, the Kerala Police saw several notable initiatives. In early 2024, he oversaw the formation of the Cyber Division, bringing together scattered units like Cyber Patrol, Cyber Crime Investigation, and Cyber Dome under a single command. His tenure also witnessed the launch of “Operation D-Hunt”, one of the state's most comprehensive crackdowns on illicit drug trafficking. Darvesh Sahib saw cyber crimes, financial fraud, and narcotics as the major policing challenges Kerala faces in the coming years, has urged the force to continue prioritising these threats.

He further emphasised upon citizen-centric policing, and directed officers to ensure courteous treatment of complainants. He also played role in streamlining police-station grievance handling. His tenure also witnessed several administrative reforms, increased coordination with district police chiefs, and public-safety initiatives.

In June 2024, the Government of Kerala decided to extend his tenure by one year. He retired from service after completing the extended term on 26 June 2025.

== Awards ==
Darvesh Saheb was awarded the President's Police Medal for meritorious services in 2016 and also received Indian Police Medal in 2018. He also received the United Nations Medal for peacekeeping missions in Kosovo.

== Appointments ==
- Tenure extended by one year – June 2024.
- Director General of Police & State Police Chief, Kerala – 30 June 2023.
- Director General of Kerala Fire and Rescue Services, Civil defence, and Homeguards.
- Director of Kerala Police Academy.
- Director General of Kerala Prisons and Correctional Services
- Additional Director General of Police, Law and Order
- Additional Director General of Police, Police Headquarters
- Additional Director General of Police, Vigilance
- Additional Director General of Police, Crime Branch
- Additional Director General of Police, North Zone (L&O)
- Inspector General of Police, Special Branch-CID
- Additional Excise Commissioner, Kerala (IGP)
- City Police Commissioner of Kochi (SP)
- Superintendent of Police (SP) of the districts of Wayanad, Palakkad, Kasaragod and Kannur.
- Commandant of the battalions; Malabar Special Police (MSP), Kerala Armed Police II (KAP II)
- Assistant Superintendent of Police, Nedumangad Sub-division (ASP)

== See also ==
- Kerala Police
- Indian Police Service
