= Jacob Punnoose =

Indian police chief

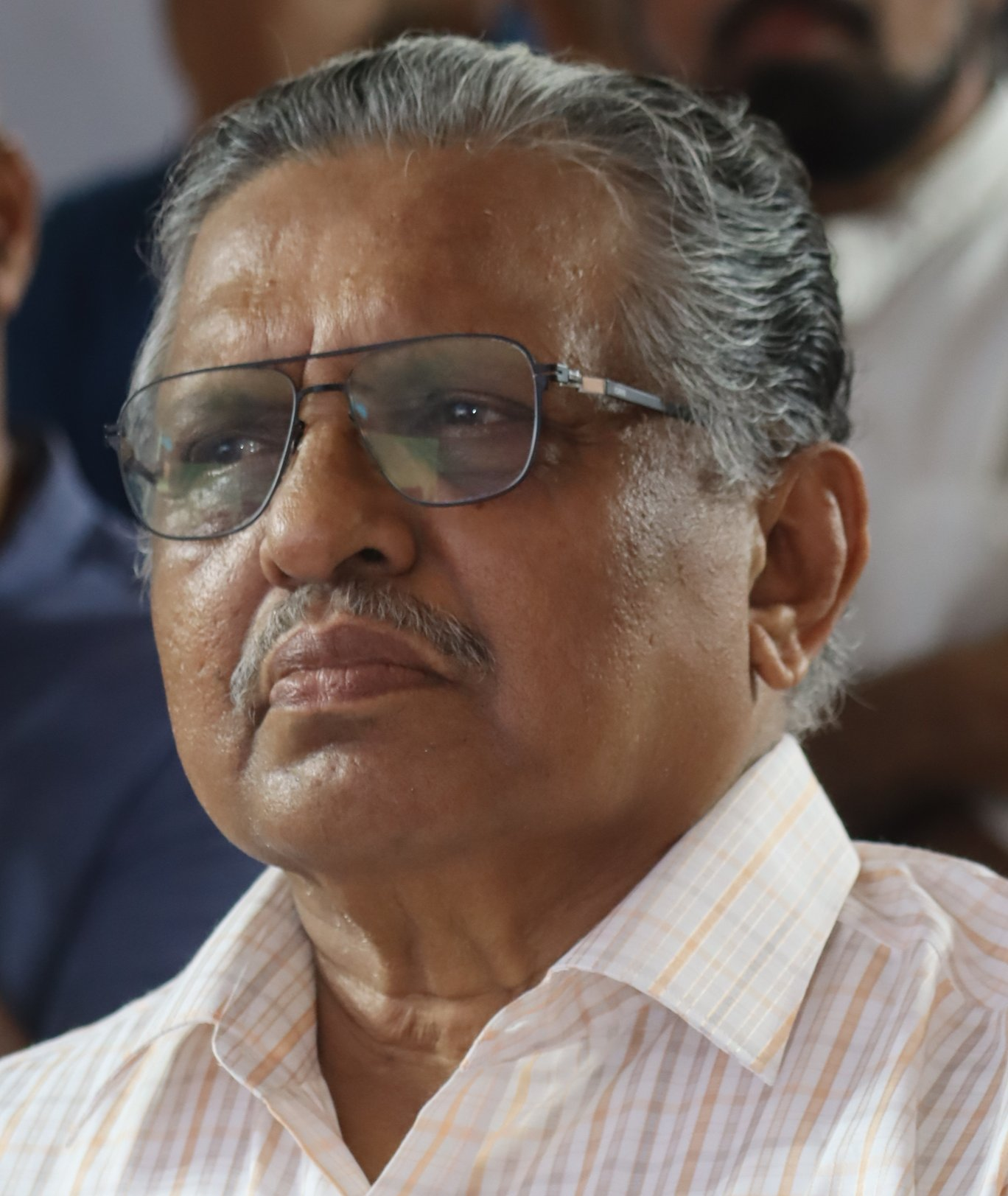

State Police Chief of Kerala
- In office 1 December 2008 – 31 August 2012
- Preceded by: Raman Srivastava
- Succeeded by: K. S. Balasubramanian

Personal details
- Spouse: Rebecca
- Children: 2
- Education: University College, Thiruvananthapuram; Cochin University
- Occupation: Police officer
- Police career
- Department: Kerala Police
- Service years: 1975–2012
- Status: Retired
- Rank: Director General of Police
- Batch: 1975
- Cadre: Indian Police Service (Kerala Cadre)

Jacob Punnoose was the Director General of Police (DGP) of Kerala and the State Police Chief. He retired on 31 August 2012 after serving more than 35 years in the Indian Police Service and in the Kerala Police. He was succeeded by Sri K.S. Balasubramanian IPS as the State Police Chief on 1 September 2012.

On 31 January 2018 he became Executive Director of Pushpagiri Medical College. He is Secretary of the Pastoral Council in the Major Archieparchy of Trivandrum (Thiruvananthapuram).

== Education ==
He had his education in Government U.P.S. Thekkekkara (Mavelikara), P.C. High School (Ranni), S.C. High School (Ranni), St. Xavier's College, Thumba (Thiruvananthapuram), University College (Thiruvananthapuram), and Cochin University.

== Career ==
He became the City Police Commissioner of Thiruvananthapuram and Kozhikode, Joint Excise Commissioner, Zonal IG of Thiruvananthapuram and Kozhikode, Intelligence IG, Additional DGP (Training) and Intelligence DGP. He was the Vigilance Director. He was the chairman of the Kerala Police Act Review Committee. He was appointed DGP of law and order in Kerala on 26 November 2008. He was a member of the 1975 IPS Batch.

== Personal life ==
He belongs to the Kurudamannil family. Rebecca is his wife. The couple has two children.
