= Hi-Tech Crime Enquiry Cell =

Unit of Kerala police in India

- ഹൈ ടെക് ക്രൈം എൻക്വയറി സെൽ
- Agency: Kerala Police
- Type: cyber police
- Role: Investigation of Cyber crimes, Crimes related to internet, computer, technology.
- Operations jurisdiction: State
- Headquarters: Thiruvananthapuram

Structure
- Cyber Crime PS: 20

Commanders
- Current commander: TBC

The Hi-Tech Crime Enquiry Cell is a special unit of the Kerala Police in Kerala, India, which began operations on 5 May 2006. It was formed to prevent, detect and defend against organized cybercrime.

The unit is organized for the purpose to prevent, investigate, and prosecute computer and related crimes by working with other government agencies, the private sector, academic institutions, and foreign counterparts.
