= Kochi City Police =

Police force of Indian city, Kochi

Kochi City Police Ernakulam City Police
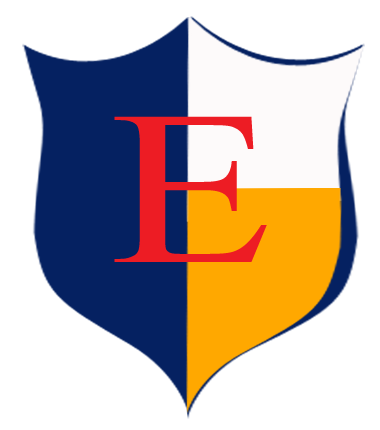
- logo of kochi city police

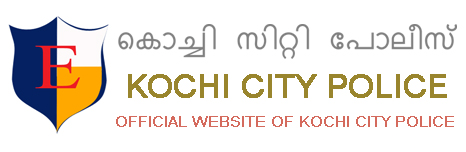

- The official flag of Kerala Police.
- Abbreviation: KCPD
- Motto: Mridu Bhave Dhrida Kruthye; Soft Temperament, Firm Action

Agency overview
- Formed: 1966
- Preceding agency: Cochin State Royal Police

Jurisdictional structure
- Operations jurisdiction: Kochi, India
- General nature: Local civilian police

Operational structure
- Overseen by: Home Department, Government of Kerala
- Headquarters: Police Commissionerate of Kochi, Ernakulam
- Minister responsible: Ramesh Chennithala, Minister for Home and Vigilance, Government of Kerala
- Agency executives: R.Nishantini IPS, IGP & Commissioner of Police; Aswathy Jiji IPS, Deputy Commissioner of Police (L&O, Traffic); Shahansha K S IPS, Deputy Commissioner of Police (L&O II); Vinod Pillai KPS, Deputy Commissioner of Police (Admin & Crimes)
- Parent agency: Kerala Police
- Special Units: List: C-Branch; City Special Branch; Command and Control Center; City Armed Reserve; Pink Patrol; Highway Police; Traffic Enforcement; Narcotic Cell; Women Cell; K9 Squad; District Crime Records Bureau; Telecommunication; Cyber Cell
- Sub-divisions: 4: Ernakulam; Ernakulam Central; Mattanchery; Thrikkakara

Facilities
- Police Stations: 28 (23 L&O PS; 1 Cyber Crime PS; 1 Coastal PS; 1 Tourism PS; 1 Metro PS 1 Women's PS)
- Sniffer Dogs (Bomb and Narcotics)s: 5

Website
- https://www.kochicity.keralapolice.gov.in

Kochi City Police (KCP), also known as the Ernakulam City Police, is the police agency of the Indian city of Kochi. The force is headed by a Police Commissioner, an IPS officer. The city police was reorganized as Metro Police force, on 1 April 1966, after forming City Corporation of Kochi.

== History ==
In 1947, the Cochin State Royal Police was merged with Royal Travancore Police to form Travancore-Kochi State Police. After formation of Kerala, this force became part of Kerala Police. That time, the Kochi city had 3 police departments, namely Fort Kochi Police, Mattancherry Police and Ernakulam City Police. In 1960 when 3 municipalities was merged to form Kochi City Corporation, the force too was renamed as Kochi City Police.

== Organization ==
=== Office of the Commissioner of Police, Kochi City ===
The Kochi City Police is headed by a Commissioner of Police (CP), officially designated as the District Police Chief, Kochi City. The CP is an Indian Police Service (IPS) officer, typically holding the rank of Inspector General of Police (IGP) or Deputy Inspector General of Police (DIG). The Commissioner is assisted by Deputy Commissioners of Police (DCPs), with the rank of Superintendent of Police (SP). Each DCP is in charge of a specific area of responsibility: Law and Order & Traffic, Administration & Crimes. The Commissioner reports to the ADGP (law & order) of the state.

The incumbent Kochi City Police Commissioner is Kaliraj Mahesh Kumar, IPS.

=== Law and Order ===
“There are two Deputy Commissioners of Police (DCPs) responsible for law and order supervision. The DCP (L&O and Traffic) is assisted by 6 Assistant Commissioners (ACPs), four for sub-divisions and two for traffic management. The city is divided into 4 sub-divisions, each headed by an Assistant Commissioner (ACPs). The Assistant Commissioners incharge of sub-divisions supervise police stations and units under them. The city has 27 police stations, each led by an Inspector of Police (IP) designated as Station House Officer. The city has also a Cyber Crime Police Station.

=== Administration & Crimes ===
A Deputy Commissioner of Police (DCP) oversees the administration and special units of the city police. The DCP (Admin & Crimes) serves as the staff officer to the Commissioner of Police and is responsible for the day-to-day operations of the City Police Office. The DCP supervises the functioning of the C Branch (District Crime Branch), District Special Branch, District Crime Records Bureau, and Narcotics Cell, Police Control Room, each headed by an Assistant Commissioner of Police.

=== Kochi City Traffic Police ===
The Kochi City Traffic Police is responsible for traffic management and enforcement in the city. For operational purposes, the traffic wing is divided into two sub-divisions: Traffic West and Traffic East, each headed by an Assistant Commissioner of Police (ACP). Each sub-division consists of Traffic Enforcement Units (Traffic Police Stations), which are headed by Inspectors of Police.

The DCP (L&O Traffic) supervise its activities.

=== District Head Quarter (DHQ) Camp ===
“The District Headquarters, Kochi City (DHQ), is the Armed Reserve Police unit of the City Police. The DHQ provides armed personnel to assist the local police in maintaining law and order, managing public events, riot control, disaster response, and VIP security. It is headed by a Commandant, an officer of the rank of Superintendent of Police (SP).

== Hierarchy ==
The Commissioner of Police reports to the State Police Chief via ADGP, Law and Order.

Officers:

- Commissioner of Police (CP)
  (holds the rank of IGP)
- Additional Commissioner of Police (Addl.CP)
  (holds the rank of DIG)
- Deputy Commissioner of Police (DCP)
  (holds the rank of SP)
- Assistant Commissioner of Police (ACP)
  (holds the rank of DYSP or ASP)

Subordinates:

- Inspector of Police (IP)
- Sub-Inspector of Police (SI)
- Assistant Sub Inspector of Police (ASI)
- Senior Civil Police Officer (Sr.CPO)
- Civil Police Officer (CPO)

Kochi City Police Structure, Insignia, and Equivalent Ranks
Post/Designation	Abbreviation	Insignia	Equivalent IPS/State Police Rank	Description
Commissioner of Police	CP		IGP or DIG	Head of the city police force
Additional Commissioner of Police	Addl.CP		DIG	Assist the City Police Commissioner on various tasks. The post is currently vacant.
Deputy Commissioner of Police	DCP		SP	In charge of Law & Order and Traffic, Crimes, Administration, Security, etc.
Assistant Commissioner of Police	ACP		ASP / DySP	Heads a police sub-division or special unit;

== Divisions ==
=== Control Room- 112 ===
The Central Control Room is the major coordinating center that co-ordinates the entire movements of police force for the city. Public can reach the control room, by making distress toll-free call 112 in any telephonic device. The Control room maintains 12 Flying Squads, also known as Control Room Vehicles (CRVs) (High Fast Patrol Team), in major points of the city and upon distress call, the control room identifies the location of call and directs the nearest CRV squad rush to the spot. The Kochi city Police monitoring the pulses of the city through ITMS system (Intelligent Traffic Management System) effectively.

=== Anti-Narcotics Squad (ANS) ===
The District Anti Narcotic Special Action Force is functioning under an Assistant Commissioner of Police (Narcotic Cell) that checks use and trafficking of narcotics and banned psychotropic drugs. Currently the cell operates at Narcotic Cell, Commissioner Office, Kochi City and has DANSAF (District Anti-Narcotic Special Action Force) team as Operational wing.

=== Vanitha Station (Women's Police Station) ===
For the protection and assistance of single women and children, a women police station functions with women police officers led by an Inspector of Police. A medical counselor functions in the station, to solve family disputes and provide counselling facilities to needy. The station also handles crimes that involve ladies and juveniles' offenders. Currently the station is located at Police Quarters near High Court of Kerala.

=== Special Branch (SB) ===
This forms an intelligence unit for Kochi City Police force, where information gathered at all corners is collected, analyzed and recorded to regular use. The SB has various methods to gather information and employs Mafti (Under-cover) force for information. The Special Branch is headed by an Assistant Commissioner of Police, assisted by police officers of various ranks.

=== C-Branch (Dist. Crime Branch) ===
The C-Branch, formerly known as Crime Detachment acts as specialized investigating unit of city police commissioner which is mandated to help in investigating sensational cases at the city. This unit is specialised in crime investigation and also investigate cases that are entrusted to it by the commissioner. it's headed by an assistant commissioner of police.

=== District Head Quarters Camp ===
Kochi Police maintains 2 units of District Head Quarters (Armed Reserve Camp). The District Head Quarters Kochi Police is located at Thrippunithura and Marine Drive. 3 Companies each are maintained in DHQ-Thrippunithura and DHQ-Marine Drive.

In addition, 3 major squads are maintained at District Head Quarters.

The Kochi City DHQ is under command of a Commandant, and assisted by deputy/assistant commandants.

TEAR GAS SQUAD: A Tear Gas Squad is functioning at DHQ Kochi City to deal with emergency situations.

BOMB SQUAD: The trained Bomb Squad unit is functioning under Kochi City Police.

DOG SQUAD: Dog Squad Units of District Head Quarters, Ernakulam and Thrippunithura are functioning under the charge of one SI. 5 Sniffer Dogs and 3 Tracker Dogs are available in this Squad.

=== City Traffic Police ===
Kochi City Traffic Police, is a semi-autonomous body with 2 Assistant Commissioners taking the lead. There are 2 divisions, the Regulatory Office located near Central Police Station(Traffic West) and second at Edappally (Traffic East).

Traffic management is handled mainly through two Traffic Enforcement Units (TEUs) headed by Inspectors of Police: Traffic Enforcement Unit (West) at Kacherippadi near the High Court, and Traffic Enforcement Unit (East) at Edappally. Additionally, there are traffic wings functioning at Thripunithura and Mattanchery to manage traffic regulation and enforcement in their respective areas.

== List of Police Stations ==
Sn	PS	Sub division
1	Ambalamedu Police Station	Thrikkakara SDPO
2	Eloor Police Station	Thrikkakara SDPO
3	Hill Palace Police Station,	Thrikkakara SDPO
4	Infopark Police Station	Thrikkakara SDPO
5	Kalamassery Police Station	Thrikkakara SDPO
6	Udayamperoor Police Station	Thrikkakara SDPO
7	Thrikkakara Police Station	Thrikkakara SDPO
8	Ernakulam Central Police Station	Ernakulam Central SDPO
9	Kadavanthra PS	Ernakulam Central SDPO
10	Mulavukad PS	Ernakulam Central SDPO
11	Vanitha Police station	Ernakulam Central SDPO
12	Ernakulam Town North PS	Ernakulam Central SDPO
13	Palarivattom PS	Ernakulam Central SDPO
14	Cheranelloor PS	Ernakulam Central SDPO
15	Harbour PS	Ernakulam SDPO
16	Ernakulam Town South PS	Ernakulam SDPO
17	Panangadu PS	Ernakulam SDPO
18	Maradu PS	Ernakulam SDPO
19	Palarivattom PS	Ernakulam SDPO
20	Kochi Metro PS	Ernakulam SDPO
21	Fort Kochi PS	Mattanchery SDPO
22	Mattanchery PS	Mattanchery SDPO
23	Kannamaly PS	Mattanchery SDPO
24	Tourism PS	Mattanchery SDPO
25	Palluruthy PS	Mattanchery SDPO
26	Thoppumpady PS	Mattanchery SDPO
27	Coastal PS, Fort Kochi	Mattanchery SDPO
28	Cyber Crime Police Station	District Crime Records Bureau, Kochi City

== Initiatives ==
=== i Suraksha Project ===
The Assistant Commissioner (Narcotic Cell) is the district Nodal officer of Janamythri Suraksha Project.Being the District Nodal officer of the Janamythri Suraksha Project, coordinate all the activities of Janamythri including supervision of Janamythri M Beat, collection of intelligence by Janamythri Beat officers, Janamythri Samithi meeting, Residence Association meeting and also conduct weekly review of Janamythri Beat officers performance. During the year 2021 Janamythri beat officers' conduct 34,078 nos of house visit. Various other programmes conducted by Beat officers are – 1) As per the instructions from JMSP Directorate Beat officers are deputed for Covid -19 enforcement duties. 2) Udayamperoor police provided Notebooks and other educational material aids to school students those who are suffering financial crisis. 3) 3 Mobile Phones are provided to selected students by Fort Kochi Police. 4) An auto taxi started at Harbour PS limit for the transportation of Covid patients with the co-operation of residents association. 5) Besides these all-police stations are provided food kit to wandering people during lock down days.

==== Women self defence programme ====
The women self-defence teams in all districts have been reconstituted vide Executive Directive No. 03/2022 /PHQ Dtd 27.02.2022. As per Order No. 15/SPMC/PHQ/2022 Dtd 22.02.2022, ACP Narcotic Cell who in charge of Janamythri Police will be the Nodal officer of Women self defence programme. Some of the Police officers of Kochi city are detailed for giving self-defense training to the women and college students.

==== Student Police Cadet Project, Kochi City ====
Student Police Cadet Project is a farsighted school based initiative, aims to complement the education system through strengthening values, behavior and attributes of the youth through a two years program of training and personality development, which enables students to evolve as responsible and capable citizens of a democratic society by inculcating in them respect for the law, inner capability, self discipline, civic sense, empathy towards vulnerable sections of society and resistance to social evils.

The SPC training program comprises various modules meant to facilitate each cadet with learning inputs to acquire desired capabilities of future citizens through a regular two year course of physical fitness training, parade training, indoor classes, workshops on law and citizenship, field visits to Government institutions and Judicial offices of Law enforcement, Mini Projects and leadership camps.

==== Kadalora Jagratha Samithies ====
In Kochi City Kadalora Jagratha Samithies have constituted for the safety of people in coastal areas. ACP Mattanchery has monitored the meetings and time to time actions regarding the coastal area issues. Various activities were organized under the state plan scheme for the financial year 2018- 2019.

==== Child Friendly Police Stations ====
Ten police stations, Fort kochi, Palluruthy, THoppumpady, Central, ET North, Kadavanthra, ET South, Vanitha, Cyber, Infopark etc. have child friendly facilities in Kochi city. In the pandemic situations online program and counseling were conducted for refreshing the students. Child suicide details have been collected from police stations and women cell officials visited affected houses for console and provide moral support to the family members. Instructions were given to the child friendly police stations for collect the details of drop out students, and make arrangements to continue their further study. District CAP center started at Central Police Station for the co-ordination of the project in Kochi City.

==== Koottu ====
Kerala Police's cyberdome has launched a new project for sexually exploited children in association with organization Bachpan Bachao Andolan. The project named "Koottu" works as a handout for child survivors of cyber crime and other sexual exploitation. This project also aims to provide pre-trial counseling to children who have been subjected to sexual violence. The T project helps children survive sexual abuse and face trial with confidence. Along with this, the scheme provides psychological and social support to the children and their families. For this, ensuring the child's academic progress, ensuring the social rehabilitation of the child, and various resources from the government for the deceased. This completely free program is run by trained mental health professionals and the police. The scheme aims to ensure the most suitable rehabilitation of the surviving children and their families without infringing their rights in any way while giving utmost importance to their privacy.

== List of City Police Commissioners ==
Ref:

No.	Name	Rank	From	To
1	S. Chandrasekharan	SP	01/04/1966	12/05/1967
2	P. Chokalingam	SP	12/05/1967	17/07/1967
3	P. Vijayan	SP	17/07/1967	08/01/1970
4	P. R. Chandran	SP	08/01/1970	16/02/1970
5	G. Gopinatha Pillai	SP	16/02/1970	08/12/1970
6	G. G. John	SP	08/12/1970	28/03/1971
7	K. Chandrasekharan Nair	SP	29/03/1971	10/06/1974
8	C. A. Chaly	SP	10/06/1974	23/05/1977
9	V. Joseph Thomas	SP	23/05/1977	02/04/1979
10	P. R. Chandran	SP	10/04/1979	25/02/1980
11	A. V. Subba Rao	SP	25/02/1980	26/05/1981
12	R. S. Moosha Hari	SP	26/05/1981	31/03/1982
13	C. T. Antony	SP	31/03/1982	21/08/1984
14	Sibi Mathews	SP	21/08/1984	06/04/1988
15	K. P. Somarajan	SP	13/04/1988	10/01/1990
16	Alexander Jacob	SP	15/01/1990	11/06/1990
17	M. J. Jacob	SP	11/06/1990	31/12/1990
18	M. C. Geevarghese	SP	04/01/1991	16/07/1991
19	Loknath Behera	SP	16/07/1991	30/06/1995
20	T. P. Senkumar	SP	01/07/1995	12/08/1996
21	Rishi Raj Singh	SP	13/08/1996	18/07/1997
22	Dr. Jacob Thomas	SP	18/07/1997	02/04/1998
23	B. S. Muhammed Yaasin	SP	27/04/1998	06/03/2000
24	Arun Kumar Sinha	SP	22/04/2000	04/03/2001
25	Anil Kant	SP	04/03/2001	16/06/2001
26	Rawada. A. Chandrasekhar	SP	16/06/2001	10/11/2001
27	Y. Anilkumar	SP	10/11/2001	20/04/2002
28	Dr. Sheik Darvash Saheb	SP	22/04/2002	10/07/2002
29	Vinod Thomas	SP	10/07/2002	05/07/2004
30	Dinendra Kashyap	SP	05/07/2004	19/08/2005
31	P. Vijayan	SP	19/08/2005	01/03/2007
32	Manoj Abraham	SP	01/03/2007	26/02/2008
33	Manoj Abraham	DIG	26/02/2008	26/02/2011
34	M. R. Ajith Kumar	DIG	03/03/2011	01/01/2013
35	K. G. James	DIG	02/01/2013	31/08/2015
36	Hari Sankar (I/C)	DIG	31/08/2015	02/09/2015
37	M. P. Dinesh	DIG	02/09/2015	05/09/2019
38	Dr. J. Himendranath (I/C)	DIG	05/02/2019	12/02/2019
39	K. P. Philip (I/C)	DIG	12/02/2019	08/03/2019
40	S. Surendran	DIG	08/03/2019	13/06/2019
41	Vijay Sakhare	IGP	13/06/2019	01/01/2021
42	Nagaraju Chakilam	IGP	01/01/2021	31/12/2022
43	K. Sethu Raman	IGP	01/01/2023	10/08/2023
44	A. Akbar	IGP	10/08/2023	30/01/2024
45	Putta Vimaladitya	DIG	11/09/2024	16/01/2026
46	Kaliraj Mahesh Kumar	IGP	16/01/2026	28/10/2026

== See also ==
- Thiruvananthapuram City Police
- Kerala Police
