= Thiruvananthapuram City Police =

Police commissionerate in India

Thiruvananthapuram City Police തിരുവനന്തപുരം സിറ്റി പോലീസ്‌
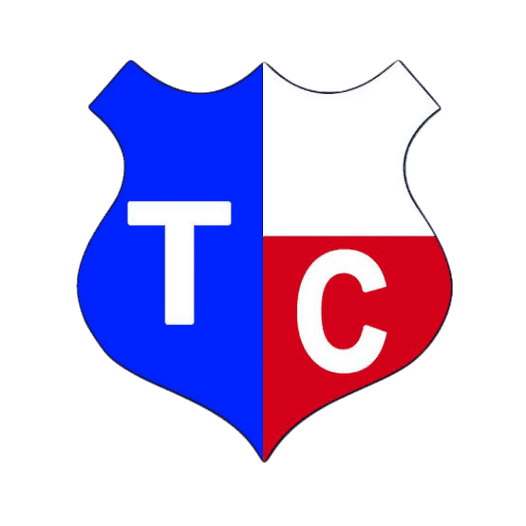
- Logo of the Thiruvananthapuram City Police

- Badge of Thiruvananthapuram City Police

- The official flag of Kerala Police, which is used by Thiruvananthapuram City Police.
- Common name: Thiruvananthapuram City Police Department
- Abbreviation: TCPD
- Motto: "Citizens First"

Agency overview
- Formed: 1881
- Preceding agency: Travancore State Police Force

Jurisdictional structure
- Operations jurisdiction: Thiruvananthapuram, IN
- Area: 316.00 km^{2}
- Population: 1,067,861
- Legal jurisdiction: Entire Thiruvananthapuram Municipal Corporation area, including urban, suburban, coastal, and Technopark regions.
- General nature: Local civilian police

Operational structure
- Overseen by: Government of Kerala (Home Department)
- Headquarters: The Office of Commissioner of Police, Thiruvananthapuram
- Elected officer responsible: Ramesh Chennithala (Home Minister of Kerala)
- Agency executives: Arul RB Krishna IPS, Commissioner of Police; Shahansha KS IPS, Deputy Commissioner of Police (L&O 1); Deepak Dhankar IPS, Deputy Commissioner of Police (L&O 2); Sheen Tharayil KPS, Deputy Commissioner of Police (Administration & Crimes)
- Parent agency: Kerala Police
- Child agency: Thiruvananthapuram City Traffic Police
- Units: List: District Crime Branch; District Special Branch; District Crime Records Bureau; City Armed Reserve (DHQ); Narcotics Cell; Highway Police; Traffic Enforcement; Pink Police Patrol; K9 Squad; Cyber Cell
- Sub-divisions: 4: Cantonment; Fort; Shangumugham; Cyber city

Facilities
- Police Stations: 24: Local: 21; Women: 1; Coastal: 1; TEU: 1

Website
- Official website

The Thiruvananthapuram City Police is the police force of the city of Thiruvananthapuram, Kerala, India. It has the primary responsibilities of law enforcement and investigation within the limits of Thiruvananthapuram. It is headed by the Police Commissioner of Thiruvananthapuram, who is generally an Indian Police Service (IPS) officer holding the IG rank. There is currently 24 police stations in the city. White Patrol and mobile units are in operation and their movements are supervised by marshal units.

Thiruvananthapuram City Police Mobile App, also known as TCP app, or iSafe, is the official mobile application for the citizens and public by the Thiruvananthapuram City Police.

== Organisation ==
=== Office of the Commissioner of Police, Thiruvananthapuram City ===
The Thiruvananthapuram City Police is headed by a Commissioner of Police (CP), officially designated as the District Police Chief, Thiruvananthapuram City. The CP is an Indian Police Service (IPS) officer, typically holding the rank of Inspector General of Police (IGP) or Deputy Inspector General of Police (DIG). The Commissioner is assisted by Deputy Commissioners of Police (DCPs), with the rank of Superintendent of Police (SP). Each DCP is in charge of a specific area of responsibility: Law and Order & Traffic, Administration & Crimes, Security.

=== Law and Order ===
The Law and Order is incharge of a Deputy Commissioner of Police (DCP). The DCP is responsible for maintaining peace and order, managing protests and public gatherings, and handling law and order situations. The DCP (L&O) oversees the functioning of police subdivisions and individual police stations.

For administrative purposes, the city is divided into four police subdivisions: Cantonment, Fort, Shanghumugham, and Cyber City. Each subdivision is headed by an Assistant Commissioner of Police (ACP), who holds the rank of Deputy Superintendent of Police (DYSP). Each police subdivision encompasses several police stations within its jurisdiction. There are 24 police stations in Thiruvananthapuram city. Each police station is headed by a Station House Officer (SHO), who holds the rank of Inspector of Police. Each police station has a defined territorial jurisdiction and is responsible for maintaining law and order, crime prevention, and criminal investigations within its designated area. The SHO is assisted by Sub Inspectors (SIs), Assistant Sub Inspectors (ASIs), Senior Civil Police Officers (SCPOs) and Civil Police Officers (CPOs).

=== City Traffic Police ===
The Thiruvananthapuram City Traffic Police, responsible for traffic enforcement and traffic management in the city limits. The Deputy Commissioner of Police, (L&O and Traffic) supervise its activities.

For operational purposes, the traffic division is split into two subdivisions: Traffic North and Traffic South. Each subdivision is headed by an Assistant Commissioner of Police (ACP) and consists of several traffic enforcement units (Traffic PSs) led by Inspectors or Sub-Inspectors.

=== Administration and Crimes ===
A Deputy Commissioner of Police (DCP) manages administrative functions, including personnel, training, and resources. The DCP also supervises the District Special Branch (intelligence), District Crime Branch (special crime investigations), District Crime Records Bureau, and the Narcotic Cell (narcotics crime prevention). Each of these special units is headed by an Assistant Commissioner of Police (ACP).

=== District Headquarter (DHQ) Camp ===
The District Headquarters, Thiruvananthapuram City (DHQ), is the Armed Reserve Police unit of the City Police. The DHQ provides armed personnel to assist the local police in maintaining law and order, managing public events, riot control, disaster response, and VIP security.

=== Hierarchy ===
- Commissioner of Police (CP)
- Additional Commissioner of Police (Addl.CP)
- Deputy Commissioner of Police (DCP)
- Assistant Commissioner of Police (ACP)

Subordinate officers

- Inspector of Police (IP)
- Sub-Inspector of Police (SI)
- Assistant Sub Inspector of Police (ASI)
- Senior Civil Police Officer (SCPO)
- Civil Police Officer (CPO)

Thiruvananthapuram City Police Structure, Insignia, and Equivalent Ranks
Post/Designation	Abbreviation	Insignia	Equivalent IPS/State Police Rank	Description
Commissioner of Police	CP		IGP or DIG	Head of the city police force
Additional Commissioner of Police	Addl.CP		DIG	Assist the City Police Commissioner on various tasks. The post is currently vacant.
Deputy Commissioner of Police	DCP		SP	In charge of Law & Order and Traffic, Crimes, Administration, Security, etc.
Assistant Commissioner of Police	ACP		ASP / DySP	Heads a police sub-division or special unit;

== Units ==
The City Police consists of following units:

- Law and order unit

This unit consists of 4 police subdivisions and 24 police stations. This unit is responsible for law and order maintenance as well as prevention and detection of crimes.

- Traffic unit

This unit consists of two subdivisions. This unit manages the traffic in the city.

- Control Room
- District Armed Reserve

This is the reserve force of Thiruvananthapuram City Police to assist the Local Police.

- Narcotics cell

This unit is responsible for the controlling of narcotics and drugs.

- Crime Detachment

This unit investigates some special cases.

- City Special Branch

This unit provides intelligence inputs to City Police.

- Dog Squad

This unit is responsible for the training of police dogs and their fitness.

- Mounted Police

This unit is responsible for the training of horses and their fitness.

- District Crime Records Bureau

This unit keeps the records of the criminals.

- Foreigners Registration Office

This unit is keeps records of foreigners.

- Tourist Police

Provides help to the tourists visiting the place and to maintain law and order at tourist spots.

- Women Police (Vanitha Cell)

== List of Police Stations ==
Sn	Station name	Sub division
1	Cantonment Police Station	Cantonment Subdivision
2	Museum Police Station	Cantonment Subdivision
3	Vanchiyoor Police Station	Cantonment Subdivision
4	Peroorkada Police Station	Cantonment Subdivision
5	Vanitha (Women) Police Station	Cantonment Subdivision
6	Fort Police Station	Fort Subdivision
7	Thampanoor Police Station	Fort Subdivision
8	Pettah Police Station	Fort Subdivision
9	Poojappura Police Station	Fort Subdivision
10	Kovalam Police Station	Shanghumugham Subdivision
11	Nemom Police Station	Shanghumugham Subdivision
12	Medical College Police Station	Shanghumugham Subdivision
13	Sreekariyam Police Station	Shanghumugham Subdivision
14	Mannanthala Police Station	Shanghumugham Subdivision
15	Kazhakootam Police Station	Cyber City Subdivision (Kazhakootam)
16	Vattiyoorkavu Police Station	Cyber City Subdivision (Kazhakootam)
17	Valiyathura Police Station	Cyber City Subdivision (Kazhakootam)
18	Vizhinjam Police Station	Cyber City Subdivision (Kazhakootam)
19	Vizhinjam Coastal Police Station	Cyber City Subdivision (Kazhakootam)
20	Thiruvallam Police Station	Cyber City Subdivision (Kazhakootam)
21	Thumba Police Station	Cyber City Subdivision (Kazhakootam)
22	Ponmudi Police Station	Cyber City Subdivision (Kazhakootam)
23	Cyber Crime Police Station, Thycaud	Special / Other Units
	Traffic Enforcement Unit, Pattom	City Traffic Division

== See also ==
- Kochi City Police
- Kerala Police
