= Operation Toofan =

Anti-narcotics initiative in Kerala, India

Operation Toofan: The Narco Hunt
- Date: 2 June 2026 – present
- Location: Kerala, India
- Type: Statewide anti-narcotics operation
- Organised by: Home Department; Kerala Police
- Participants: Excise, Health, General Education, Higher Education, Local Self-Government, and Revenue departments; central law enforcement agencies
- Outcome: Ongoing anti-narcotics campaign
- Arrests: 2575 (as of mid-June 2026)

Operation Toofan, officially Operation Toofan: The Narco Hunt, is an anti-narcotics campaign run in Kerala, India, by the state Home Department, and the Kerala Police. It was announced by Home Minister Ramesh Chennithala in May 2026, shortly after the United Democratic Front (UDF) took office, and was formally launched on 2 June 2026. It is one of the first major programmes of the government led by Chief Minister V. D. Satheesan.

The campaign sets out to combine police enforcement with public awareness and rehabilitation, and is run jointly by several state departments with support from central agencies. Chennithala has said its aims include dismantling trafficking networks, curbing the spread of synthetic drugs such as MDMA, and reducing the supply of narcotics around schools and colleges. "Toofan" is a Hindi word meaning storm.
The Kerala Excise Department has also launched an anti-drug enforcement campaign named "Operation Thunder".

== Background ==
Kerala has recorded a rising number of cases under the Narcotic Drugs and Psychotropic Substances Act, 1985 over several years. Figures the Ministry of Home Affairs gave Parliament showed 5,695 cases in 2021 and 26,619 in 2022, the most of any Indian state that year. Later reporting, drawing on National Crime Records Bureau and state data, put the count at 27,530 cases in 2024 and 36,314 in 2025. An account citing the Kerala Police website said more than 40,000 cases had been registered since 2020. Commentators have linked the rise both to heavier enforcement and to the spread of synthetic drugs, particularly MDMA.

Drug policy was a prominent issue in the campaign for the April 2026 Kerala Legislative Assembly election, which the UDF won. The Satheesan ministry took office on 18 May 2026, with Chennithala holding the Home and Vigilance portfolios. Around the same period the neighbouring state of Tamil Nadu, which had also recently held elections, launched its own anti-narcotics drive, the Drug-Free Tamil Nadu Campaign.

The state had run earlier anti-drug efforts. The Vimukthi Mission, launched in 2016 with cricketer Sachin Tendulkar as ambassador, combined de-addiction and awareness work. The Kerala Police later ran Operation D-Hunt, a statewide drive against trafficking and consumption, though sources give differing dates for its launch. As Home Minister in the Oommen Chandy government between 2011 and 2016, Chennithala had run Operation Suraksha against crime and drugs, and ahead of the 2025 local body and 2026 assembly elections he led an anti-drug campaign called Proud Kerala.

== Announcement and launch ==
Chennithala announced the campaign on 23 May 2026 after a meeting at the police headquarters, presenting it alongside a wider set of policing changes. He said drug users, peddlers, suppliers and distribution networks would be placed under surveillance, that the Director General of Police would coordinate with counterparts in other states against interstate syndicates, and that action would be taken against tobacco sales near schools and against drug use at hotels, DJ parties and gatherings in backwater and coastal areas. In the same announcement he set out unrelated measures on police station functioning, cybercrime and the welfare of police personnel.

According to an official statement, the operation was timed to the reopening of schools for the new academic year and was formally launched on 2 June 2026 at the Government Higher Secondary School for Girls at Cotton Hill in Thiruvananthapuram. Chennithala said the structural plan had been finalised so that the campaign could take effect as the academic year began.

== Structure and methods ==
The police describe Operation Toofan as having three parts. Toofan Strike is the enforcement wing and focuses on raids, seizures and supply-chain investigation; Toofan Warriors is the awareness wing; and Toofan Care covers rehabilitation and counselling for people with drug dependency. Actor Mohanlal and the religious leader Kanthapuram A. P. Aboobacker Musliyar are among the public figures associated with Toofan Warriors; Chennithala announced Mohanlal's involvement in mid-June 2026.

The campaign is run by the Home and Excise departments with support from the Health, Education, Revenue and Local Self-Government departments, alongside state intelligence agencies. Putta Vimaladitya, Inspector General of Police (North Zone), was named State Nodal Officer, with the work carried out by district police units and local stations. The anti narcotics operations are carried out by the Kerala Police's special wings—DANSAF (District Anti-narcotics Special Action Force), and District Narcotics Cells—jointly with local police units. The State Special Branch (SSB) set up a unit called T-INT to identify and shut down sources of drug supply. The state also sought cooperation from central agencies including the Intelligence Bureau (IB), the Narcotics Control Bureau (NCB), the Directorate of Revenue Intelligence (DRI), Customs, the Coast Guard and the Railway Protection Force (RPF), and said it would hold periodic coordination meetings at airports and seaports.

Officials said the operation would use technology-led methods, including wastewater analysis near schools, colleges and residential areas to identify areas of high drug use, drone-assisted patrolling in vulnerable locations, and cyber teams to track online drug sales and darknet activity. The government said it would attach assets linked to trafficking through confiscation proceedings, introduce anti-drug modules in schools, and strengthen community-led prevention.

== Reported operations and outcomes ==
After the first fortnight, Chennithala told a press conference in mid-June 2026 that 2,575 cases had been registered and 2,778 people arrested, with seizures valued at over ₹10 crore. He said the haul included about 1,589 g of MDMA, 146.49 kg of ganja, 141 cannabis plants, 464.045 g of hashish oil, 350.439 g of brown sugar and 11 LSD stamps, along with banned tobacco products. Of the cases registered at that point, 838 involved small quantities, 78 medium quantities and 24 commercial quantities. He said 1,526 awareness classes and 138 counselling sessions had been held, and that investigations into supply networks had led to the arrest of two foreign nationals in Delhi and Bengaluru.

By the end of the third week the state police headquarters put the running total at 3,910 cases, 4,201 arrests, 1,932 g of MDMA and about 339 kg of cannabis. Individual seizures reported in this period included 18 kg of hybrid ganja in Kochi, MDMA worth about ₹25 lakh seized in Malappuram on 26 June, and the arrest in Kozhikode of a man accused of trying to smuggle heroin.

== Arrests and seizures ==
Arrests and seizures as of 4 July 2026
Category	Total
Drug-related cases registered	5,260
Persons arrested	5,634
Seizures
MDMA	3,706.743 g
Ganja	392.100 kg
Hashish oil	3,776.039 g
Hashish	4.85 g
Brown sugar	657.219 g
Methamphetamine	12.6709 g
Heroin	31.23 g
Opium	25.23 g
Nitrazepam	56 g
LSD	11 stamps
Ganja plants	428 plants

== Public engagement ==
The campaign makes use of social media and public tip-offs. Two contact numbers were set up for the public to share anonymous information, which the police say is checked before any action is taken. Kerala Police accounts post videos of raids, seizures and awareness events, and the outreach extends to podcasts and to campaigns featuring well-known figures.

== See also ==
- Kerala Police
- Law enforcement in India
- Narcotic Drugs and Psychotropic Substances Act, 1985
