= Ravada A. Chandrasekhar =

Director General of Police, Kerala

State Police Chief of Kerala
- Incumbent
- Assumed office 1 July 2025
- Preceded by: Sheikh Darvesh Saheb

Personal details
- Born: 5 July 1966 (age 59) West Godavari, Andhra Pradesh, India
- Occupation: Police officer
- Police career
- Department: Kerala Police
- Service years: 1991–present
- Rank: Director General of Police
- Batch: 1991
- Cadre: Indian Police Service (Kerala Cadre)

Ravada Azad Chandrasekhar is a 1991-batch Indian Police Service (IPS) officer who currently serves as the state police chief of Kerala. Before his appointment as the Chief of Kerala Police, he was Special Director in the Intelligence Bureau (IB).

== Early life and education ==
Chandrasekhar hails from Veeravasaram in the West Godavari district of Andhra Pradesh. He joined in the Indian Police Service in 1991 and was allocated the Kerala cadre.

== Career ==
Chandrasekhar has served in various policing assignments at the state and central levels. He held senior roles in the Intelligence Bureau and was serving as its Special Director at the time of his appointment as the Kerala State Police Chief.

=== State Police Chief, Kerala ===
The Government of Kerala appointed Chandrasekhar as the Director General of Police and State Police Chief on 1 July 2025, succeeding Dr Shaik Darvesh Saheb. His appointment was widely reported by both national and regional media.

== Controversies ==
=== 1994 Koothuparamba firing ===
Chandrasekhar's appointment has drawn public discussion about the 1994 Koothuparamba firing in Kannur district, in which five Democratic Youth Federation of India (DYFI) activists were killed. As then-Assistant Superintendent of Police, he was one of the senior officers present at the scene. Criminal proceedings against all the police officers in the case were later quashed by the Kerala High Court.

The firing incident even today continues to be a politically sensitive topic in Kerala and has been referenced by various media outlets in commentary on his tenure.

== Regional media coverage ==
Chandrasekhar's appointment as the State Police Chief was widely reported in multiple regional languages, including Malayalam and Telugu, contributing to his public notability in South India.

== See also ==
- Kerala Police
- Indian Police Service
- Intelligence Bureau
- Koothuparamba firing
