= Anil Kant =

Indian Police Service officer

Anil Kant IPS, PMMS

Director General of Police and State Police Chief, Kerala
- In office 2021–2023
- Preceded by: Lokanath Behera
- Succeeded by: Sheikh Darvesh Saheb

Personal details
- Born: Delhi
- Occupation: IPS Officer
- Awards: Police Medal for Meritorious Service
- Police career
- Department: Kerala Police
- Service years: 1988-2023
- Rank: Director General of Police
- Badge no.: 10663221

Anil Kant is a 1988 batch retired Indian Police Service (IPS) officer who served as the State Police Chief and Director General of Police of Kerala. He was the former Road Safety Commissioner of Kerala. He is the first dalit officer on the chief post in the police department of Kerala. Kant is from Delhi.

== Education ==
Kant holds a Master's degree in Political science.

== Personal life ==
Kant is married to Preeta Harit and has a son Rohan. He is son of Late Rumal Singh and Shankuntala.

== Career ==
Kant is a 1988 batch IPS officer. He started his career in the Kerala cadre as an assistant superintendent in Kalpetta, in Wayanad district. He also served in Thiruvananthapuram rural and Railway in the same position. Provided distinguished services as Kochi City Police Commissioner and SP in Malappuram, Ernakulam, as also served in State Crime Branch and Special Branch as IG.

He also served as the chief of Vigilance and Anti-Corruption Bureau, Prisons and Correctional Services and Fire and Rescue Services.

Prior to being appointed as the DGP of the Kerala Police, he served as Road Safety Commissioner. He was chosen by Pinarayi Vijayan, the Chief Minister of Kerala, after a cabinet meeting.

Notably, Kant made history as the first Dalit officer to hold the esteemed chief post within the Kerala police department.

== Awards ==
Kant was awarded the President's Police Medal for meritorious services and also received Badge of Honour in 2018 for the successful conduct of All India Police Games.
