= Raman Srivastava =

Indian police chief

Raman Sriwastaw
- Police career
- Country: Indian Police Service
- Rank: former Director General of Border Security Force

Raman Srivastava was a 1973 batch Indian Police Service officer who served as the Director general of police in Kerala Police from February 2005 till November 2008. He is also a former Director General of the Border Security Force (BSF), the border patrol agency of the Government of India.

== Career ==
Srivastava was a 1973 batch IPS officer of the Kerala cadre. Before becoming Director General of BSF, he was Special Secretary (Internal Security) in the Ministry of Home Affairs. Before that, he served as Director General of Police of Kerala and occupied various policing positions in a 33 year career. He also maintained very cordial relations with all parties and factions, notably K. Karunakaran, Oommen Chandy and Pinarayi Vijayan. In 2017, he was appointed by Pinarayi Vijayan as a special police advisor of the rank of the Chief Secretary.

== Controversy ==
He was caught in a controversy following his alleged involvement in the ISRO spy ring case in the 1990s which was obviously a fake allegation on the part of other Indian Police Service officers investigating the case. Later, Supreme Court of India itself dismissed the case for being vague and baseless. He also dragged serious controversy over his alleged order resulting in the death of a 11-year-old girl named Sirajunnisa, during his tenure in the State of Kerala as the Deputy Inspector General of Police.

| Preceded by M. L. Kumawat | Director General of BSF; 1 August 2009 – 31 October 2011 | Succeeded by U K Bansal |
