= Kerala Police =

Law enforcement agency for Kerala, India

Kerala State Police
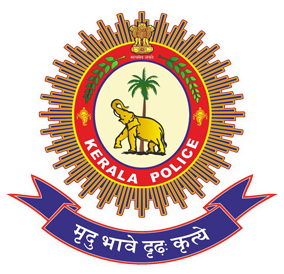
- Emblem

- Flag
- Abbreviation: KP
- Motto: "Mridhu Bhave Dhrida Kruthye" "Soft in Temperament, Firm in Action"

Agency overview
- Formed: November 1, 1956; 70 years ago
- Annual budget: ₹6,579.53 crore (US$700 million) (2026–27 est.)

Jurisdictional structure
- Operations jurisdiction: Kerala, IN
- Jurisdiction of Kerala Police
- Area: 15,008.13 sq mi (38,870.88 km^{2})
- Population: 34,630,192
- Legal jurisdiction: As per operations jurisdiction
- Governing body: Home Department, Government of Kerala
- Constituting instrument: Kerala Police Act, 2011 Police Act, 1861
- General nature: Local civilian police

Operational structure
- Headquarters: Vazhuthacaud, Thiruvananthapuram, Kerala – 695010
- Map of Kerala Police Department's jurisdiction. The map on left shows Kerala in India and on right shows the State with Thiruvananthapuram district in red.
- Sworn members: 62,618 (Sanctioned); 57,819 (Actual)
- Minister responsible: Ramesh Chennithala, Minister for Home and Vigilance
- Agency executive: Ravada A. Chandrasekhar, IPS, State Police Chief
- Units: List of units: Law and Order Division; Crime Branch; State Special Branch; Training (Kerala Police Academy); Armed Police Battalions; Kerala Coastal Police; State Crime Records Bureau; Protection of Civil Rights; Kerala Police Cyber Division; Traffic and Road Safety Management; Administration (HQ)
- Specialized Units: List: Highway Police; Tourism Police; Traffic Enforcement Unit; Railway Police; Mounted Police; Coastal Police; Temple Police; Cyber Division; Forensic Division; Women Cell; Pink Patrol; Police Telecommunication; Police Motor Transport Wing; K9 Squad; High-Tech Crime Cell; Anti-Terrorism Squad; Special Operation Group; BDDS; DANSAF

Facilities
- Police Stations: 564 (as of 2021) List: Local: 484; Women's: 14; Railways: 13; Coastal: 18; Cyber Crime: 19; Crime Branch: 1; ATS: 1
- Police vehicles: List: Force Gurkha Mahindra Bolero Tata Sumo Mahindra TUV300 Toyota Innova Chevrolet Tavera Mahindra Thar Swift Dzire Suzuki Jimny
- Dogs: 82 (41 Sniffer Dogs)
- Horses: 25

Notables
- Programme: List of key Projects; Student Police Cadet Project; Janamaithri Suraksha Project; Kerala Police Cyberdome
- Significant Operation: Operation Toofan

Website
- keralapolice.gov.in

The Kerala Police is the law enforcement agency for the Indian state of Kerala. Kerala Police has its headquarters in Thiruvananthapuram, the state capital. The motto of the force is "Mridhu Bhave Dhrida Kruthye" which means "Soft in Temperament, Firm in Action" in Sanskrit. It operates under the administrative control of the Home Department, Government of Kerala. The force is headed by the Director General of Police-cum-State Police Chief, and the incumbent chief is Ravada A Chandrasekhar, IPS.

Kerala Police has a reputation for being one of the best-managed state police forces in the country, and the state ranks among the top states for maintaining law and order. One of the first police forces in South Asia to put community policing into practise is Kerala Police, which was one of the first to do so through legislation. The term "Janamaithri" Policing, which means "people-friendly Policing," is used to refer to it.

According to the data from Bureau of Police Research and Development (BPRD), there are a total of 564 police stations in Kerala. Among them, 484 police stations deal with local law enforcement, while the remaining 80 are specialised for specific purposes. Out of these, 382 police stations are located in rural areas, while 102 police stations are located in urban areas. The specialized police stations include 14 women's police stations, 13 railway police stations, 18 coastal police stations, 19 cybercrime police stations, 1 crime branch police station, and 1 ATS police station.

The rural police stations account for the majority of police stations in Kerala, constituting approximately 68% of the total. The urban police stations account for about 18% of the total, while the special purpose police stations account for about 14% of the total.

== History ==
Prior to independence, the Kerala Police was governed by different administrations.

Kerala Police traces its roots to the erstwhile Travancore State Police, which was established in 1936. After the integration of the princely states of Travancore and Cochin, the present-day Kerala Police was formed in 1956. The first Chief of Kerala Police was Shri. N.Chandrasekharan Nair IPS. N. Chandrasekharan Nair IPS became the first Inspector General of Police (IGP) of Kerala and is often recognised as the first police chief of the state.

In 1960, the Kerala Police was given more powers and duties by the enactment of the Kerala Police Act of 1960. This legislative framework provided the foundation for modern policing in Kerala. The first women's police station in India was established in Kozhikode in 1973 and was inaugurated by the then Prime Minister of India, Smt. Indira Gandhi.

In 1981, the position of the head of the Kerala Police department was elevated to Director General of Police (DGP). T. Ananta Shankara Iyer IPS became the first DGP of Kerala.

In 2017, the Kerala Police implemented a major restructuring of its field policing system. Until then, two or three police stations were grouped into a police circle headed by a Circle Inspector (CI), while individual police stations were commanded by a Sub-Inspector (SI) serving as the Station House Officer (SHO). As part of the restructuring, the police circle system was abolished, and Circle Inspectors were designated as Inspector Station House Officers (Inspector SHOs) in charge of police stations. Sub-Inspectors (SIs) continued to serve under the Inspector SHO, handling either law and order or crime investigation duties as part of the separation of these functions at the police station level.

In 2019, Kerala Police underwent a structural change in leadership: previously, two Additional Directors General of Police (ADGPs) oversaw the Northern and Southern Police Zones; however, these positions were downgraded to Inspector General (IGP) rank. The charge of the Police Zones was entrusted to Inspectors General of Police (IGPs) and placed under the single command of the Additional Director General of Police (Law and Order). Sheikh Darvesh Saheb IPS become the first ADGP law and order of the state.

Following the formation of the UDF government in 2026, the police circle system was reinstated in most areas. The Kerala government announced that, with effect from 15 August 2026, the Inspector SHO system, under which Inspector-ranked officers function as SHOs, would be limited to 65 major police stations with higher crime rates or strategic importance. Based on the recommendations of an expert committee, Sub-Inspectors (SIs) would be reinstated as Station House Officers (SHOs) in the remaining 419 police stations, functioning under the supervision of Circle Inspectors (CIs).

== Current general/flag officers ==
Sl.No	Name	Status	Rank
1	Ravada Azad Chandrasekhar IPS	State Police Chief	DGP
2	P Vijayan IPS	ADGP, Law & Order & Cyber Operations (Addl. Charge)	ADGP
3	H Venkatesh IPS	ADGP, Crime Branch	ADGP
4	Dinendra Kashyap IPS	ADGP, Intelligence	ADGP
5	Balram Kumar Upadhyay IPS	ADGP, Armed Police Battalions	ADGP

== Organization ==
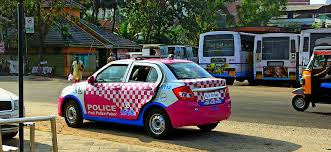
Pink Police Patrol on duty

=== Police headquarters ===
The Kerala Police is headed by the State Police Chief (SPC), who is the senior-most Indian Police Service (IPS) officer in the state and holds the rank of Director General of Police (DGP). The Director General of Police-cum-State Police Chief is appointed by the Government of Kerala from among the officers nominated by the Union Public Service Commission (UPSC).

The State Police Chief is designated as the head of the department for all administrative and operational purposes. The state police headquarters is also the office of the State Police Chief and is located in Thiruvananthapuram, the state's capital. The SPC is assisted by staff officers ranging from the Additional Director General of Police to the Deputy Superintendent of Police at the headquarters. The HQs oversees and coordinates the overall functioning of the police department in the state.

The state police structure comprises units such as Law & Order, Crime Branch, Armed Police Battalions, State Special Branch (Intelligence), Kerala Police Academy, Police Training College, Coastal Police, State Crime Records Bureau, Social Policing, Traffic and Road Safety Management, Economic Offences Wing, Anti-Terrorism Squad, Protection of Civil Rights, and Cyber Operations. Each unit is further divided into several divisions, zones, ranges, districts for better administration. Each unit is overseen by an officer with the rank of Additional Director General of Police (ADGP).

=== Hierarchy ===
Officers:

- Director General of Police and State Police Chief (DGP & SPC)
- Director General of Police (DGP)
- Additional Director General of Police (ADGP)
- Inspector General of Police (IG)
- Deputy Inspector General of Police (DIG)
- Superintendent of Police (SP)
- Additional Superintendent of Police (Addl.SP)
- Assistant Superintendent of Police (ASP) [IPS] or Deputy Superintendent of Police (DYSP) [KPS]
- Inspector of Police (IP) (Note: This rank is popularly known as Circle Inspector of Police. Circle Inspector was an earlier position in the Kerala Police. Although it is not a rank, this rank is widely recognized by the name of position "Circle Inspector.")
- Sub-Inspector of Police (SI)
- Assistant Sub-Inspector of Police (ASI)
- Head constable/Senior Civil Police Officer (SCPO)
- Constable/Civil Police Officer (CPO)

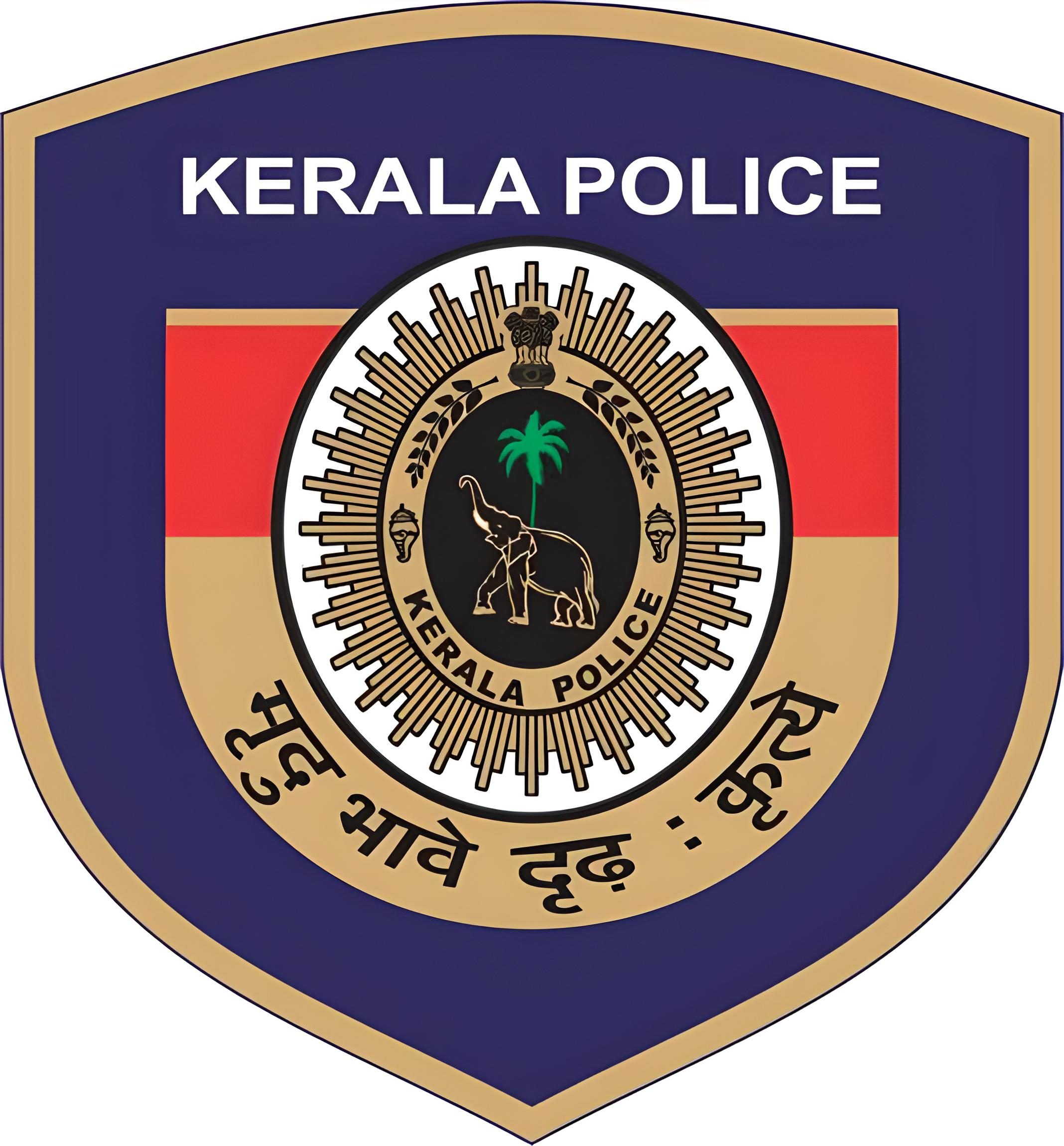
Kerala Police Sleeve Badge

=== Law and Order ===
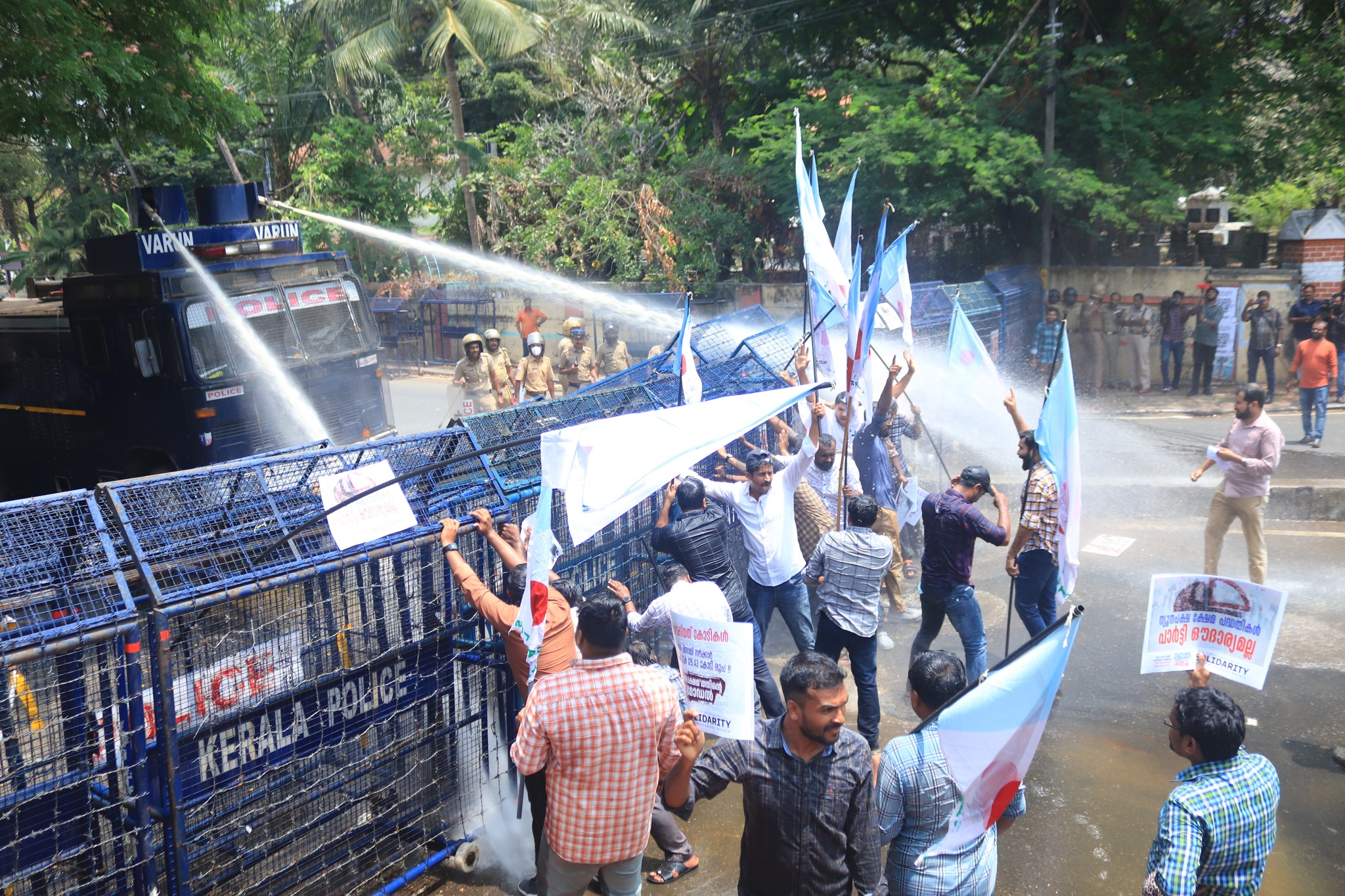
Kerala Police using a water cannon while maintaining law and order during a protest march.

The Law and Order Wing, also known as the General Executive Branch, is the uniformed operational wing of the Kerala Police and its primary arm for everyday policing. It is responsible for patrolling, crime prevention and investigation, traffic management, crowd control, emergency response, and maintenance of law and order. The wing is headed by an Additional Director General of Police (Law and Order), with headquarters in Thiruvananthapuram, and functions under the State Police Chief. It is organised into police zones, ranges, districts, subdivisions, and police stations. The incumbent ADGP (Law and Order) is P. Vijayan, IPS.

Zone
South Zone		North Zone	
Range
Thiruvananthapuram	Ernakulam	Thrissur	Kannur
Commissionerate (City police districts)
Thiruvananthapuram City		Kozhikode City	
Ernakulam City		Thrissur City	
Kollam City		Kannur City	
District Police (Rural police districts)
Thiruvananthapuram Rural	Kottayam	Thrissur Rural	Wayanad
Kollam Rural	Idukki	Palakkad	Kannur Rural
Pathanamthitta	Ernakulam Rural	Malappuram	Kasargod
Alappuzha		Kozhikode Rural	

==== Police zones ====
The state of Kerala is divided into two police zones: South Zone and North Zone. Each zone is headed by an Inspector General of Police (IGP). The headquarters of the South Zone is at Nandavanam in Thiruvananthapuram district and the North Zone is at Nadakkavu in Kozhikode. The zone is further divided into ranges, with each police range encompassing several police districts. There are four police ranges in total: Thiruvananthapuram Range, Ernakulam Range, Thrissur Range, and Kannur Range. Kannur Range and Thrissur Range comes under North Zone, whereas Ernakulam Range and Thiruvananthapuram Range comes under South Zone.

==== Police ranges ====
A police range consists several police districts under its jurisdiction. There are four police ranges: Thiruvananthapuram, Ernakulam, Thrissur and Kannur. Each range is headed by a Deputy Inspector General of Police (DIG).

Range	Police districts
Thiruvananthapuram	Thiruvananthapuram Rural, Kollam City, Kollam Rural, Pathanamthitta
Ernakulam	Alappuzha, Kottayam, Idukki, Ernakulam Rural
Thrissur	Thrissur City, Thrissur Rural, Palakkad, Malappuram
Kannur	Kozhikode City, Kozhikode Rural, Wayanad, Kannur City, Kannur Rural, Kasaragod

==== Police Commissionerates ====
A police Commissionerate is a law enforcement body especially in the urban parts of the state. The Commissionerate is headed by a Commissioner of Police (CP). There are Six Commissionerate under Kerala Police for Urban Area policing.

Currently Thiruvananthapuram City Police, Kochi City Police and Kozhikode City Police are headed by Commissioners of Police with the rank of Deputy Inspector General of Police (DIG). The remaining Kollam City Police, Thrissur City Police, and Kannur City Police are headed by Commissioners of the rank of Superintendent of Police (SP).

The Commissioners of Police in Thiruvananthapuram City, Kochi City, and Kozhikode City are assisted by Deputy Commissioners of Police (DCPs) with the rank of Superintendent of Police (SP). Each DCP is in charge of Law and Order, Crimes, Traffic, and Administration. The DCPs are assisted by Additional DCPs and Assistant Commissioners of Police (ACPs) with the rank of Deputy Superintendent of Police.

- The Commissionerates of Thiruvananthapuram City and Kochi City do not fall under police zones and ranges, and their Commissioners report directly to the State Police Chief through the ADGP (Law and Order).
- Presently these Commissionerates are not vested with magisterial powers.

==== Police districts ====
There are 20 police districts in total. Eight of these police districts are coterminous with the respective revenue districts, while the remaining 12 police districts are situated within revenue districts that are bifurcated into city and rural. Out of these 20 police districts, 14 are rural police districts, and 6 are city police districts (also known as police commissionerates).

Each police district is headed by a District Police Chief (DPC). The District Police Chief must be an officer holding the rank of Superintendent of Police (SP) or higher. In specific districts such as Thiruvananthapuram City, Kochi City, and Kozhikode City, the role of District Police Chief (commonly referred to as the Police Commissioner) is filled by higher-ranking officers, specifically those with the ranks of Inspector General of Police (IGP) and Deputy Inspector General of Police (DIG), and remaining police districts are headed by officers holding the rank of Superintendent of Police (SP). The DPC is assisted by an Additional Superintendent of Police (Addl.SP), and Deputy Superintendents of Police (DySPs). Each district comprises three or more subdivisions, several police stations and other special units.

The special units are District Special Branch, District Crime Branch, District Crime Records Bureau, Narcotics Cell, Women Cell, and the Armed Reserve Camp. These units are headed by Deputy Superintendents of Police (Dy.SPs).

==== Subdivisions ====
Each police district is divided into some subdivisions to supervise activities of several police stations under its jurisdiction. There are 91 police sub-divisions in Kerala. Each sub-division is headed by a Deputy Superintendent of Police (DySP) or an Assistant Commissioner of Police (ACP) in the case of city police sub-divisions.

The police officer in charge of a sub division is called Sub Divisional Police Officer (SDPO). DYSPs or ACPs are posted as SDPOs. A Sub-Divisional Police Officer (SDPO) supervises police stations headed by Inspectors as Station House Officers (ISHOs) and police circles headed by Circle Inspectors (CIs).

==== Police Stations ====
There are 484 local law and order police stations in Kerala. Each police station functions under a Station House Officer (SHO), who is the officer in charge of the police station. Of these, 1 police station, Mullaperiyar Police Station, functions under a Deputy Superintendent of Police (DySP) who serves as the Station House Officer (SHO), while 64 police stations are headed by Inspectors of Police (IP) as SHOs. The remaining 419 police stations are headed by Sub-Inspectors of Police (SI) as SHOs. These 419 sub-inspector-led police stations are organised into 200 police circles, generally comprising three police stations, each supervised by an Inspector of Police designated as Circle Inspector (CI).

A Police Station (PS) is the basic unit of policing, responsible for prevention and detection of crime, maintenance of public order, enforcing law in general as well as for performing protection duties and making security arrangements for the constitutional authorities, government functionaries, representatives of the public in different legislative bodies and local self governments, public figures etc. Kerala has 484 local police stations that handle routine law enforcement and investigations. In addition, there are 80 special police stations: coastal police stations manage coastal security, cybercrime police stations deal with cyber crimes, and women police stations handle crimes against women, such as domestic violence and harassment.

Inspectors in charge of police stations are known as Inspector SHOs (ISHO). In small police stations sub-inspectors are appointed as SHOs. At the police station level, there are typically two wings: the law and order wing and the crime investigation wing. These are headed by a sub-inspector of police (SIs) who oversees the respective functions of maintaining public order and conducting criminal investigations within the station's jurisdiction. The Station House Officer is assisted by personnel of the ranks of Sub Inspector, Assistant Sub Inspector, Senior Civil Police Officer, and Civil Police Officer in policing operations. The section known as General Executive is working in the police stations of Kerala.

Some police stations have outposts attached to them, which are typically headed by assistant sub-inspectors or senior civil police officers. A police outpost functions under the jurisdiction of its respective police station and is typically established in remote or rural areas within the limits of a large police station.

=== Other wings ===
==== District Investigation Unit (DIU) ====
The District C- Branch (District Crime Branch) functions under the respective District Police Chiefs. It was formerly known as the Crime Detachment, later redesignated as the District Crime Branch, and subsequently as the C-Branch. District C-Branch is headed by a Deputy Superintendent of Police/Assistant Commissioner of Police. It functions as the specialized investigating wing of the District Police Chief which is mandated to help in investigating sensational cases at the district level. The District Crime Branch is not subordinate to the State Crime Branch; instead, it operates under the Law and Order Wing of the state police.

==== District Special Branch ====
The District Special Branch (DSB) is the intelligence wing of the district police, functioning under the District Police Chief. It is headed by a Deputy Superintendent of Police (DySP) ranked officer and consists police officers of various ranks. It advises the District Police Chief through intelligence reports on matters affecting law and order and security within the district. It also undertakes antecedent and passport verification, Police Clearance Certificate and certificate verification, petition enquiries, and VIP/WIP security arrangements.

==== Tourism Police ====
Tourism Police wing has been functioning in the state for maintaining law and order, preventing attack and harassment on tourists. They also assist the tourists for getting tourist related information, guidance, etc. The uniform of Tourism Police Officers is sky blue shirt and khakee pants. International Tourism Police Station and Police Museum at Mattancherry in Ernakulam district is the first of its kind in the country which not only addresses grievances of tourists but also showcases the history of the Kerala Police. The primary aim of the station is to make the state of Kerala more tourist-friendly.

==== Traffic Police ====
The traffic wing is headed by the Inspector General of Police (Traffic and Road Safety Management), under whom the state is divided into two zones—North and South—each supervised by a Superintendent of Police (Traffic). Operationally, the traffic police function under the control of the respective District Police Chiefs. In major cities, traffic administration is overseen by Assistant Commissioners of Police. There are Traffic Enforcement Units (TEUs), formerly known as Traffic Police Stations, which are responsible for traffic management and road safety enforcement within their jurisdiction. Each TEU is headed by an Inspector (in the case of large cities) or a Sub-Inspector (in towns), and is assisted by police personnel and Home Guards.

==== Kerala Highway Police ====
Highway Police focus on traffic enforcement to prevent road accidents and assist victims. At present a total of 56 Highway Police Patrols are functioning along all the important Roads in Kerala.

Highway Police functions under the respective District Police Chiefs. Each Highway Police Vehicle is assigned an 'Operational area' and a Base Station. The Officers and men are deployed for duty in the Highway Patrol Vehicles are from various Police Stations in the Police District.

Highway police is responsible for patrolling national highways and state highways. They are tasked with traffic enforcement in highways, accident assistance, maintenance of law and order in highways.

==== Mounted Police ====
Kerala Police maintains a mounted unit headquartered at Kennettumukku, Thiruvananthapuram. Originating from the ceremonial guards of the Travancore state, the wing is employed for ceremonial programs, parades, public events, crowd control, and night and morning patrols. The unit has a sanctioned strength of 25 horses and functions under the Thiruvananthapuram City Police Commissioner. The wing is headed by a Reserve Inspector (Mounted Unit), with an assistant director (Veterinary) and a Livestock Inspector responsible for equine healthcare.

==== Police Control Room ====
The Control room serves as the central communication hub for police operations in a city or police district. It is responsible for receiving emergency calls (commonly through the 112 helpline), dispatching patrol units, and coordinating immediate police response to incidents. In cities and districts, Control Room Vehicles (CRVs) are deployed across strategic points to ensure immediate police presence and intervention. PCR units also coordinate closely with traffic, highway, and local police stations for effective field operations.

The State-level main control room (Police Chief Control Room) operates from the Police Headquarters in Thiruvananthapuram. District-level PCRs function under the direct supervision of the District Police Chief and are usually headed by an officer of DySP rank. In cities, they are supervised by the Deputy Commissioner of Police and headed by Assistant Commissioners of Police.

The CRV mobiles patrol across city and rural areas, and respond to emergency calls received through 112, as well as to law and order issues and other emergencies. Each CRV vehicle is led by an officer, usually a Sub-Inspector or Assistant Sub-Inspector, and is staffed by Civil Police Officers.

==== Pink Police Patrol ====
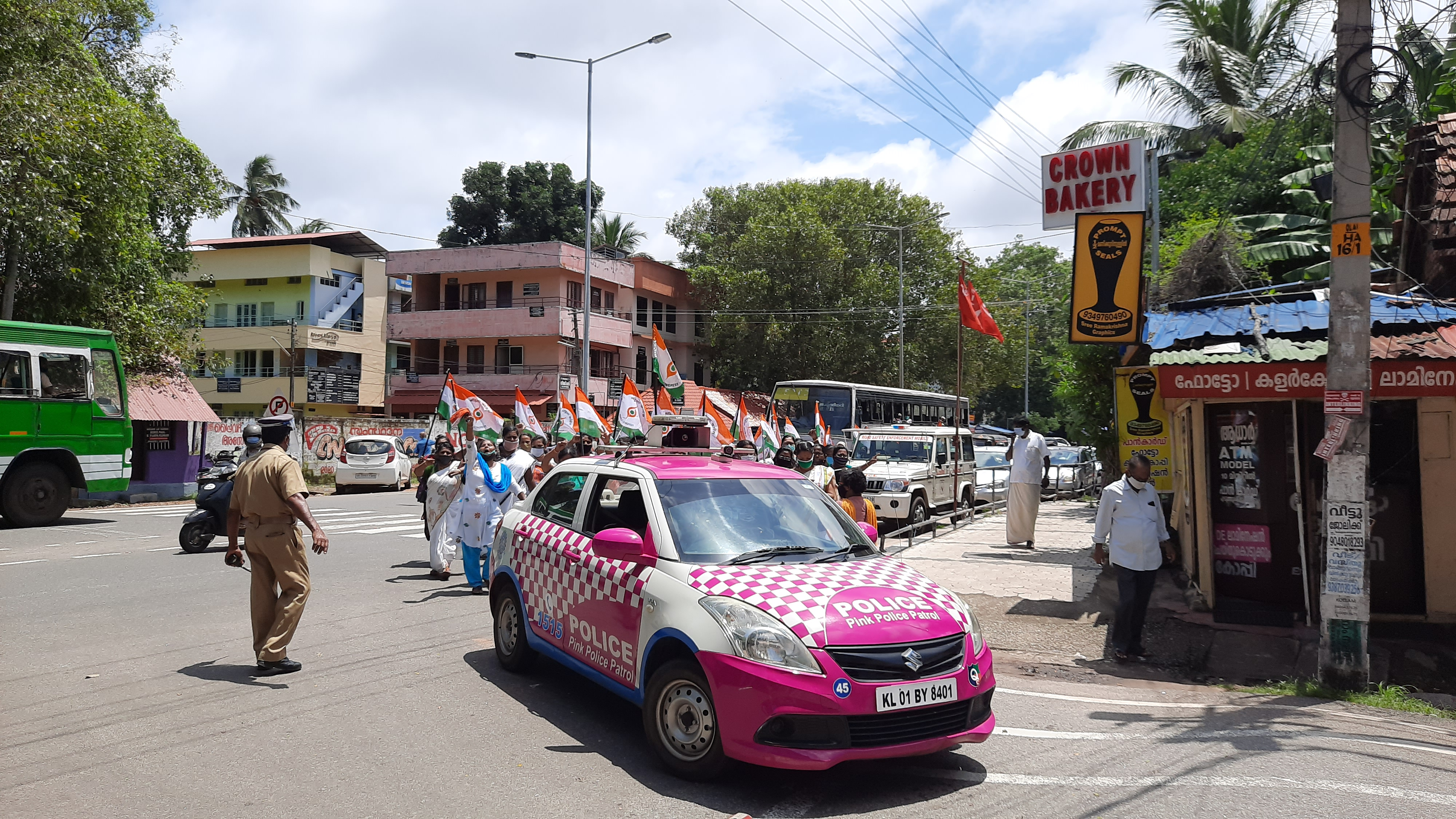
Pink Patrol personnel on patrol duty during a public protest in Kollam, Kerala.

As part of improving women safety in public places, Kerala Police has rolled out a special patrol team called pink patrol with all women police officers, patrolling across all the busy areas of the various cities of Kerala. Pink police ensures the safety of women and children, prevents harassment, and responds to distress calls through 112. The team has been allotted pink sedan cars. The Pink patrol vehicles are fitted with GPS and other smart equipments for faster response and assistance as well as has on-board cameras and scanning systems to identify potential offenders. It operates with a dedicated Pink Control Room (Dial 1515) and specially marked patrol vehicles. The patrols are staffed by women police officers, usually led by a woman Sub-Inspector or Assistant Sub-Inspector, and function under the supervision of district police chiefs.

There are a total of 52 Pink Police Patrol vehicles in Kerala, each staffed by three women officers, including the driver. These patrols operate from 8 AM to 8 PM.

==== Narcotic Cell ====
Narcotic Cell collects intelligence on Narcotic Drugs and Psychotropic Substances (NDPS) and pass it on to concerned police stations according to the gravity of cases. Monitoring and Supervising cases registered under NDPS Act is also done by this wing. Abkari raids are being conducted by Narcotic Cell on information. The District Anti-Narcotic Special Action Force (DANSAF) functions as the operational arm of the narcotic cells. District Narcotic Cell is functioning in all police districts, headed by an officer of the rank of Deputy Superintendent of Police, and under supervision of District Police Chiefs.

==== Women Cell ====
The Women Cell addresses complaints and cases involving violence against women, provides counselling and legal assistance, and conducts awareness and preventive programmes.

State Women and Children Cell is headed by an Assistant Inspector General of Police (AIG), Women and Children Cell. In addition, One District Women Cell is also functioning in all Police Districts, each headed by a Woman Inspector. The State Women Cell is functioning at the Police Headquarters in Thiruvananthapuram. The first Woman Police Station started at Kozhikode in 1973.

== Specialised units ==
=== Crime Branch ===
State Crime Branch
- ക്രൈം ബ്രാഞ്ച്
- Type: Criminal Investigation Department
- Role: Investigation of complex crimes, financial frauds, economic offences, undetected or sensitive cases, inter-state cases, etc.
- Headquarters: Thiruvananthapuram
- Abbreviation: CB

Structure
- Ranges: 3 List: Thiruvananthapuram; Ernakulam; Kozhikode
- Units: 14

Commanders
- Current commander: H Venkatesh IPS, ADGP, Crimes

The Crime Branch is the specialized investigation wing of the Kerala police. The Crime Branch has its headquarters in Thiruvananthapuram and headed by an officer of the rank of Additional Director General of Police (ADGP).

Crime Branch investigates cases that are entrusted to it by the State Police Chief or the Government or the High Court of Kerala. This department was earlier known as Crime Branch-Criminal Investigation Department (CB-CID).

Crime Branch is the Nodal agency for Interpol related matters in the State and conducts verifications or enquiries on behalf of Interpol.

Crime Branch is specialized in investigation of complex organized crimes, financial frauds, economic offences with huge ramifications, undetected or sensitive crime cases, cases with inter-state ramifications, etc. Crime Branch officers operate in plainclothes, similar to those in the Special Branch, and are primarily involved in investigative and intelligence-related duties.

The state crime branch includes special units like Economic Offences Wing, Organised Crime Wing, etc. The crime branch wing is divided into ranges and units. Each range is headed by an Inspector General of Police (IGP) and each unit is headed by a Superintendent of Police (SP). There are three ranges headquartered in Thiruvananthapuram, Ernakulam and Kozhikode. There are 14 district units under Crime Branch. The Crime Branch also includes Deputy Superintendents of Police, Detective Inspectors, Detective Sub Inspectors, Detective Assistant Sub Inspectors, Senior Civil Police Officers, and Civil Police Officers.

There is no direct recruitment to the Crime Branch; postings are typically made on deputation from the General Executive Branch (Civil Police) based on eligibility and experience.

=== State Special Branch ===
State Special Branch
- സംസ്ഥാന സ്പെഷ്യൽ ബ്രാഞ്ച്
- Type: State intelligence agency
- Role: intelligence gathering on: political; communal; security; national security; labour activity; security concerns; matters affecting law and order
- Common name: SBCID, SB-CID
- Abbreviation: SSB

Structure
- Ranges: 4
- Detachments: 17

Commanders
- Current commander: P. Vijayan IPS, ADGP, Intelligence

The State Special Branch (SSB) is the intelligence wing of the Kerala police. The State Special Branch has its headquarters in Thiruvananthapuram and headed by an officer of the rank of Additional Director General of Police (ADGP). The SSB currently operates four wings: 1) Intelligence 2). Internal Security 3) Security and 4) Administration. The following divisions operate under Internal Security: 1) Extremist Cell 2) A communal cell. 3) Organised Crime (IS), 4) Digital Surveillance Unit (DSU), and 5) Digital Security Data Bank. The Security Wing comprises the VVIP/VIP Security Team, the BDDS Wing, the Foreigners Wing, and the Passport & Verification Wing.

The ADGP, Intelligence is assisted by Inspectors General of Police, Deputy Inspectors General of Police, Superintendents of Police, Deputy Superintendents of Police, and subordinate officers. There are 4 Range offices, each headed by an SP, and 17 Detachments in districts led by DYSPs. In addition, Internal Security Wings operate in four Range offices under the supervision of DYSPs.

The State Special Branch (SSB) is primarily concerned with the collection, collation and dissemination of intelligence on and about various political, communal, terrorist, national security, and labour activities and with relation to various law and order issues like agitations, strikes, demonstrations, protests, etc. The SSB functions as the eyes and ears of the government.

=== Armed police battalions ===
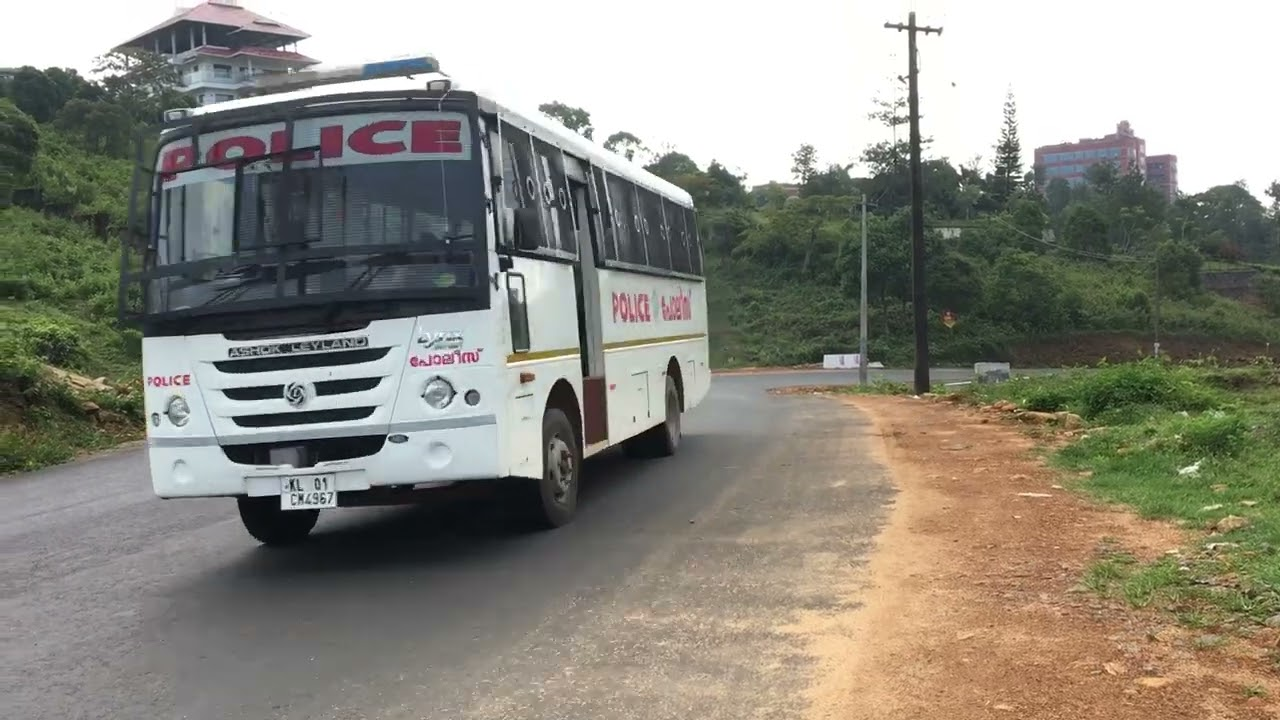
Armed police Bus

There are twelve armed police battalions in the state, which serve as reserve forces and are deployed whenever and wherever the district police require additional manpower for the maintenance of law and order. The Armed Police is under the command of the Additional Director General of Police (Armed Police Battalions), who functions under the overall control of the State Police Chief. The ADGP is assisted by a Deputy Inspector General of Police. Each battalion is headed by a Commandant of the rank of Superintendent of Police (SP), assisted by a Deputy Commandant and Assistant Commandants. The office of the Additional Director General of Police (Armed Police Battalions) is also the headquarters of the Armed Police Battalions, located in Thiruvananthapuram.

Malabar Special Police is the oldest paramilitary force of India after Assam Rifles, established during the period of British India.

=== Battalions ===
- Kerala Armed Police - KAP I (Tripunithura, Ernakulam)
- Kerala Armed Police - KAP II (Muttikulangara, Palakkad)
- Kerala Armed Police - KAP III (Adoor, Pathanamthitta)
- Kerala Armed Police - KAP IV (Dharmashala, Kannur)
- Kerala Armed Police - KAP V (Kuttikanam, Idukki)
- Kerala Armed Police - KAP VI (Valayam, Kozhikode)
- Malabar Special Police - MSP (Malappuram)
- Special Armed Police - SAP (Peroorkada, Thiruvananthapuram)
- Rapid Response and Rescue Force - RRRF (Pandikkad, Malappuram)
- India Reserve Battalion - IRBn (Ramavarmapuram, Thrissur)
- State Industrial Security Force - SISF (Peroorkada, Thiruvananthapuram)
- Armed Women Police Battalion - AWPBn (Kazhakkoottam, Thiruvananthapuram)

Their primary functions include controlling communal disturbances and riots, providing security during elections and major public events, assisting during natural disasters and emergencies, protecting vital installations and institutions, and reinforcing district police units when additional manpower is required. The Armed Police Cadre consists of personnel serving in the armed battalions and reserve units of the state police. Direct recruitment to the Armed Police Cadre is conducted at the ranks of Armed Police Constable and Armed Police Sub-Inspector (APSI) through the Kerala Public Service Commission.

=== Police Cyber Division ===
The Cyber Division is headed by an Inspector General of Police (IGP) with 465 personnel, it handles cybercrime prevention and investigation through wings for research & analysis, training, cyber patrolling, intelligence, and investigation, with Police Cyberdome serving as its R&D centre. The Cyber division has a total strength of 466 personnel, including two Superintendents of Police (SPs) and four Deputy Superintendents of Police (DySPs). All police units engaged in the investigation, research, and prevention of cybercrimes in the state come under the Cyber Division, including the Hi-Tech Crime Enquiry Cell of the Crime Branch, the Kerala Police Cyberdome, and the Cyber Crime Police Stations functioning in various police districts. There are Cyber Crime Police Stations for each of 20 police districts, who look after the cyber crime investigation.

=== Kerala Railway Police ===
The responsibility of the Kerala Railway Police is to maintain law and order, prevent and detect crime on the railways and railway stations in Kerala. The Kerala Railway Police is responsible for ensuring the safety and security of passengers and their belongings within the state's railway network. This includes preventing and detecting crimes both at railway stations and on trains. Their jurisdiction extends to the 1027 km of railway lines in Kerala. It is functioning incorporate with Railway Protection Force (RPF).

The Superintendent of Police (Railways) is the Unit Head and functions under supervision of A.D.G.P (Intelligence & Railways). There are 13 Railway Police Stations in Kerala. They are located in the main Railway station premises at Trivandrum Central, Parassala, Kollam, Punalur, Alappuzha, Kottayam, Ernakulam Junction, Thrissur, Shornur, Palakkad, Kozhikode, Kannur and Kasargod.

=== Kerala Coastal Police ===
The headquarters of Kerala Coastal Police is situated at Kochi. The Kerala Coastal Police is headed by an Inspector General of Police (IGP). The Inspector General (Coastal Police) is assisted by an Assistant Inspector General of Police (AIG). Coastal Police Stations handle the security of the coasts and carry out the patrolling in the sea up to 12 nautical miles. The cases reported on the sea (in the Territorial Waters) will be investigated by the Coastal Police. There are 18 Coastal Police Stations across the coastal areas of Kerala.

The first coastal police station in Kerala was the Neendakara Coastal Police Station, established in 2009 in Kollam district.

=== Anti-Terrorism Squad (ATS) ===
The Kerala Anti-Terrorism Squad (ATS), established in 2013, is a specialized unit dedicated to countering terrorism and extremist activities in the state. The Kerala ATS is headed by an Inspector General of Police (IGP). It is responsible for the investigation and intelligence related to terrorism and national security. It liaison with National Investigation Agency (NIA) (federal counter terrorism agency) and other state agencies.

The KATS is responsible for investigating and addressing terrorist-related activities, including threats from religious fundamentalism, organized terrorism, and left-wing extremism. The squad is empowered to act under various laws such as the Unlawful Activities (Prevention) Act (UAPA), Arms Act, and Explosives Act.

=== Thunderbolts ===
Thunderbolts is the elite commando unit of Kerala Police. It performs perilous counter-terrorism, jungle-warfare, and hostage-rescue operations. Thunderbolts are a form of SPG and NSG, which are trained to take on air, water and land attacks.

==== Avengers (Urban Commando Wing) ====
The Avengers Urban Commando Wing is a specialized tactical unit, established in February 2023 to address urban terrorism and high-risk threats in metropolitan areas. This elite force functions similarly to a SWAT team and is designed to respond swiftly to situations such as terrorist attacks, hostage crises, and the apprehension of high-value targets. Initially, the unit was deployed in major cities including Thiruvananthapuram, Kochi, and Kozhikode, with plans for further expansion based on operational needs. The unit comprises 96 commandos selected from the Thunderbolts (Kerala Police's primary commando force) and the India Reserve Battalion.

=== Special Operations Group (SOG) ===
The Special Operations Group (SOG) is an elite police unit of the Kerala Police, Primarily tasked with counter left-wing extremism operations, the SOG focuses on neutralizing Left-wing extremism, including Maoist activities. The SOG functions as a separate entity under the direct control of the State Police Chief, and is headed by a Superintendent of Police (SP). The SOG primarily operates in districts with a history of Left-wing extremism, such as Wayanad, Malappuram, Palakkad, etc.

=== Police technical divisions ===
- State Crime Records Bureau (SCRB): Maintains crime and criminal data and oversees various police technical divisions; headed by an ADGP or IGP.
- Information Communication and Technology (ICT) wing: Manages digital systems and IT infrastructure, headed by a Superintendent of Police (SP).
- Police Telecommunication unit: Oversees wireless communication networks, headed by a Superintendent of Police (SP).
- Finger Print Bureau: Handles fingerprint collection and identification.
- State Forensic Science Laboratory (FSL): Conducts scientific analysis of evidence.
- Police Motor Transport Wing: headed by an SP. This unit is responsible for matters related to motor transport, maintenance of department vehicles, etc.

== Ranks and insignia ==
Kerala Police IPS Cadre Insignia
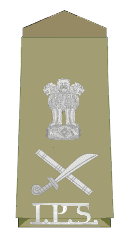
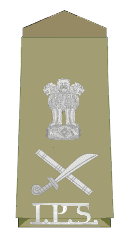
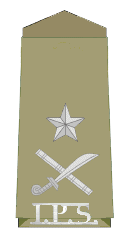
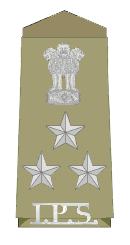
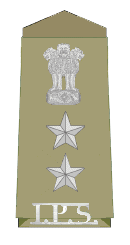
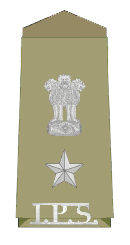
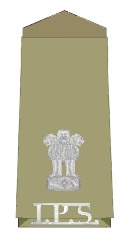
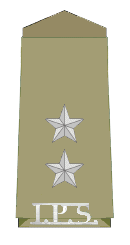
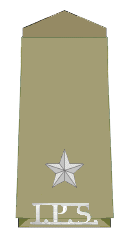
Rank group	General / flag officers					Senior officers			Junior officers
Insignia
Rank	Director General of Police	Additional Director General of Police (Note: Rank insignia of ADGP is similar to DGP.)	Inspector General of Police	Deputy Inspector General of Police	Superintendent of Police (Selection Grade) (Note: Also known as Senior Superintendent of Police or Assistant Inspector General of Police.)	Superintendent of Police	Additional superintendent of police (Note: The newly created Additional SP post is held by state police service (KPS) officers.)	Assistant Superintendent of Police	Assistant Superintendent of Police (Probationary Rank: 2 years of service)	Assistant Superintendent of Police (Probationary Rank: 1 year of service)
Abbreviation	DGP	ADGP	IG	DIG	SP (SG)	SP	Addl. SP	ASP	IPS Trainee	IPS Trainee
Note: Commissioner of Police is a post held by different rank officers in different places. For example, it is held by IG rank officers in Thiruvananthapuram City and Kochi City; by DIG rank officer in Kozhikode; by SP rank officers in Kollam City, Thrissur City, Kannur City etc.

Kerala Police Officers Insignia
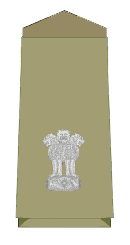
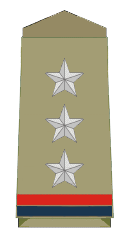
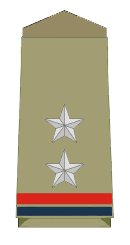
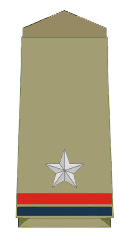
Gazetted Officers
Insignia
Rank	Superintendent of Police	Additional Superintendent of Police	Deputy Superintendent of Police	Inspector of Police (Note: Police Circles have been abolished and Circle Inspectors have been appointed as Inspector / Station House Officer. Nomenclature of CI is changed to IP/SHO.)
Abbreviation	SP	Addl.SP	DYSP	IP
Note: The rank of Inspector of Police is colloquially known as Circle Inspector (CI). Historically, the police circle office was overseen by an Inspector of Police with the designation of Circle Inspector. However, as of 2017, the specific post of Circle Inspector has been discontinued.
Non-Gazetted Officers
Insignia				No insignia
Rank	Sub Inspector of Police	Assistant Sub Inspector	Senior Civil Police Officer (Note: The designation of personnel holding the rank of Head Constable is Senior Civil Police Officer (SCPO).)	Civil Police Officer
Abbreviation	SI	ASI	SCPO	CPO

Kerala Armed Police Officers Insignia
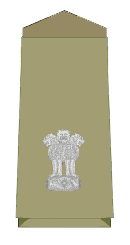
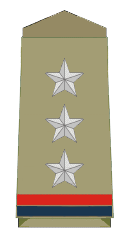
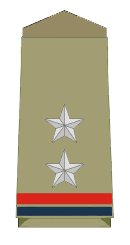
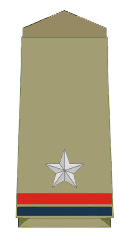
Gazetted Officers
Insignia
Rank	Commandant	Deputy Commandant	Assistant commandant	Armed Police Inspector
Abbreviation	Cmdt.	DC	AC	API
Equivalent civil police rank	SP	Addl.SP	DYSP	IP
Note: The Commandant is the head of each battalion, usually an IPS or KPS officer of the rank of SP. The District Armed Reserve (DHQ Camp) also has ranks like Deputy Commandant, Assistant Commandant, Reserve Inspector, and Reserve Sub Inspector.
Non-Gazetted Officers
Insignia				No insignia
Rank	Armed Police Sub Inspector	Armed Police Assistant Sub Inspector	Havildar (Note: Also known as Armed Police Head Constable.)	Armed Police Constable
Abbreviation	APSI	APASI	Hdr.	PC

- In the Armed Police, the titles of Commandant, Deputy Commandant, and Assistant Commandant replace the ranks of Superintendent (SP), Additional Superintendent (Addl.SP), and Deputy Superintendent (DySP) respectively.
- Circle Inspector (CI) is not an official rank but a posting (currently not existing), referring to an Inspector of Police (IP) in charge of a police circle.
- In the Armed Police, the prefix "Armed Police" is used for all ranks (e.g., Armed Police Inspector, Armed Police Sub Inspector, Armed Police Constable), replacing the standard police rank titles.
- The title of Havildar replaces the rank of Head constable in the Armed Police.
- In the Civil Police, the ranks of Constable and Head Constable are designated as Civil Police Officer (CPO) and Senior Civil Police Officer (SCPO), respectively.

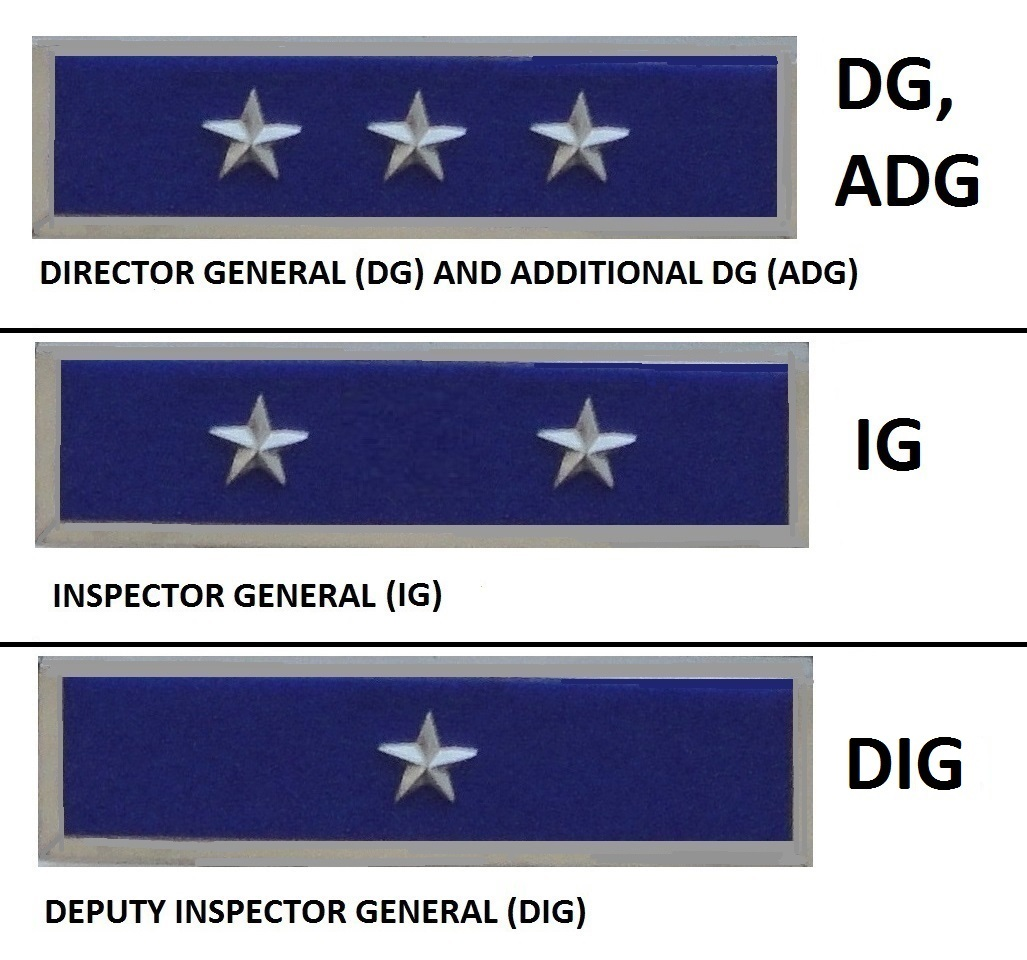
Three Stars on blue background indicates DGP/ADGP rank.

Two Stars on blue background indicates IGP Rank.

One Star on blue background Indicates DIG Rank.

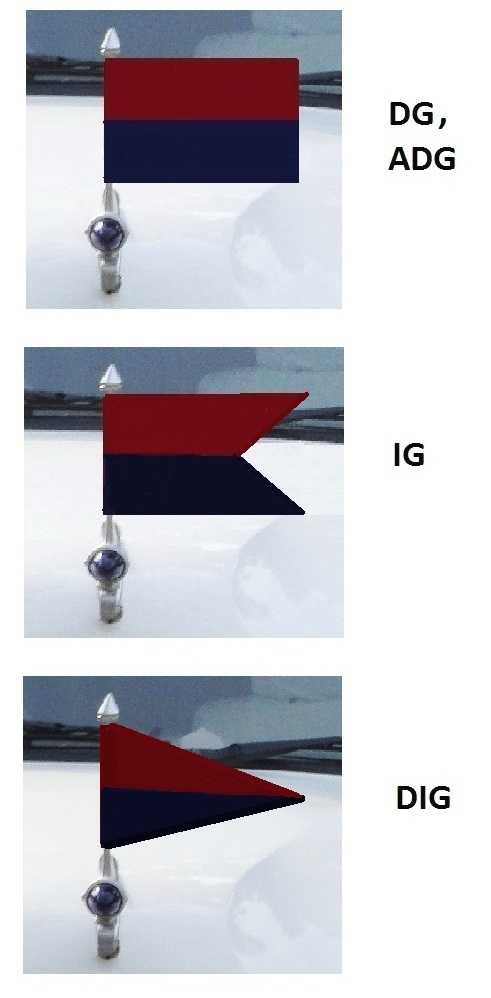
Flags displayed on the official vehicles of senior IPS officers, indicating the officer's rank.

The ranks in the Kerala Police range from Constable to DGP. See: Rank structure.

=== Promotion ===
There is a regular line of promotion based on arising vacancies, contingent on factors such as seniority and eligibility.

Despite meeting educational qualifications, many Civil Police Officers (CPOs) retire with only one or two official promotion during their service. Grade-based designations, while allowing the wearing of higher-rank uniforms and performing related duties, do not reflect in official records or confer actual rank advancement, leading to dissatisfaction among constabulary personnel.

Grade designation:

Certain long-serving police personnel in Kerala Civil Police are designated with honorary ranks such as Sub Inspector (Grade), Assistant Sub Inspector (Grade), and Senior Civil Police Officer (Grade). These officials are permitted to wear the uniform and perform the duties of the higher rank, but for all official, legal, and disciplinary purposes, they are treated as holding their original lower rank. For example, an ASI (Grade) is treated as a Head Constable, and a Senior Civil Police Officer (Grade) as a Civil Police Officer. These grade designations do not affect seniority or pay but provide functional recognition. They will continue to carry the duties and responsibilities of the rank when they receive the honorary grade. Promotion to the regular higher rank is based on seniority and eligibility as determined by the Departmental Promotion Board.

The eligibility criteria for the grade designation as follows;

- Head constable Grade (Senior Civil Police Officer) - 12yrs of service as constable (Civil Police Officer).
- Assistant Sub Inspector (Grade)- 20yrs of service as SCPO.
- Sub Inspector (Grade) - 25yrs of service as ASI.

== Recruitment and Training ==
Recruitment to the Kerala Police is carried out through direct recruitment and promotion, with appointments to different services and ranks governed by the applicable service rules and recruitment regulations. Recruitment to the Indian Police Service (IPS) is conducted through the Union Public Service Commission's Civil Services Examination and through promotion from the Kerala Police Service (KPS). Officers recruited through the Civil Services Examination are allotted to the Kerala cadre and normally begin their field career as Assistant Superintendent of Police(ASP). Promotion of Kerala Police Service officers to the IPS is made in accordance with the Indian Police Service (Appointment by Promotion) Regulations, 1955.

Direct recruitment to the Kerala Police Service may include appointment to the post of Deputy Superintendent of Police (Trainee) through the Kerala Public Service Commission under special recruitment schemes. Recruitment to subordinate ranks such as sub-inspector and police constable are also conducted through the Kerala Public Service Commission.
The PSC conducts direct recruitment to various uniformed police posts, including Sub Inspector (General Executive), Sub Inspector (Armed Police), Civil Police Officer, Police Constable (Armed Police), Police Constable (Telecommunication), Police Constable (Driver) and Police Constable (Commando Wing).

=== Police Training ===
Police training is conducted through the state police training system, including the Kerala Police Academy (KEPA) at Thrissur and the Police Training College (PTC) at Thiruvananthapuram.KEPA provides training for police personnel at various levels, while PTC conducts basic and in-service training and specialised courses for police personnel. The Kerala Police Academy (KePA) functions under a Director, an IGP-ranked senior officer, while the Police Training College functions under a Principal, an SP-ranked officer.

== List of former Police Chiefs of Kerala ==
S.No	Name	Date of Assumption of Charge
Inspector General of Police (IGP)
1	Chandrasekaran Nair	1956 – 1957
2	M Krishna Menon	1957 – 1961
3	KNR Sreenivasan Iyer	1959
4	VP Nair	1961 – 1964
5	N Rama Iyer	1964 – 1967
6	M.Gopalan	1967 – 1972
7	M. Singaravelu	1972 – 1974
8	VN Rajan	1974 – 1978
9	V Subramanian	1980
Director General of Police (DGP)
10	T Anantha Sankara Iyer	1978 — 1982
11	P Vijayan	1982 – 1983
12	MK Joseph	1983 – 1988
13	K John Mathai	1989
14	Raj Gopal Narayan	1988 – 1991
15	AV Venkatachalam	1991
16	C Subramaniam	1991 – 1993
17	R Jayaram Padikkal	1993 – 1994
18	TV Madhusudanan	1994 – 1995
19	KV Rajagopalan Nair	1995 – 1996
20	R Radhakrishanan	1996 – 1997
21	M Adbul Sathar Kunju	05-06-1997 to 30–06–1997
22	CA Chaly	30-06-1997 to 31–03–1998
23	BS Sasthri	31-03-1998 to 25–07–2000
24	PR Chandran	26-07-2000 to 31–05–2001
25	R Padmanabhan	31-05-2001 to 31–10–2001
26	W Joseph Dawson	31-10-2001 to 31–01–2002
27	KJ Joseph	31-01-2002 to 31–05–2003
28	PK Hormese Tharakan	31-05-2003 to 31–01–2005
29	Raman Srivastava	01-02-2005 to 30–11–2008
State Police Chief (SPC)
30	Jacob Punnoose	01-12-2008 to 31–08–2012
31	KS Balasubramanian	01-09-2012 to 31–05–2015
32	TP Senkumar	01-06-2015 to 31–05–2016
33	Lokanath Behera	01-06-2016 to 06–05–2017
34	TP Senkumar	06-05-2017 to 30–06–2017
35	Lokanath Behera	01-07-2017 to 30–06–2021
36	Anil Kant	01-07-2021 to 30–06–2023
37	Sheikh Darvesh Saheb	01-07-2023 to 30–06–2025
38	Ravada Azad Chandrasekhar	01-07-2025 incumbent

== Achievements ==
Kerala Chief Minister Pinarayi Vijayan has termed Kerala Police as best in the country. In 2021 Kerala Police bagged the National e-Governance Award. Kerala Police has achieved several significant milestones over the years. Some of the notable achievements include:

Women Police Stations: Kerala Police was the first in the country to establish women police stations, which exclusively deal with crimes against women.

Cyberdome: Kerala Police established Cyberdome, a state-of-the-art facility for cyber security and cybercrime investigation.

Janamaithri Suraksha: Kerala Police launched the Janamaithri Suraksha Project, a community policing initiative aimed at building a relationship of trust between the police and the public.

Pink Patrol: Kerala Police launched Pink Patrol, a patrol team consisting of women police officers, to ensure the safety and security of women in public places.

- The Public Affairs Index selected Kerala as the best state in 2016 and 2017 considering its excellence in law and order.
- According to the grading conducted by Plan India for Women's Safety, Kerala ranks second in the country in terms of ensuring women's safety (Gender Vulnerability Index).
- Kollam City Police achieved ISO 9001 certification for excellence in office functioning and maintaining high levels of quality control in day-to-day activities in January 2018.
- Valapatnam Police Station has been selected as one of the top ten police stations in the country based on the inspection and study of the Union Ministry of Home Affairs. The handling of criminal cases, effective implementation of anti-drug activities and public involvement of the police helped the Valapatanam police station to achieve this achievement.
- COPS Today International, a journal published by the Foundation for Research, recently honored Kerala Police's Community Policing Program Janmaitri Police Project with the Police Excellence Award.
- Kerala Police's CCTV system was praised by the Supreme Court as exemplary, urging other states to follow.

== Statistics ==
As of 1 January 2024, data published by BPRD, the sanctioned strength of the Kerala Police was 61,692, comprising 50,488 Civil Police, 10,020 Special Armed Police, and 1,184 personnel in India Reserve Battalions (IRB). The actual strength was 54,939, with 46,907 Civil Police, 7,017 Special Armed Police, and 1,015 IRB personnel.

The police-population ratio in Kerala was 172 per lakh population (actual), with civil police alone at 131 per lakh. Each police officer covered approximately 581 people, and one police officer was responsible for 653 km^{2}.

Kerala has 565 sanctioned police stations, and the state maintains good transport facilities with approximately 11 vehicles per 100 police personnel.

The strength of women police in Kerala was 4,334, accounting for about 7.9% of total police personnel.

== Controversies ==
Kerala Police has faced several controversies over the years. Some of the notable controversies include allegations of custodial deaths, where suspects died in police custody, fake encounter killings, where suspects were killed in fake encounters, and police brutality, where suspects were subjected to excessive force during arrest or interrogation.

There have been several allegations of irregularities and brutalities by Kerala Police officials. Kerala Police has been accused of failure in curbing violence and failure to act on intelligence reports.

The Kerala Police was criticized for its failure to control the event of 2014 Kiss of Love protest against moral policing. Police allowed counter-protesters—who included members of Shiv Sena, SDPI, and Bajrang Dal—to attack the protest. Although they attempted to physically stop the Kiss of Love protesters from legally protesting, none of the counter protesters were removed. Police later claimed that they arrested the Kiss of Love protesters to save the protesters' lives.

The Kerala Police staff organisations have occasionally been criticised for functioning like trade unions within a disciplined force. However, supporters argue that they help address the service grievances and welfare of police personnel. However, supporters contend that these organisations serve as representative bodies to address service grievances and welfare issues of police personnel. Currently, the Kerala Police Association, Kerala Police Officers Association, and Kerala Police Senior Officers Association function as the staff organisations representing different ranks in the Kerala Police.

=== Police brutality ===
1. Rajan case (1976), A 1976 custodial torture and death of engineering student P. Rajan during the Emergency, which became a symbol of police brutality in Kerala.
2. Nedumkandam Custodial Death (2019) Rajkumar, a 49-year-old financial agent, died in custody after being allegedly tortured over four days by Idukki police. The incident led to arrests of police officers and judicial inquiry.
3. Varapuzha Custodial Death (2018) In April 2018, 29-year-old Sreejith died allegedly due to police torture in custody at Varapuzha Police Station. He had reportedly been assaulted by officers in plain clothes before being taken into custody.The then District Police Chief (Ernakulam Rural) was also suspended after an initial transfer, but later reinstated. Seven police personnel were suspended, and an unofficial squad called the "Rural Tiger Force"—involved in the incident—was disbanded. All officers were reinstated after eight months based on the SIT report stating that their reinstatement would not affect the investigation.
4. Tanur custodial death case: A man arrested in a drug case at Tanur, Malappuram died in police custody. Police initially claimed he had swallowed a packet containing drugs. The case was first investigated by the State Crime Branch, but after a High Court plea by the family, it was transferred to the CBI, which later arrested four Kerala Police personnel from an unofficial squad.

== See also ==
- Department of Home (Kerala)
- Kerala Vigilance and Anti-Corruption Bureau
- Kerala Prisons and Correctional Services
- Kerala Thunderbolts
- Kerala Motor Vehicles Department
- Kerala Excise
