= Station house officer =

Officer in charge of a police station in India and Pakistan

Insignia of Sub-inspector and Inspector
(L to R)

A station house officer (SHO) is the officer in charge of a police station in India and Pakistan. The Station House Officer (SHO) is a police officer of such rank as may be fixed by the government who is entrusted with the overall supervision of the functions of each police station and that officer shall be the officer in charge of the police station. The SHO holds the rank of inspector or sub-inspector. A station house officer is not a rank, but rather a post or designation. In India, the law permits a station house officer to conduct the investigation of crimes.

As of 1 January 2022, there are a total of 16,955 sanctioned police stations in India. Some police stations in India have Police Inspector as Station House Officer with two or more Sub Inspectors assisting him in Law & Order and Crime control and detection.

Officer-in-charge (OC)

In some states in India, the SHO is also called the Officer-in-charge (OC), mostly in rural areas where a police station is headed by a Sub-inspector of police.

Inspector-in-charge (IC)

Insignia of Inspector-in-Charge in West Bengal Police.

In West Bengal, mostly in urban or semi-urban areas, where a police station is headed by an inspector, is called the Inspector-in-charge (IC)

== Functions ==
The Station House Officer:

- shall maintain law and order within the respective jurisdiction of each police station
- is responsible for the prevention and detection of crimes within the jurisdiction of the police station
- shall ensure timely completion of investigation and submission of Final Report before the Hon’ble Court
- is responsible for the proper functioning and supervision of subordinate police officers of the police station.
- Also to assist District/Local government administration in the case of natural or man made disaster.
