= Gaza tribunal =

Civil society lead international tribunal for Israeli war crimes in Gaza

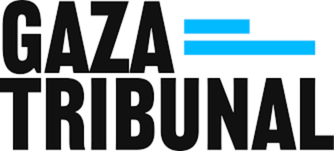
Logo of the Gaza Tribunal

Gaza Tribunal was a People's tribunal, a civil society led initiative to document and investigate Israeli war crimes and the international community's complicity in the Gaza genocide. Organized by a steering committee of international lawyers and human rights advocates, the tribunal aims to build a comprehensive public record of atrocities and advocate for legal accountability through official channels like the International Criminal Court (ICC).

Modelled on the Russell Tribunal, which investigated war crimes during the Vietnam War, the Gaza Tribunal included prominent jurors such as former United Nations Special Rapporteur Richard Falk. It held public sessions in various international cities, including an inaugural session in London in 2024 and public hearings in Sarajevo and Istanbul. While its findings were non-binding, the tribunal concluded that Israel was committing genocide in Gaza and called for the ICC to issue arrest warrants for Israeli officials and for states to impose arms embargoes on Israel.

== Precipitants ==
The Gaza tribunal was headed by former UN Special Rapporteur on Palestinian human rights Richard Falk. The steering committee includes many former UN officials and legal scholars such as Michael Lynk, Hilal Elver, Penny Green, Raji Sourani, and Craig Mokhiber.

Attendees and participants at the various sessions included scholars and activists such as Ilan Pappe, Jeff Halper, Ussama Makdisi, Cornel West, Avi Shlaim, Naomi Klein, Mahmood Mamdani, and Hatem Bazian. The Sarajevo session heard expert testimonies from human rights attorney Noura Erakat and activist Professor Mazin Qumsiyeh. In Istanbul, the jury heard more expert and eye witness testimonies, including those of American journalist Katie Halper, professor Maura Finkelstein, former Biden administration official Lily Greenberg, and participants of the Global Sumud Flotilla.

== Timeline ==
The tribunal convened its first preparatory meeting for two days in London on 3 November 2024, the inaugural session was reportedly attended by over 100 participants. The steering committee met for the first time in London in February 2025. The first public session was held between 26–29 May in Sarajevo, Bosnia and Herzegovina. The session resulted in the Declaration of Sarajevo, in which the tribunal expressed moral outrage at what it described as the genocide and other war crimes of Israel and affirmed a commitment to working with partners across global civil society to end the violence.

The final session of the Tribunal was held at Istanbul University in Istanbul, Turkey from 23 to 26 October 2025. At the end of the session the final verdict was issued stating that "Israel is perpetrating an ongoing genocide against the Palestinian people in Gaza, within—and enabled by—a broader settler-colonial apartheid regime rooted in the supremacist ideology of Zionism".

== See also ==
- People's Tribunal
- War crimes in the 2023 Gaza War
