= SPC =

SPC may refer to:

== Business and law ==
- Segregated portfolio company, a specialized form of offshore company
- Signature panel code, a credit or debit card security code
- Social purpose corporation, a company that considers social issues in its decision making
- Special purpose company, a subsidiary usually created solely for isolating a financial risk, or for financial reporting reasons
- Statistical process control, a method of quality control
- Supplementary protection certificate, a sui generis, patent-like, intellectual property right

== Organisations ==
=== Businesses ===
- Singapore Petroleum Company, a Singapore area oil company
- Southern Pacific Communications, predecessor of American telecommunications provider Sprint Corporation
- Software Publishing Corporation, a former U.S. computer software manufacturer
- Sony Pictures Classics, a speciality division of Sony Pictures Entertainment
- South Park Commons, an American venture capital firm and technology community
- SPC Australia, a brand of jams and tinned goods founded in Shepparton, Victoria, Australia
- SPC Group, a Korean food company from Samlip Group
- Synthetic Plastics Company, a defunct plastics manufacturer that owned many budget-price record labels
- Syrian Petroleum Company, a state-owned oil company
- System Planning Corporation, a U.S. military electronics corporation

=== Churches ===
- Serbian Orthodox Church (Serbian: Српска православна црква, Srpska pravoslavna crkva), an Eastern Orthodox Christian Church
- Southern Presbyterian Church (Australia)

=== Government and politics ===
- Pacific Community, formerly the South Pacific Commission, a Pacific Islands regional intergovernmental organisation
- Supreme Petroleum Council (Kuwait), one of the governmental agencies of Kuwait
- Socialist Party of Canada
- Socialist Party of British Columbia
- Supreme People's Court (disambiguation), highest judicial body in several countries
- Supreme Political Council, governing body in Yemen formed by the Houthi movement and the General People's Congress
- Student Police Cadet Project

=== Schools ===
- San Pedro College, a Catholic institution in Davao City, Philippines
- San Pedro College of Business Administration, a private institute in Laguna, Philippines
- St Patrick's College (disambiguation), various institutions
- Saint Paul's College (disambiguation), various institutions
- St Peter's College (disambiguation), various institutions
- St. Petersburg College, a community college with multiple campuses in Pinellas County, Florida, U.S.
- South Plains College, a community college based in Levelland, Texas

=== Other organizations ===
- Swedish Paralympic Committee, the non-profit organization representing Swedish athletes in the International Paralympic Committee
- Sisters of Charity of St. Paul, Religious congregation founded by St Paul
- Seattle Privacy Coalition, a group of personal privacy and government transparency activists based in Seattle, Washington

== Police and military ==
- Scalable Plate Carrier, a ballistic vest or bullet-resistant vest, often called a bulletproof vest
- Specialist (rank), one of the four junior enlisted ranks in the U.S. Army
- Special Purpose Cartridge, a rifle cartridge developed by Remington and the US military
- Special police constable
- Student Police Cadet Project, a government of Kerala initiative.
- State Police Chief (a.k.a. Director general of police), a rank in the Indian Police Service

== Science and technology ==
- Secure multiparty computation, a cryptography problem introduced in 1982
- Service programming code, a code in most CDMA handsets/mobiles
- Signal peptidase I, an enzyme
- Signaling Point Code, used for SS7 signaling protocol in telephony systems
- Simple point charge, a 3-point water model used in computational chemistry simulations
- Sodium percarbonate, an oxidizing agent used in cleaning products
- Solid phase crystallization, a method to produce polycrystalline silicon
- SPC file format, a file format used in spectroscopy
- SPC700, a processor used for audio in the Super NES hardware
- Stage pin connector, a standard power cable connector
- Statistical process control, a method for achieving quality control in manufacturing processes
- Storage Performance Council, a non-profit corporation founded to define, standardize, and promote storage subsystem benchmarks; see IBM SAN Volume Controller
- Stored program control, a machine control principle that uses a computer to store programs and data
- Storm Prediction Center, a division of NOAA's National Weather Service that forecasts and deals with strong to severe weather events
- Summary of Product Characteristics, the defining information document for medicinal products used in the European Union
- SupraPubic Catheter, used to drain urine from the bladder

== Other ==
- IATA code "SPC" for La Palma Airport, Canary Islands
- Scrabble Players Championship, an annual Scrabble championship event in North America
- South Pacific Championship (1986–1990), a rugby union competition for Australia, New Zealand and Fiji
- Southwest Preparatory Conference, an athletic league in Texas and Oklahoma, US
- Smile Precure!, the ninth installment of the Pretty Cure franchise, released in 2012
- Student Price Card, a loyalty card program in Canada
- Sony Pictures Classics, a specialty film studio owned by Sony.
- Shark Punching Center, a fictional organization

== See also ==
- SPOC (disambiguation)
- SCP (disambiguation)
