= Raji Sourani =

Palestinian human rights lawyer

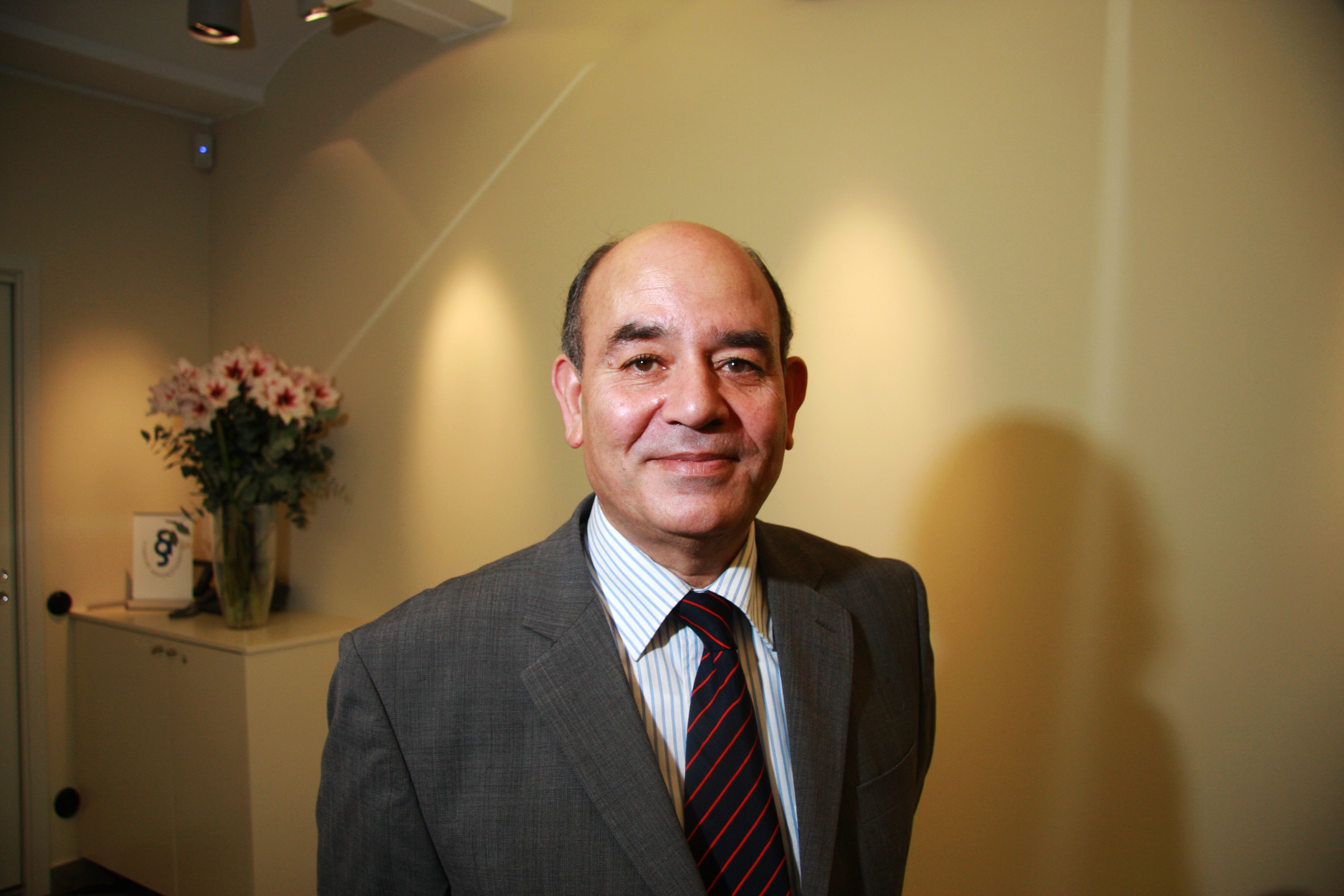
Raji Sourani, 2009

Raji Sourani (Arabic: راجي الصوراني; born 31 December 1953 in Gaza City) is a human rights lawyer, the director of the Palestinian Centre for Human Rights, and a former member of the Popular Front for the Liberation of Palestine.

He was an Amnesty International prisoner of conscience in 1985 and 1988, member of International Commission of Jurists EXCO and IDAL EXCO, and Vice President of the International Federation of Human Rights. He was a recipient of the Robert F Kennedy Human Rights Award in 1991, given each year to an individual whose courageous activism is at the heart of the human rights movement and in the spirit of Robert F. Kennedy's vision and legacy. In 1995, he founded the Palestinian Centre for Human Rights and is its director.

Sourani was active in the cases of Palestinians representing deportation, and in monitoring the conditions of Israeli prisons and detentions. He remains an unreserved critic of human rights violations occurring on both sides of the conflict.

Sourani was selected for the 2003 Oak Institute for Human Rights Fellowship at Colby College in Waterville, Maine. He was denied a permit to exit Gaza to attend a human rights conference in September 2008. Sourani was co-awarded the Right Livelihood Award on September 26, 2013 for "his unwavering dedication to the rule of law and human rights under exceptionally difficult circumstances".

Sourani served "a three-year sentence [1979-1982] imposed by an Israeli court which convicted him of membership in the Popular Front for the Liberation of Palestine, a designated terrorist organization by Israel. He was also denied a US entry visa in 2012. Sourani was imprisoned an additional three times, in 1985 and 1986, and held in administrative detention in 1988. Sourani was named a Prisoner of Conscience by Amnesty International during his 1988 detention. During the Israeli detention Sourani was beaten and subjected to mental and physical torture.

Since the signing of the Declaration of Principles by the Government of Israel and the PLO in 1993, and the establishment of limited Palestinian self-rule, he has advocated strict adherence to international standards for the Israeli government and the Palestinian Authority. In his principled stance, he has won respect and recognition by international organizations for his work.

As leader of the Arab Organization for Human Rights, Sourani organized the first mission of human rights observers after the overthrow of Muammar al-Gaddafi in Libya in 2011 and trained lawyers and human rights advocates in Syria.

In 2014 he said that had been in the ranks of the Popular Front for the Liberation of Palestine.

In October 2023, at the onset of the Gaza war, Sourani was living with his family in the Tel al-Hawa district of Gaza City. Shortly after he had given an interview to Democracy Now!'s Amy Goodman, on October 22 Israel blew up his two-storey home with a 900 kilograms (2,000 lb) bomb, He believes he was targeted and, while insisting on staying, was persuaded by others to exit the Gaza Strip to protect his life. From his 65 colleagues from the Palestinian Center for Human Rights, two young lawyers were killed. Sourani eventually managed to flee to Paris, where he assessed the role and limits of the international justice system to affect the war devastating Gaza.

In November 2024 Raji Sourani was - with Richard Falk, Ahmet Köroğlu, Hilal Elver, Lara Elborno, Penny Green, Wesam Ahmad, Craig Mokhiber - a member of the Gaza Tribunal steering committee, a people's tribunal established in London as an independent initiative with humanitarian and moral objectives to investigate Israel's war crimes in Gaza.

In January 2025 Sourani was nominated for the Nobel Peace Prize by Assoc. Professor James Mehigan of Canterbury University.

In September 2025 Sourani's organization, the Palestinian Centre for Human Rights, announced that its head office had been destroyed in the attack on al Roya tower in Gaza city.
