= International State Crime Initiative =

Interdisciplinary community of scholars

- Abbreviation: ISCI
- Formation: October 2011
- Type: Academic research institute
- Location: London, United Kingdom
- Co-Director's: Professor Penny Green and Dr Tony Ward
- Parent organization: Harvard University, University of Hull, University of Ulster
- Website: www.statecrime.org

The International State Crime Initiative (ISCI) is a community of scholars working to expose, document, explain, and resist state crime. As an interdisciplinary forum for research, reportage and debate, ISCI aims to combine rigorous academic research with emancipatory activism.

ISCI is based at Queen Mary University of London, one of its four partner institutions. The others are the University of Hull, Ulster University and the Harvard Humanitarian Initiative. ISCI was previously based at King's College London, until 1 September 2014.

== History ==
Despite being subject to scrutiny by a variety of disciplines, state crime has traditionally been ignored by criminology. ISCI's founders, Professor Penny Green and Dr Tony Ward, remarked in 2005, that "considering the contribution of state agencies to the world's homicide rates and the scale of their economic crimes, the space devoted to state crime in the literature of our discipline remains pitifully small" (Green and Ward 2005: 432). Green, Ward, and a group of graduate students at King's were joined by colleagues at Harvard and the University of Ulster in the initiative, which was launched in June 2010 at King's College London, with a keynote address by The Independent's Middle East correspondent, Robert Fisk. During his address, "State of Denial: A Reporter in the Middle East", Fisk challenged the supposedly impartial reporting espoused by international media outlets such as the BBC. Fisk's lecture was followed by a photography and video exhibition by Yusuf Sayman, a New York/Istanbul based photographer whose photojournalism investigates the relationship between the individual and the state.

== People ==
ISCI is coordinated by an executive board drawn from its four partner institutions. It has three honorary fellows; Noam Chomsky, John Pilger, and Richard Falk. ISCI's research fellows, researchers, and friends all contribute to its research activities.

== Journal ==
Many of ISCI's prominent associates currently sit on the board of ISCI's scholarly journal State Crime, which was launched in October 2011 at King's College London by ISCI honorary fellow, Noam Chomsky. State Crime is the first peer-reviewed, interdisciplinary and international journal dedicated to state crime scholarship.

The journal's focus is a reflection of the growing awareness within criminology that state criminality is endemic and acts as a significant barrier to security and development. Topics covered by the journal include, torture; genocide and other forms of government and politically organised mass killing; war crimes; state-corporate crime; state-organised crime; natural disasters exacerbated by government (in)action; asylum and refugee policy and practice; state terror; political and economic corruption; and resistance to state violence and corruption.

State Crime is published twice yearly by Pluto Journals, the first edition having been published in April 2012.

== Research ==
=== ESRC project ===
In 2011, ISCI was awarded £830,000 by the United Kingdom's Economic and Social Research Council (ESRC) for a project entitled, ‘Resisting State Crime: A Comparative Study of Civil Society’ (ES/I030816/1). The project aims to study the role of civil society organisations in defining, censuring and resisting criminal acts committed, instigated or condoned by state agencies. It is a cross-cultural, comparative study which focuses on countries which are all undergoing processes of reconstruction following severe violent conflict, but which have very different levels of economic and political development. The project will explore the ‘life histories’ of a range of grass roots civil society organisations dedicated to challenging state violence and corruption. The study compares Burma, Colombia, Papua New Guinea, Sierre Leone, Tunisia, and Turkey. Progress of the research can be monitored here.

In 2014, ISCI was awarded £200,000 by the ESRC under its 'Pilot Urgency Grants Mechanism'.

=== E-Pedagogy ===
ISCI has also been awarded funding by King's College, London and the Pluto Education Trust, to build an interactive website devoted to state crime studies. It will feature multi-media case studies developed by leading experts in the field, including Dr Chris Williams on working children in South Africa, Dr Hazel Cameron on the role of Britain and France in the Rwandan genocide, Peter Low on exploitation of mineral resources in Peru, Dr Kristian Lasslett on state corporate crime in Bougainville, and Thomas MacManus on Trafigura's dumping of toxic waste in Ivory Coast.

== Events ==
=== Researching State Crime Methods Workshop ===
In April 2011, ISCI held a Research Methods Workshop at King's College, London. The workshop brought together international scholars from criminology, anthropology, international relations and sociology to explore, analyse and challenge the methodologies available to scholars of state criminality. The participants discussed the peculiar difficulties and successes of securing access to both authoritarian elites and vulnerable victims, negotiating translators, government minders, researcher uses of deception, the relationship between method and theory, and ethnographic experiences.

=== ISCI's launch event ===
In June 2013, The Independent's Middle East correspondent, Robert Fisk launched ISCI along with Yusuf Sayman, a New York-based photographer, who also held a photography and video exhibition. Fisk's lecture was entitled ‘State of Denial: A Reporter in the Middle East’ and covered a wide range of material on the recent and distant history of the Middle East, US and British policy in the region, the role of journalism in uncovering truth and the yearning of all peoples for the justice they are denied.
