= People's Court =

People's Court may refer to:

== East Asia ==
- Supreme People's Court, the highest court of the People's Republic of China
  - Local people's courts of the People's Republic of China
- Local Courts of Vietnam, also known as People's Courts, which deal with legal issues at the district precinct levels

== Eastern Europe ==
- People's Court (Soviet Union), a civil court of the Soviet Union
- People's Court (Bulgaria), a temporary court that was established by the Fatherland Front in Bulgaria and active in 1944–1945

== Germany ==
- People's Court (Germany), a court established by Adolf Hitler to deal with those accused of political offences
- People's Court (Bavaria), a Bavarian court from 1918 to 1924 that tried Adolf Hitler and other Beer Hall Putsch conspirators

== North Africa ==
- Libyan People's Court, an emergency tribunal founded in Libya after the coup of 1 September 1969 to try officials of the Kingdom era

== Entertainment ==
- The People's Court, the first widely popular American "court show" in which actual small claims court cases were heard by a pseudo-judicial arbitrator
- La Corte del Pueblo, the Spanish-language version of The People's Court that aired on the Telemundo network

== Geography ==
- People's Court, Penang, a public housing project in George Town, Malaysia

== See also ==
- Supreme People's Court (disambiguation)
- Court of public opinion
- Kangaroo court
- People’s Tribunal (disambiguation)
