= State violence =

Violence of a government against its citizens

State violence is the use of force, intimidation, or oppression by a government against its citizens. State violence can happen through law enforcement or military force, as well as through other branches of government and bureaucracy. State violence is often justified by regimes under the pretext of maintaining law and order.

== Forms ==
=== State sponsored genocide ===
Genocide generally involves the direct mass killing of members of a national, ethnical, racial or religious group. Perpetrators of genocide are most often state actors.

=== State surveillance ===
Government surveillance is a tool used by government agencies to protect citizens from potential attacks from terrorists, extremists, or dissidents. Surveillance methods can include monitoring phone calls, video surveillance, or tracking internet usage. Although surveillance was designed to protect national security, it has the potential to perpetuate state violence. The use of surveilling technology can be used to encroach upon citizens' civil liberties and right to privacy.

== Examples ==
=== Myanmar ===
After attacks on police and army posts in Myanmar by Rohingya militias, state security forces carried out a string of mass killings of Rohingya civilians that killed thousands of people and led more than 700,000 to flee the country. Myanmar has officially rejected the U.N's claim that their army participated in the 2017 Rohingya Genocide, despite evidence released by the U.N. Human Rights Council.

=== United States ===
After the terrorist attacks on September 11, 2001, President George W. Bush signed the Patriot Act; this Act allowed for an expansion of surveillance by the government and law enforcement. In 2008, U.S. Congress passed the FISA Amendment Act that gave government agencies, such as the NSA, unfettered access to private communications of foreigners. Section 702 of the FISA Amendment Act allows for government agencies to collect information from private companies like AT&T, Google, and Facebook to target non- U.S. citizens. In some instances, this permission includes communications between a non-citizen and a U.S. citizen. The FBI has been known to use these databases to search for information on U.S. citizens in a process called “backdoor searches”.

== See also ==
- State terrorism
- State-sponsored terrorism
- Political violence
- Monopoly on violence
- State crime
