= Chelembra bank robbery =

Bank robbery in India

The Chelambra bank robbery in the Malappuram district of Kerala, India is considered to be one of the biggest and most sensational bank robberies in the crime history of Kerala. In the early hours of 30 December 2007, the robbers made a hole in the floor of the Kerala Gramin Bank and took away 80 kilograms of gold and 5 million Indian rupees, for an overall heist worth 80 million rupees.

== Robbery ==
The bank was on the first floor of a building. The ground floor had a restaurant that was up for rent. The four-member gang rented the restaurant by giving an advance payment of about Rs. 50,000. They shut down the front door and placed a board saying that it was under renovation and would reopen on 8 January 2008. To make things more convincing, they even bought new furniture for the restaurant and much construction material for the site. They also covered up the windows with newspapers to avoid being suspicious.

Those who were watching the scene would have thought that repairs were going on. But they were cracking the first floor open, where the strong room was kept. They made a hole in the ceiling to the strong room where they took the money from iron safes that they cut open using a gas cutting machine. They took away gold and cash kept inside the safe.

== Investigations by Kerala Police ==
The Kerala Police quickly formed a number of special teams. A special team led by Malappuram Superintendent of Police P. Vijayan and Deputy Superintendent K K Ibrahim conducted the investigation under the supervision of K.S. Jangpangi the Additional Director General of Kerala Police. The team consisted of Circle Inspectors of Police Vikraman and M.P Mohanachandran, SI Anvar Hussain and other officers from the subordinate ranks . It was a challenging task for Kerala Police to begin investigation as there was no evidence and no leads available for them to proceed with. Like many other bank robberies, it was done at the wee hours of a Sunday, since that is a bank holiday and the crime had come to light only on the next day.

However, police made a computer graphic sketch image of the main culprit as illustrated by eyewitnesses and neighbors. The criminals tried to create an impression of Naxalite involvement in the robbery by quoting a sentence Jai Mao (praising Naxalism) at the scene of the crime to deviate enquiry. There were many attempts by the culprits to divert the whole attention of the investigation team to Hyderabad. According to police officials, the criminals had purposely left one kilogram of looted gold in a hotel room in Hyderabad and made telephone calls from many different cities of India to mislead the investigation.

The police team also monitored all telephone calls in the closest mobile signal towers at the location of the crime during the midnight hours of the incident. That amounted to monitoring more than two million calls. The help of various mobile service providers and IT professionals was also enlisted for the probe.

And finally, it was the identification of a secret phone number used by the main suspects to communicate between themselves, that proved to be the turning point in the investigation.

=== Arrests ===
The police team finally zeroed in on a house in Kozhikode where the accused were hiding and arrested four people including Joseph alias Jaison alias Babu, the kingpin of the operation along with three others including a woman and recovered 80% of the stolen gold and money. It is the first recovery in the crime history of Kerala of so much stolen property. The police further said that the remaining items would be traced within days as the accused have already confessed their location. The official arrest was formally announced on 28 February 2008 by K S Jangpangi, the additional director general of Kerala police.

It is widely considered to be a credit to Kerala police that they solved the biggest robbery in the state within a short period and with the first recovery of so much stolen property.

== In popular culture ==
=== Crime inspired by Dhoom ===
The leader confessed that the crime was inspired by the Bollywood film Dhoom. In the film, robbers make a hole in the ground floor of a bank and get away with the valuables during the New Year event. But the plan did not go as planned as the dynamites used to blow off the ceiling did not deal any damage.

=== Books and film adaptation ===
The robbery has been written in detail by author Anirban Bhattacharyya in the book India's Money Heist: The Chelembra Bank Robbery which he co-wrote with IG of Kerala, P. Vijayan, published by Penguin Random House in 2022. In August 2022, it was reported that the book's film adaptation right have been sold, with Mohanlal playing the role of the officer P. Vijayan, while Fahadh Faasil would play criminal Babu. The book was translated into Malayalam and published by Mathrubhumi Books as Chelembra Bank Kavarcha.

In 2023, the film Kolla starring Rajisha Vijayan and Priya Prakash Varrier is loosely based on the robbery.
