= State crime =

Failures to acts that break the state's own criminal law or public international law

State crimes are crimes committed on behalf of or with the connivance of governments. The investigation and prosecution of such crimes is made more difficult by a number of circumstances.

== Criminology ==
In criminology, state crime is activity or failures to acts that break the state's own criminal law or public international law. For these purposes Ross (2000b) defines a "state" as the elected and appointed officials, the bureaucracy, and the institutions, bodies and organizations comprising the apparatus of the government. Initially, the state was the agency of deterrence, using the threat of punishment as a utilitarian tool to shape the behaviour of its citizens. Then, it became the mediator, interpreting society's wishes for conflict resolution. Theorists then identified the state as the "victim" in victimless crimes. Now theorists are examining the role of the state as one of the possible perpetrators of crime (Ross, 2000b) whether directly or in the context of state-corporate crime.

Green & Ward (2004) adopt Max Weber's thesis of a sovereign "state" as claiming a monopoly on the legitimate use of force. Thus, the criteria for determining whether a state is "deviant" will draw on international norms and standards of behaviour for achieving the state's usual operating goals. One of those standards will be whether the state respects human rights in the exercise of its powers. But, one of the definitional difficulties is that the states themselves define what is criminal within their own territories, and as sovereign powers, they are not accountable to the international community unless they submit to international jurisdiction generally, or criminal jurisdiction in particular.

== Internal criminal law ==
This is also the case in the rule of law. One of the key issues is the extent to which, if at all, state crime can be controlled. Often state crimes are revealed by an investigative news agency resulting in scandals but, even among first world democratic states, it is difficult to maintain genuinely independent control over the criminal enforcement mechanisms and few senior officers of the state are held personally accountable.

When the citizens of second and third world countries which may be of a more authoritarian nature, seek to hold their leaders accountable, the problems become more acute. Public opinion, media attention, and public protests, whether violent or nonviolent, may all be criminalised as political crimes and suppressed, while critical international comments are of little real value.

In dictatorships and states that do not meet the requirements of the rule of law, there are far greater opportunities for State crime, since the protective mechanisms of the rule of law do not exist. There is therefore typically only a possibility of prosecuting these crimes when there has been a change of regime. A major problem here is that government crimes in dictatorships are typically not criminalized by the national criminal law in force at the time (and set by the dictatorship itself): for this reason, reference is often made to outlawing certain serious crimes such as genocide or crimes against humanity under international law.

== International criminal law ==
As international crimes, a state may engage in state terror and terrorism, torture] war crimes, and genocide. Both internationally and nationally, there may be corruption, state-corporate crime, and organized crime.

Within its territorial borders, some crimes are either the result of situations where the state is not the direct criminal actor, e.g. arising from natural disasters or through the agency of bodies such as the police. More usually, the state is directly involved in excessive secrecy and cover-ups, disinformation, and unaccountability (including tax evasion by officials) which often reflect upper-class and nonpluralistic interests, and infringe human rights (Ross, 2000a).

=== Indirect effect from abroad ===
Barak (1991) examines recent history through Reaganism and Thatcherism which led to a decline in the provision of social services and an increase in public security functions: in turn, this could have increased the opportunity for injustices and state crimes involving the suppression of democratic functions within the state. As Johns and Johnson (1994) note, "The concern of the U.S. policy elites is not, therefore, with the establishment or protection of democracy; it is with the establishment of capitalism world-wide and with the unimpeded control of resources and markets" (p7) "Panama is an especially good example of how the rollback strategy involves subverting or overthrowing not only governments that are socialist or left-wing but the governments of countries that seek full independence from the economic, political, or military influence of the United States" (pp9/10) But, in terms of accountability, they argue that the coverage of the invasion demonstrated "just how subservient the corporate media had become to the political elite in the United States" (p63) Hence, even in democratic countries, it can be difficult to hold political leaders accountable, whether politically or legally, because access to reliable factual information can be limited.

Within the context of state-corporate crime, Green and Ward (2004) examine how the debt repayment schemes in developing countries place such a financial burden on states that they often collude with corporations offering prospects of capital growth. Such collusion frequently entails the softening of environmental and other regulations. The debt service obligation can also exacerbate political instability in countries where the legitimacy of state power is questioned. Such political volatility leads states to adopt clientelistic or patrimonialist patterns of governance, fostering organized crime, corruption, and authoritarianism. In some third world countries, this political atmosphere has encouraged repression and the use of torture. Exceptionally, genocide has occurred.

== See also ==
- Atrocity crimes
- Civilian victimization
- State violence
- International State Crime Initiative
