= Palestinian Centre for Human Rights =

Independent human rights organization in Palestine

- المركز الفلسطيني لحقوق الإنسان
- Formation: April 1995; 31 years ago
- Founder: Raji Sourani
- Founded at: Gaza City
- Coordinates: 31°31′36.89″N 34°26′20.07″E
- Region served: Palestine
- Official language: English, Arabic
- Website: pchrgaza.org/en

The Palestinian Centre for Human Rights (PCHR, Arabic: المركز الفلسطيني لحقوق الإنسان) is a Palestinian human rights organization based in Gaza City. It was founded in 1995 by Raji Sourani, who is its director. It was established by a group of Palestinian lawyers and human rights activists and receives funding from governmental, non-governmental, and religious sources.

The PCHR was set up in April 1995 to monitor and document the practices of Israeli military forces in the Gaza Strip, and the rest of the Occupied Palestinian Territories. The PCHR describes its objective as to monitor and document "human rights violation committed by the Israeli military forces and other abuses associated with Israel's continuing legal and absolute occupation of the Gaza Strip and West Bank, including East Jerusalem".

== Principles and philosophy ==
PCHR states on its website that its founding principles are to:

- Protect human rights and promote the rule of law in accordance with international standards.
- Create and develop democratic institutions and an active civil society, while promoting democratic culture within Palestinian society.
- Support all the efforts aimed at enabling the Palestinian people to exercise its inalienable rights in regard to self-determination and independence in accordance with international Law and UN resolutions.

In its philosophy statement, PCHR repudiates the Oslo Accords as 'fatally flawed' and adds:

Moreover, the Oslo accords failed to address the essential elements of the Palestinian question—the right to self-determination, the right to an independent Palestinian state with its capital in Jerusalem, the right of return for Palestinian refugees and the removal of Israeli settlements from the OPT. In light of this wide-ranging disregard for the human rights of the Palestinian people, the Centre resolved to continue its work to protect human rights from ongoing violations by the Israeli Occupation Forces (IOF).

PCHR has repeatedly called for a ban on capital punishment in the Palestinian territories, which is supported by a majority of Palestinians. It has also released reports relating to violence in the Palestinian territories and Israel.

== Affiliations ==
PCHR has consultative and affiliative status with a number of Arab, European and United Nations organizations. PCHR and Public Committee Against Torture in Israel jointly received the 1996 French Republic Award on Human Rights. In 2002 it received the Bruno Kreisky Award for Outstanding Achievements in the Area of Human Rights.

== Funding ==
According to the PCHR site's funding page, most of the centre's funding comes from the Sweden Chapter of the International Commission of Jurists, the Ford Foundation (USA), NOVIB (Holland), Open Society Fund (USA), Christian Aid (UK), Dan Church Aid in Denmark, Grassroots International (USA), European Commission, Irish Aid in Ireland, Kvinna Till Kvinna in Sweden, Al Quds Association Malaga in Spain, the Royal Danish Representative Office, and the Representative Office of Norway.

PCHR has received funding from the UN Office of the High Commissioner for Human Rights to support the establishment of a Women and Group Rights' Unit.

== Actions ==
In their report titled "Impunity for US Peace Activist's Death" that contains eyewitness testimonies for Rachel Corrie's disputable death case, on 30 June 2003, PCHR declared they have "submitted more than 1200 complaints to the Israeli occupying forces regarding human rights violations since the beginning of the current Intifada. In no case in which PCHR has submitted a complaint, has any individual in the Israeli occupying forces, security services or other persons, been prosecuted or otherwise disciplined for any act perpetrated against a Palestinian or foreign national. PCHR asserts that the State of Israel should be aware that where it fails in its specific legal obligations to conduct full and fair investigations into human rights violations, and bring those responsible to justice in accordance with international law, victims of Israeli war crimes may seek alternative judicial remedies abroad, including under the principle of universal jurisdiction."

The PCHR condemned the Israeli government for allowing "Jewish settler groups to enter the yards of the al-Aqsa Mosque in occupied East Jerusalem" and for using excessive force against Palestinians attempting to "prevent the provocative entry of settlers into the Mosque."

In 2011 the PCHR criticized a decision by Hamas prohibiting a group of seven high school students from leaving Gaza in order to spend a year studying in the United States. The American nonprofit Amideast had awarded the students special scholarships for the program. A Hamas minister explained that "A 15-year-old girl cannot spend a year in America without a supervisor."

In August 2025, the PCHR released a report concluding that Israel has been committing genocide in Gaza.

== YouTube deleted their videos ==
On 5 November 2025, The Intercept reported, "YouTube Quietly Erased More Than 700 Videos Documenting Israeli Human Rights Violations", adding, "The tech giant deleted the accounts of three prominent Palestinian human rights groups — a capitulation to Trump sanctions." The three included the Palestinian Centre for Human Rights along with Al-Haq and Al Mezan Center for Human Rights.

== Raji Sourani ==
Raji Sourani is the director of PCHR. He was denied a permit to exit Gaza to attend a human rights conference in September 2008.

== See also ==
- Al-Haq
- Public Committee Against Torture in Israel
