= The Journal (student newspaper) =

Newspaper for multiple schools in Edinburgh

- Type: Fortnightly newspaper
- Format: Tabloid
- Owner: The Edinburgh Journal Ltd.
- Editor: Unknown
- Founded: 2007
- Political alignment: None
- Ceased publication: 2015
- Headquarters: Holyrood Road, Edinburgh
- Price: Free

The Journal was an independent, fortnightly, local newspaper originally produced by students at seven major higher and further education institutes in Edinburgh. It was distributed at a number of locations across the city's universities and colleges, as well as at bars and cafés throughout the Scottish capital.

A lawyer from Grant Thornton LLP was appointed Interim Liquidator of The Edinburgh Journal Ltd by interlocutor of the Sheriff of Lothian and Borders at Edinburgh Sheriff Court on 23 July 2015 and a creditors meeting was held on 18 August 2015. According to The Herald (Glasgow), The Journal ceased to trade in the first half of 2015, a winding up petition was lodged following non-payment of debts and the liquidator hopes to achieve the best outcome for 'creditors and other stakeholders'.

== Background ==
The Journal was inaugurated in November 2007 as an independent newspaper aimed primarily at students attending seven higher education institutes in the city: the University of Edinburgh, Napier University, Heriot-Watt University, Queen Margaret University, Edinburgh College of Art, Telford College and Stevenson College. The publication covered a variety of topics including local news and events, academic developments, national student news, and national politics, as well as university and professional sport across Edinburgh. It also included sections of commentary and feature writing, alongside reviews of local arts events. The publication was independent of all its target institutions, and was not affiliated with their associated students' unions. The publication was funded through advertising sales and subscriptions.

The Journal printed and distributed around 10,000 copies each fortnight throughout the academic year. Latterly it was printed by Mortons of Horncastle in tabloid format, the publication was originally produced as a Berliner, making it the first and only UK student newspaper to have published issues in this size.

== Organisation ==
The paper was managed by a board of directors comprising three former staff members of the University of Edinburgh's newspaper, Student. A non-sabbatical editor oversaw production, while a general manager administered advertising and arranged additional sources of funding. Five deputy editors were responsible for the various sections of the publication, while content was submitted by students attending institutions in Edinburgh as well as prominent local and national journalists, politicians and commentators. Past contributors included Scottish First Minister, Alex Salmond, two-time journalist of the year, Phillip Knightley, and UN special investigator, Richard A. Falk. The staff also included a number of award-winning student journalists.

== Website ==
Alongside the printed issue, The Journal provided a website to which content—including news updates, match reports and arts reviews— was added regularly. The website was relaunched in October 2008 with an improved design and additional features including an archive of the newspaper's past issues. It has now been closed down.

== Awards ==
Since its inception in November 2007, The Journal had won two national awards and had received nominations for a total of eight honours.

=== NUS Scotland Awards ===
Winner: Best Student Media Award 2012

Winner: Student Journalist of the Year 2012 - Olivia Pires

Winner: Student Journalist of the Year 2013 - Gareth Llewellyn

Winner: Student Journalist of the Year 2014 - John Hewitt Jones

=== Scottish Student Journalism Awards 2012 ===
Winner: Student Publication of the Year

Winner: Multimedia Publication of the Year

Winner: News Story of the Year - Alan Robertson

Winner: Scoop of the Year - Alan Robertson

Winner: Journalist of the Year - Alan Robertson

=== The Herald Student Press Awards ===
Winner: Best New Media

Highly Commended: Best Newspaper

=== The Guardian Student Media Awards ===
Winner: Publication Design of the Year

Nominated: Student Newspaper of the Year

Nominated: Student Publication Design of the Year

Nominated: Student Reporter of the Year - Miles Johnson

=== Scottish Magazine Awards ===
Periodical Publishers Association, Scotland

Nominated: Best Magazine, Small Publishing Company

Nominated: Editor of the Year, Consumer Magazine - Ben Judge

== Competition ==
The Journal was distributed alongside two existing student newspapers, both of which are distributed to single institutions: the University of Edinburgh's The Student and Napier University's Veritas.

At the University of Edinburgh, the publication was initially refused permission to distribute inside university buildings by the Edinburgh University Students' Association, which cited concerns that the new publication may overlap editorially with the existing newspaper, The Student. However, following a large majority vote by students at the union's general meeting, February 2008, this decision was overturned. The Journal currently enjoys full distribution rights across the University of Edinburgh, as well as at the four further target institutions.
