= Kolla (2023 film) =

2023 Malayalam film by Suraj Varma

- Theatrical release poster
- Directed by: Suraj Varma
- Written by: Jasim Jalal; Nelson Joseph
- Story by: Bobby–Sanjay
- Produced by: Rajeesh K.V.
- Starring: Rajisha Vijayan; Priya Prakash Varrier; Vinay Forrt; Alencier Ley Lopez
- Cinematography: Rajavel Mohan
- Edited by: Arju Benn
- Music by: Shaan Rahman
- Production companies: Rajeesh Productions; Ravi Mathew Productions
- Distributed by: Ayyappan Movies Release
- Release date: 9 June 2023
- Running time: 123 minutes
- Country: India
- Language: Malayalam

Kolla (transl. Robbery) is a 2023 Indian Malayalam-language heist film directed by Suraj Varma in his directorial debut and written by Jasim Jalal and Nelson Joseph, based on a story by Bobby–Sanjay. The film stars Rajisha Vijayan and Priya Prakash Varrier in the lead roles. The film is loosely based on the 2008 Chelembra bank robbery in Malappuram district of Kerala.

The film was announced in May 2022. Principal photography commenced the same month in Ettumanoor and wrapped in June 2022. The music was composed by Shaan Rahman, and the cinematography and editing handled by Rajavel Mohan and Arju Benn, respectively.

Kolla was released in theatres on 9 June 2023.

== Plot ==
Annie and Shilpa plan to open a beauty parlour, but are short on funds. Posing as workers, they decide to rob the co-operative bank next door. With the help of Stephen, a friend of Annie's father, they successfully execute their plan.

Police Inspector Farooq Rahman launches an investigation, and suspects Annie and Shilpa. His investigation leads him to CI Stephen, a former policeman turned thief, who suddenly dies of a heart attack while being questioned. Annie goes to the spot where Stephen was supposed to have hidden the stolen money but finds it empty.

Annie searches for the money, using hints from her conversations with Stephen and the information she obtained from Stephen's wife. She eventually finds the money in a burial chamber at a church.

Farooq is convinced that Annie and Shilpa were involved in the robbery and sets a trap to catch them. Meanwhile, another local thief, Stephen's brother-in-law, chases Annie and threatens her. She goes to Farooq's house to cut his niece's hair. Farooq finds Annie there and exposes her lie. He demands half the looted money in return for keeping quiet. Annie agrees and gives him the agreed share.

The next day, Farooq reveals to the public Annie's involvement in the robbery, despite their agreement. Annie and Shilpa flee, but are caught, leading to their arrest.

Farooq is praised by the locals, but appears upset. In a flashback, it is revealed that Annie and Shilpa suspected that Farooq might cheat them, and they had followed Farooq to find where he had hidden his share of the money. They planned Shilpa's arrest, so that Farooq's share of the money could be given to Annie. Three years later, Annie and Shilpa now work as waitresses at a cafe in a new city and plan to rob an adjacent diamond shop.

== Cast ==
- Rajisha Vijayan as Annie
- Priya Prakash Varrier as Shilpa
- Vinay Forrt as CI Basheer Rahman
- Kollam Sudhi as Mesthiri
- Jordi Poonjar as Scaria
- Vinod Kedamangalam as Satheeshan Mundamkunnu, a panchayat member
- Dain Davis as Sugeeth
- Shebin Benson as Basil
- Prem Prakash as Bank Manager
- Alencier Ley Lopez as Stephen (Appappan)
- Jeo Baby as SI Victor
- Alexander Prasanth as Charlie, Stephen's brother-in-law
- Shaan Rahman as Kottayam Rural SP Azeez
- Shiny T. Rajan as Nancy, Stephen's wife

== Production ==
=== Development ===
The film was officially announced on 12 May 2022 at the Gokulam Convention Centre in Kaloor. Sibi Malayil lit the Nilavilakku and launched the film's title.

=== Filming ===
Principal photography began on 13 May 2022 in Ettumanoor. Filming took place in Ettumanoor, Kaipuzha, and Vayala. Filming wrapped on 23 June 2022.

== Soundtrack ==
Kolla

Soundtrack album by Shaan Rahman
- Released: 2023
- Genre: Feature film soundtrack
- Length: 7:13
- Language: Malayalam
- Label: Saina Music

Shaan Rahman chronology
Neymar (2023)	Kolla (2023)	King of Kotha (2023)

The soundtrack is composed by Shaan Rahman.

Track listing
No.	Title	Lyrics	Singer(s)	Length
1.	"Aaraanu Naam"	Vinayak Sasikumar	Priya Prakash Varrier	3:58
2.	"The Heist Song"	Nelson	Aathira Nair	3:15
Total length:				7:13

== Release ==
=== Theatrical ===
The film was released in theatres on 9 June 2023.

=== Home media ===
ManoramaMAX bought the digital distribution rights of the film. The film began streaming on 27 July 2023.

== Reception ==
=== Critical response ===
Sanjith Sidhardhan of OTTPlay gave the film 3 out of 5 stars and wrote, "While the heist and its planning are given limited time, it's what happens after one of them gets caught that makes the proceedings gripping." Arjun Ramachandran of The South First gave 3 out of 5 stars and wrote, "Jasim Jalal and Nelson's screenplay keeps the film engaging, especially the cat-and-mouse game between the lead characters and cops." Anandu Suresh of The Indian Express gave 2 out of 5 stars and wrote, "Despite having an intriguing plot, Suraj Varma's Kolla disappointingly plunges into the depths of mediocrity due to the absence of a compelling and enthralling narrative."

Shilpa Nair Anand of The Hindu wrote, "Kolla is a thriller which, despite a great story with more twists than a murukku, never reaches its full potential." Princy Alexander of Onmanorama wrote, "The screenplay by Jasim Jalal and Nelson Joseph failed to do justice to Bobby-Sanjay's story. The twists were quite intriguing, but some of the scenes needed to be sharper to seem more convincing. Nevertheless, it was fascinating how some of the scenes were envisaged."
