= P. Vijayan =

Indian Police Officer

Additional director general of police P. Vijayan IPS
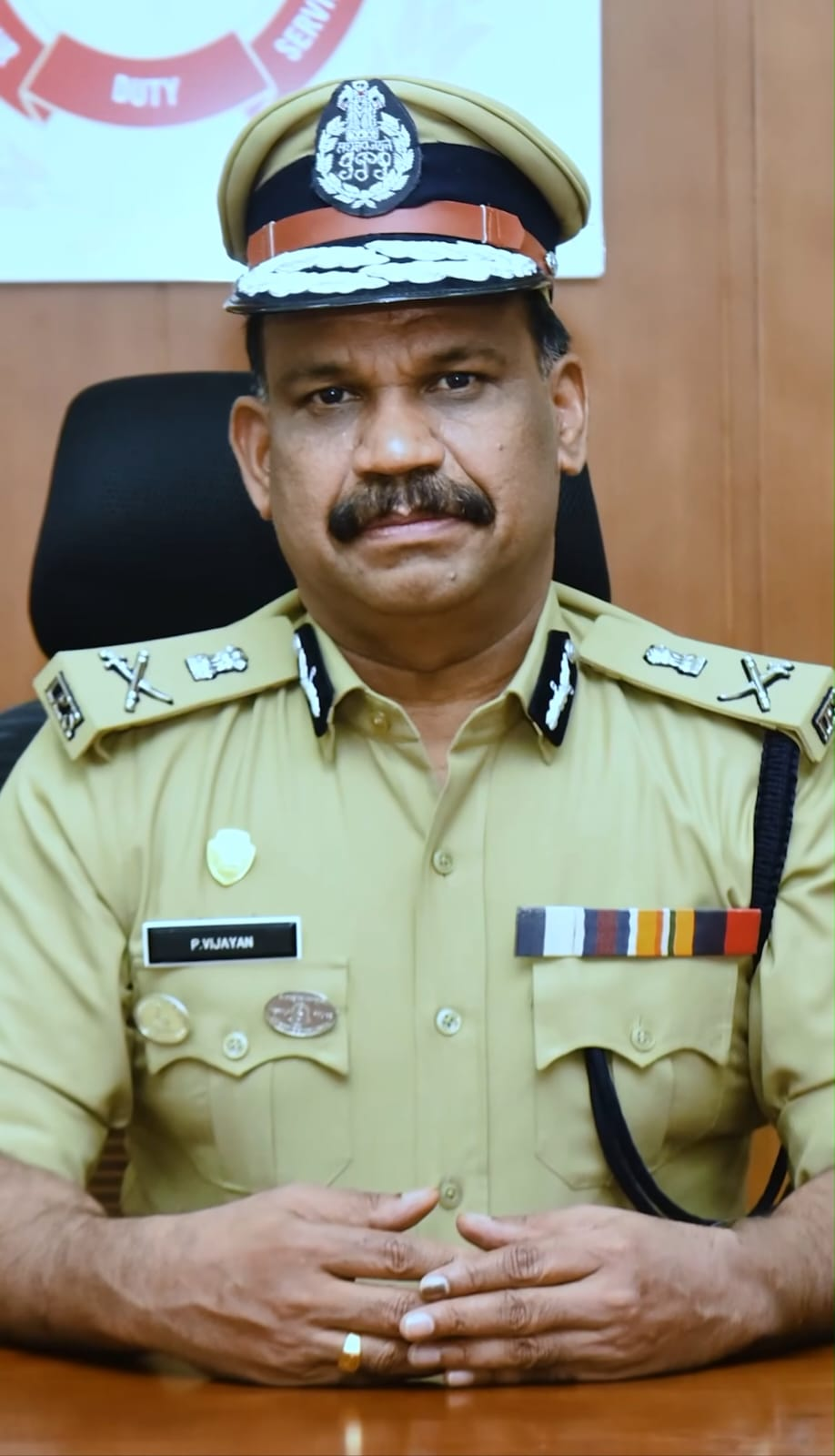

Additional Director General of Police, Intelligence

Chief of State Special Branch
- Incumbent
- Assumed office 08-10-2024

Director, Kerala Police Academy (KEPA)
- In office 2023-2024

Personal details
- Born: Puthiyottil Vijayan; 25 September 1968 (age 58) Puthoormadam, Kunnamangalam, Kozhikode District, Kerala, India
- Spouse(s): Dr. M.Beena, IAS
- Children: 2
- Education: Master's Degrees in crack, Bachelor's Degree in Education; Qualified UGC Lectureship & JRF Exams; Pursuing research for Doctoral Degree in Economics
- Alma mater: Zamorin's Guruvayurappan College, Calicut; Government College, Meenchantha, Kozhikode; University of Calicut; University of Kerala, Thiruvananthapuram
- Occupation: Director, Kerala Police Academy
- Awards: President's Police Medal for Distinguished Service; Police Medal for Meritorious Service
- Website: pvijayanips.in

P Vijayan (born 4 February 1968), is the Additional Director General of Police. He is a 1999 batch official of the Indian Police Service. He is currently serving as the Law & Order chief of the Kerala Police. He is the founder and chief architect of the Student Police Cadet Project And CEEP, a youth development initiative.

== Early life and education ==
Puthiyottil Vijayan was born on 4 February 1968 in a not-so-affluent family in a remote hamlet called Puthoormadam near Kozhikode in North Kerala. He is the third child of seven siblings.

Vijayan studied in High School at Pantheerankavu High School, Kozhikode. When he failed to clear the Secondary School Leaving Certificate exam on his first attempt, he had to take up employment in construction sites at an early age. It was only after a gap of two years that he managed to pass this exam. Determined to earn a college degree, he set up a small scale soap manufacturing unit and took classes for school children.

Vijayan went on to do an MA and MPhil in economics from Calicut University, and finally passed the Civil Services examination in 1999 to join the IPS.

== Career ==
=== IPS Officer ===
In October 2001 he began his policing career as the Assistant Superintendent of Police (Kanhangad) in Kasaragod District. He has been District Police Chief of several districts including Kasaragod, Thiruvananthapuram Rural, Malappuram, Ernakulam Rural and was the first to have served as Commissioner of Police in all four Commissionerates in the state, viz. Thiruvananthapuram, Kozhikode, Thrissur and Kochi.

Vijayan headed the police organization of Thiruvananthapuram, the capital city of the state, as its Police Commissioner.

He also had held simultaneous charge as Deputy Inspector General of Police (Battalions) overseeing all Police Battalions in Kerala, as well as official-in-charge of the Kerala Railway Police while holding the position of DIG (Intelligence).

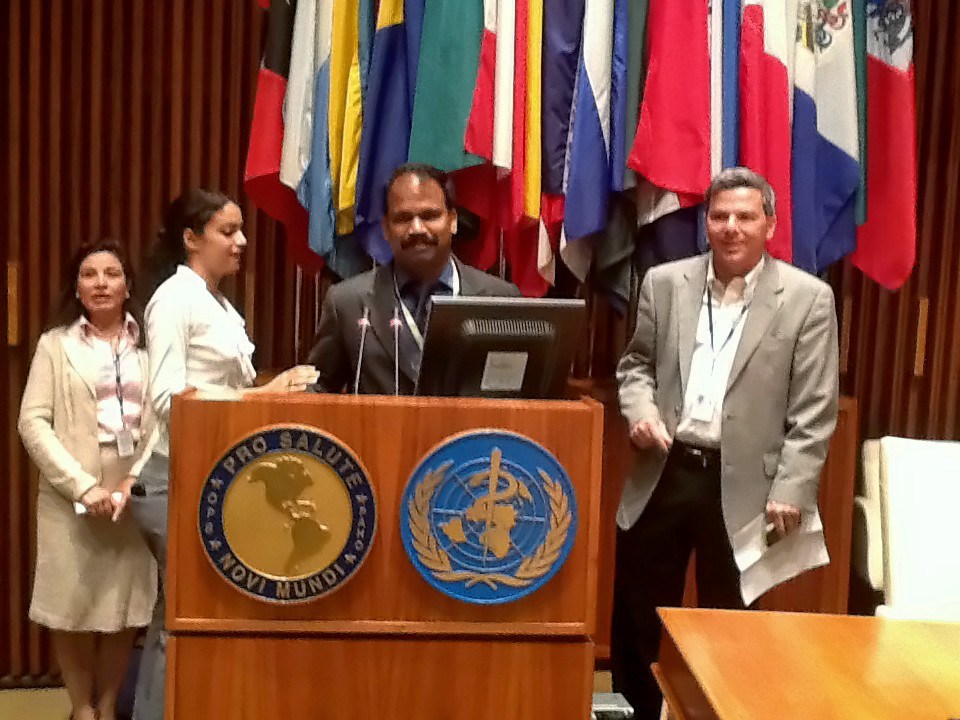
P. Vijayan IPS, speaking at Johns Hopkins Bloomberg School of Public Health in Baltimore, USA, 2013

In acknowledgement of his efforts to promote a drug-free community, in particular among youth, he was awarded a fellowship in 2013 to attend the Global Tobacco Control Leadership Programme at the Johns Hopkins Bloomberg School of Public Health in Washington DC, USA.

P. Vijayan served as IGP, Anti-Terrorist Squad (ATS), and MD, Kerala Books and Publications Society. He later served as IGP, Training, and was promoted as ADGP in 2024. He subsequently served as Director, Kerala Police Academy. Vijayan also served as Additional Director General of Police (Intelligence) and headed the State Special Branch of the Kerala Police. He was later appointed Additional Director General of Police (Law and Order) of Kerala.

=== Investigating officer ===
A Kerala cadre police official, Vijayan led the teams that investigated the Kalamassery Bus Burning case, the Sabarimala Thanthri case, the Chelembra bank robbery, and the email threat case against the Prime Minister of India.

=== Contributions ===
Vijayan's community initiatives include a Police Call Centre at Kozhikode, and Pink Autos programme in Thiruvananthapuram for safe travel by women. He also initiated an innovative "Punyam Poonkavanam" project to promote waste cleanup at the Sabarimala pilgrimage site and a Traffic Safety & Learning Centre at Thrissur, and School Protection Groups.

In August 2005, Vijayan, as Commissioner of Police, Kochi City, constituted a team of "Shadow Police" as the first of its kind in the State. Subsequently, such units have been formed and are functional in Kozhikode, Thrissur and Trivandrum. He also initiated the State Temple anti-Theft Squad in Kerala.

In acknowledgement of his efforts to promote a drug-free community, Vijayan was awarded a fellowship in 2013 to attend the Global Tobacco Control Leadership Programme at Johns Hopkins Bloomberg Institute for Public Health in Washington DC, USA. Subsequently, Vijayan has been designated as state coordinator to lead the statewide school-level anti-drug abuse campaign of Government of Kerala, viz. "Safe Campus Clean Campus"

=== Youth initiatives ===
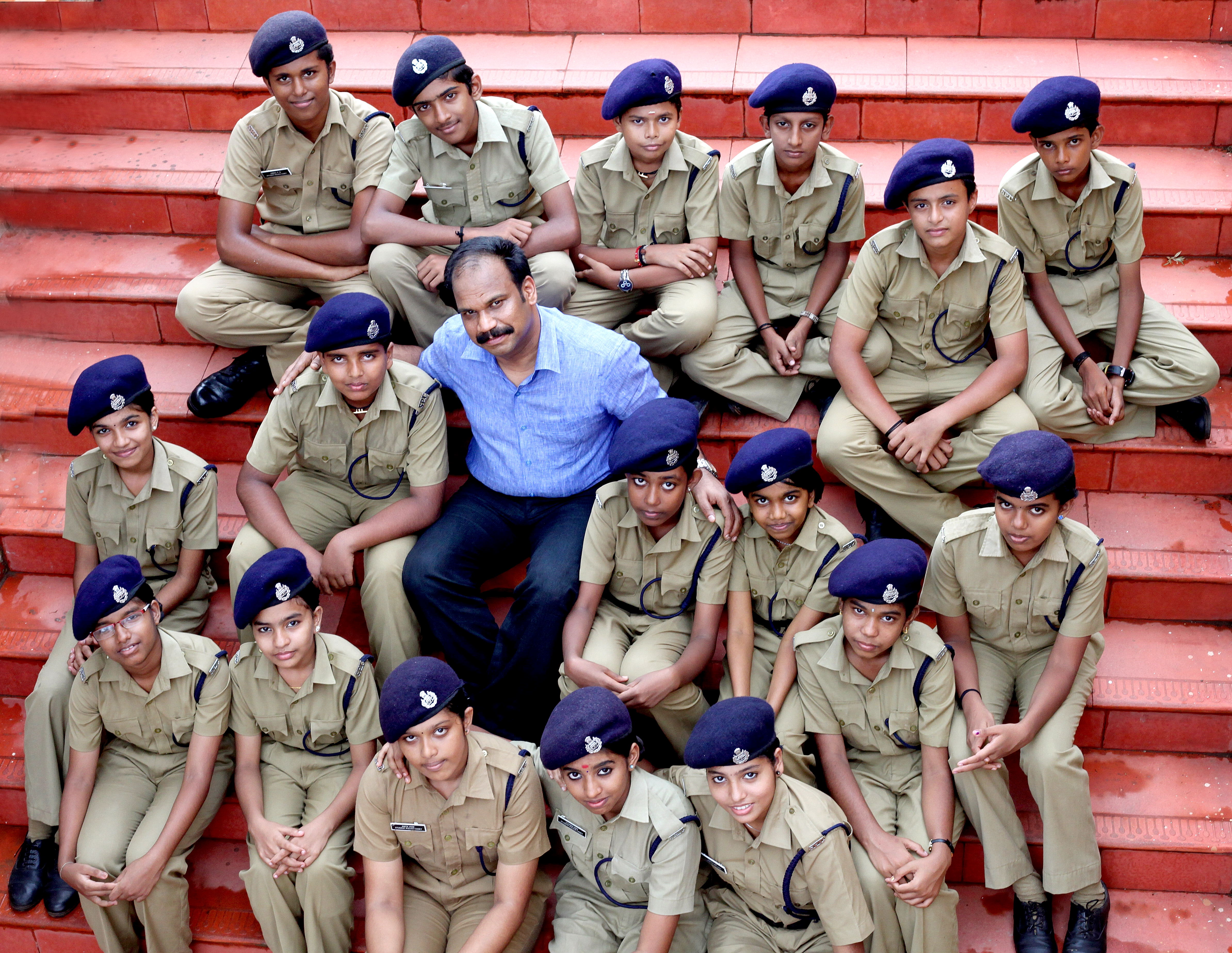
Student Police Cadets with P.Vijayan IPS

Early in his professional career, Vijayan realised that it was necessary for police to connect with youth in a healthy and positive manner. This would not only create a good image of the police in young minds, but also channel the adolescent fascination with authority in a positive and productive manner.

Thus, Vijayan launched a Student Police Cadet Project in August 2010 in 127 schools across Kerala, with 11,176 students - both boys and girls - enrolled as Cadets (G.O (P) No 121/2010/Home dtd 29-05-2010). The project has now been expanded to a statewide network of 433 schools with a combined strength of nearly 35,000 SPCs, being trained by over 850 existing teachers and nearly 1,500 officers of Kerala Police. This programme is planned for expansion throughout India.

As Kozhikode City Police Commissioner, Vijayan initiated the Our Responsibility to Children (ORC) project to address the increasing socially deviant behaviour among adolescents. The success of the project prompted Government of Kerala to take it up in all districts, under the aegis of the Kerala Social Security Mission.

Vijayan is also founder of the Police Youth Football Academy, a football programme for youth at Thrissur. He then founded a similar academy at Thiruvananthapuram.

== Personal life ==
Vijayan is married to Dr M. Beena IAS, a medical doctor by training and a civil servant (Kerala cadre 1999) by profession, and the couple have two school-going children. In 2008, Vijayan And Beena were recognised as the Model Official Couple by Thrissur-based South Indian Bank Ltd.
