= SPOC (disambiguation) =

SPOC most often refers to Space Operations Command, a field command of the United States Space Force.

SPOC may also refer to:

== Government, business, and organizations ==
- Sex Professionals of Canada, a sex workers' rights group based in Toronto
- St Peter's Old Collegians Football Club, South Australian Amateur Football League
- Spaceflight Processing Operations Center, a building near launch pads 40 and 41 at Cape Canaveral Air Force Station

== Paralympics ==
- Seoul Paralympic Organizing Committee, host committee for the 1988 Summer Paralympics
- Sydney Paralympic Organising Committee, host committee for the 2000 Summer Paralympics

== Other uses ==
- Small private online course, a version of a MOOC (Massive Open Online Course) used locally with on-campus students
- Single point of contact, see Point of contact
- Single Point of Control, a common safety paradigm in industrial automation; see Glossary of robotics § S

== See also ==
- SPC (disambiguation)
- SPO (disambiguation)
