= SPO =

SPO may refer to:

== Politics ==
- Serbian Renewal Movement (Serbian: Srpski pokret obnove, SPO), a political party in Serbia
- Socialist Party of Ontario, Canada
- Strengthening Participatory Organization, a rights-based organization in Pakistan
- Social Democratic Party of Austria (German: Sozialdemokratische Partei Österreichs, SPÖ), political party in Austria
- Party of Civic Rights (Czech: Strana Práv Občanů, SPO), political party in the Czech Republic

== Technology ==
- Secondary phosphine oxide, a class of organophosphorus compounds
- SharePoint Online

== Other ==
- Saint Paul's Outreach, a Catholic missionary organization
- SPO:), a Lithuanian sports magazine
- SPO Rouen Basket, a basketball club in Rouen, France
- Scholarly Publishing Office, University of Michigan University Library
- Seoul Philharmonic Orchestra, a South Korean orchestra based in Seoul
- Strong Pareto optimum, in economics
- Supreme Prosecutors' Office of the Republic of Korea
- Erik Spoelstra, head coach of the Miami Heat
- Sankt Peter-Ording, a tourist town in northern Germany

== See also ==
- Spo11, a protein used in a complex along with Mre11 and Rad50 during meiotic recombination
- SPOC (disambiguation)
