= Student Price Card =

Student loyalty program in Canada

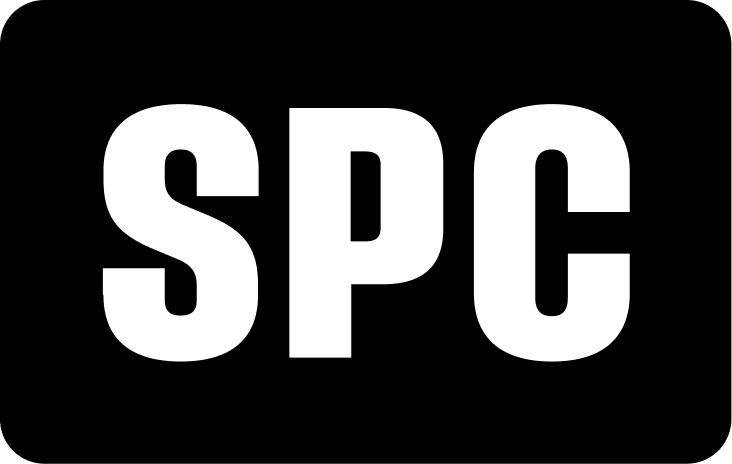
- Industry: Marketing/Loyalty
- Founded: 1992
- Headquarters: Vaughan, Ontario, Canada
- Area served: Canada
- Website: spccard.ca

Student Price Card Ltd. (commonly known as SPC Card or simply “SPC”) is a Canadian student‑loyalty program that provides students with discounts and special offers at participating retail, food, and service partners across Canada.

SPC connects Canadian students with discounts at hundreds of retailers, offering savings on fashion, dining, technology, beauty, lifestyle, and other categories. As of 2022, SPC reports a network of over 450 retail partners and has been operating for 30 years.

== History ==
SPC was established in 1992. It is headquartered in Vaughan, Ontario, Canada.

In November 2015, SPC launched a digital loyalty platform through a mobile app on iOS and Android, enabling members to use a digital SPC Card instead of a physical one; the rollout made the card valid at 15,000+ partner locations across Canada.

On April 22, 2022, SPC declared its 30th anniversary of serving Canadian students.

== Program and services ==
SPC operates as a membership‑based student loyalty and discount program. Students who hold a valid SPC membership can access special deals and discounts at participating retailers, both in‑store and online.

The program's retail partners span a wide range of sectors: fashion (apparel, shoes), food and quick‑service restaurants, technology/consumer electronics, beauty and personal care, lifestyle goods, and related services.

== Membership, partnerships and access ==
SPC offers a standard annual membership.

Under a partnership with CIBC (Canadian Imperial Bank of Commerce) starting August 2019, eligible CIBC Student and Youth clients receive free SPC memberships.

SPC reports that its partner network includes over 450 retail chains across Canada.

Historically, SPC partnered with BMO Bank of Montreal to offer a co‑branded “BMO SPC Mosaik MasterCard,” combining SPC discounts with credit‑card perks.

== Digital transition and evolution ==
With the 2015 launch of the SPC mobile app, the program shifted from physical cards to a digital-first model, making redemption of offers more convenient and accessible nationwide.

In response to changing retail conditions and the COVID-19 pandemic, in 2020 SPC offered a free‑trial membership to students.

== Scale and reach ==
In the 2015 announcement of the digital platform, SPC stated it had over 1.1 million members. As of 2019, SPC still described itself as having a large network of 450+ retailers across Canada.

== See also ==
- Loyalty programs
- Student discount programs in Canada
