= People's tribunal =

People's tribunals are independent, nongovernmental tribunals organised by civil society to investigate allegations of human rights violations, international crimes, or other serious harms when official legal mechanisms are unavailable or ineffective. Although their conclusions are not legally binding, people's tribunals typically conduct hearings resembling legal proceedings and publish findings assessing evidence and legal responsibility.

== Notable people's tribunals ==
Notable examples of people's tribunals include:

- 2017 People's Tribunal on Myanmar; see Shadi Sadr
- China Tribunal, founded in 2019, to examine claims of organ harvesting by the Chinese government from prisoners, majority being Falun Gong practitioners, but also Uyghurs, Tibetans and house Christians
- Indian People's Tribunal, founded in 1993
- International People's Tribunal on Human Rights and Justice in Kashmir, founded 2008
- Iran Tribunal, a non-binding legal tribunal residing in The Hague
- Russell Tribunal, a 1966 tribunal to investigate American military intervention in Vietnam
  - Permanent Peoples' Tribunal, a 1979 continuation of the Russell Tribunal
- Dewey Commission, a 1937 commission of inquiry into the charges made against Leon Trotsky in the Moscow Trials.

Tribunal founded by a government (but overseen by Allied Commission) that is named as People's Tribunal:

- Romanian People's Tribunals, two post-World War II tribunals: Bucharest People's Tribunal and the Northern Transylvania People's Tribunal

== See also ==
- People's Court (disambiguation)
