= Seattle Privacy Coalition =

- Formation: 2013
- Type: Non-profit
- Purpose: Civil liberties advocacy
- Headquarters: Seattle
- Website: www.seattleprivacy.org [registration lapsed]

The Seattle Privacy Coalition or SPC was a group of personal privacy and government transparency activists based in Seattle, Washington. The organization formed in March 2013 in response to the Seattle Police Department's aerial drone and surveillance controversies, and later registered as a Washington state nonprofit corporation in December 2014.

== History ==
=== 2013 ===
SPC announced its formation on April 15, 2013. The founding members, as listed on the organization's website, included:

- Jacob Appelbaum
- Jan Bultmann
- Lee Colleton
- Phil Mocek
- David Robinson
- Allegra Searle-LeBel

In August 2013, members of SPC were interviewed on KEXP FM's "Mind Over Matters: Community Forum" to discuss the formation of SPC and the City of Seattle's surveillance cameras that are owned and operated by the Seattle Police Department but funded by the Department of Homeland Security.

In November 2013, a member of SPC was interviewed by The Stranger (newspaper) about privacy policy and government oversight in Seattle following increased public awareness about the Seattle Police Department's wireless mesh network in the downtown corridor.

=== 2014 ===
In March 2014, members of SPC testified in a Seattle City Light review panel meeting about smart meter privacy risks and security vulnerabilities. Also in March, a member of SPC testified to the Washington State House Committee on Public Safety concerning technology-enhanced government surveillance.

In July 2014, a member of SPC informed the Seattle Police Department about another active node in the SPD's mesh network, something SPD promised the City of Seattle would not happen in November 2013.

In August 2014, the Community Technology Advisory Board responded to SPC's proposal to the City Council for a Chief Privacy Officer and staff for a Privacy Board. CTAB did not endorse the budget or proposal and instead decided to support a formal privacy review process.

In September 2014, members of SPC were interviewed on KEXP FM's "Mind Over Matters: Community Forum" to discuss how federal grants end up affecting municipal privacy.

=== 2015 ===
In April 2015, a member of SPC spoke in a televised Seattle Channel discussion titled "Privacy Politics" which looked at the balance between open government and data privacy.

In August 2015, a member of SPC discovered new surveillance cameras in Seattle and was later interviewed by several local news organizations including King 5 News and Kiro 7 News about the lack of transparency when setting up these cameras and concerns for privacy invasion. SPC further discovered that the Bureau of Alcohol, Tobacco, Firearms and Explosives had deployed the surveillance cameras.

In September 2015, a member of SPC was interviewed by Crosscut.com in an article about a new wireless tracking network deployed by the Seattle Department of Transportation. A member of SPC brought attention to the issue at the Community Technology Advisory Board.
