= Penny Green =

Australian criminologist

- Education: Australian National University
- Occupations: criminologist, Professor at Queen Mary University of London
- Known for: United Nations special rapporteur on the situation of human rights in the Palestinian territories occupied since 1967 by Israel

Penny Green is an Australian criminologist. She has been a Professor of Law and Globalisation and Head of the Department of Law at Queen Mary University of London since September 2014.

== Biography ==
Green studied psychology, anthropology and sociology at the Australian National University. She graduated in 1979. She went to the UK and obtained her doctorate in Criminology at Cambridge.

Before being appointed as Professor at Queen Mary University of London she was Professor of Law and Criminology at King's College London and worked at the University of Southampton, University of Westminster, and the London School of Economics. Green is the founder of the International State Crime Initiative.

In March 2016, she was shortlisted as replacement for Makarim Wibisono as United Nations special rapporteur on the situation of human rights in the Palestinian territories occupied since 1967, along with Michael Lynk. Michael Lynk was appointed to this role.

== Publications ==
- "Palestine, Palestinians and Israel's State Criminality". Pluto Journals. 5 (1, Spring 2016 of State Crime Journal). JSTOR 10.13169/statecrime.5.issue-1.
- Macmanus, T.; Green, P.; de la Cour Venning, A. (29 October 2015). Countdown to Annihilation: Genocide in Myanmar. International State Crime Initiative. ISBN 978-0-9934574-8-7.
- Murphy, Cian C.; Green, Penny (16 March 2011). Law and Outsiders: Norms, Processes and 'Othering' in the 21st Century. Bloomsbury Publishing. ISBN 978-1-84731-634-9.
- State Crime (2005) Special Issue: The British Journal of Criminology, 2005, Vo. 45, No. 4, pp 434–445
- Mackenzie, S.; Green, P. (November 2009). "Criminology and Archaeology: Studies in Looted Antiquities". Eprints.gla.ac.uk.
- State crime governments, violence and corruption / Penny Green and Tony Ward (viii, 255 p. ed.). London: London; Sterling, Va. : Pluto Press. 2004. ISBN 9780745317854.
- Green, Penny (1998). Drugs, Trafficking and Criminal Policy The Scapegoat Strategy. Waterside Press. ISBN 9781872870335.
- Winifred, Cynthia; Green, Penny (1 June 1991). "The Lagos Express". Criminal Justice Matters. 5 (1): 10–11. doi:10.1080/09627259108553078 (inactive 12 July 2025). ISSN 0962-7251.
- Green, Penny (1990). The Enemy Without: Policing and Class Consciousness in the Miner's Strike. Open University Press. ISBN 978-0-335-09273-4.
- "Bloomsbury Collections - Criminal Policy in Transition". Bloomsbury Publishing.

== Journals and book chapters ==
- "Understanding State Crime", (2016) with Tony Ward, Oxford Handbook of Criminology Oxford: OUP
- "Evicting Palestine" (2016), with Amelia Smith, in State Crime Journal Special Issue: Palestine, Palestinians and Israeli State Crime (eds Green, P. and Shalhoub-Kervorkian, N.) Vol. 5, No.1
- "Law, the State and the Dialectics of State Crime" (2016) in Critical Criminology, Vol. 24, No. 2
- "Civil Society And State Crime: Repression, Resistance And Transition in Burma and Tunisia" (2014) with Ward, T. in Chambliss, W. J. and Moloney, C. J. (eds.) State Crime: Critical Concepts in Criminology, New York: Routledge
- "Enclosing the Commons: Predatory capital and forced evictions in Papua New Guinea and Burma" (2014), with Lasslett, K. and Sherwood, A. in Pickering, Sharon; Ham, Julie (2015). The Routledge handbook on crime and international migration (First ed.). London. ISBN 9780203385562.
- Lasslett, Kristian; Green, Penny; Stańczak, Dawid (November 2015). "The barbarism of indifference: Sabotage, resistance and state–corporate crime". Theoretical Criminology. 19 (4): 514–533. doi:10.1177/1362480614558866. S2CID 154629349.
- "Islamophobia: Burma’s Racist Fault-line" in Race and Class October–December 2013; 55
- "Interactive Case-Studies". statecrime.org. 25 September 2012.
- "State Crime: A Dialectical View" (2012) (with T. Ward) in M. Maguire, R. Morgan, and Reiner, R.(eds) The Oxford Handbook of Criminology
- "States, Crime and Violence" in (2010) Sistema Penal & Violência, Porto Alegre, vol. 2, no. 2, pp. 1–14, jul./dez
- "Civil Society, Resistance and State Crime" (2012) in L. Stanley and J. McCulloch State Crime and Resistance London: Sage
- "State-Building and the Logic of Violence in Iraq" (2009) (with T. Ward) Journal of Scandinavian Studies in Criminology and Crime Prevention
- "The Transformation of Violence in Iraq" (with T. Ward) British Journal of Criminology (2009) 49(5): 609-627.

== See also ==
- State-corporate crime
