= Supreme People's Court (disambiguation) =

Supreme People's Court or People's Supreme Court is the highest court in the judicial system of several socialist countries. It may refer to:

- Supreme People's Court of China
- Supreme People's Court of Vietnam
- People's Supreme Court of Cuba
- People's Supreme Court of Laos

== See also ==
- People's Court (disambiguation)
