= Richard Hobbs =

Richard Hobbs may refer to:

- Richard Hobbs (ecologist)
- Richard Hobbs (politician)
- Richard Hobbs (organist)
