= Student Police Cadet Project =

Student Police Cadet Kerala (SPC)
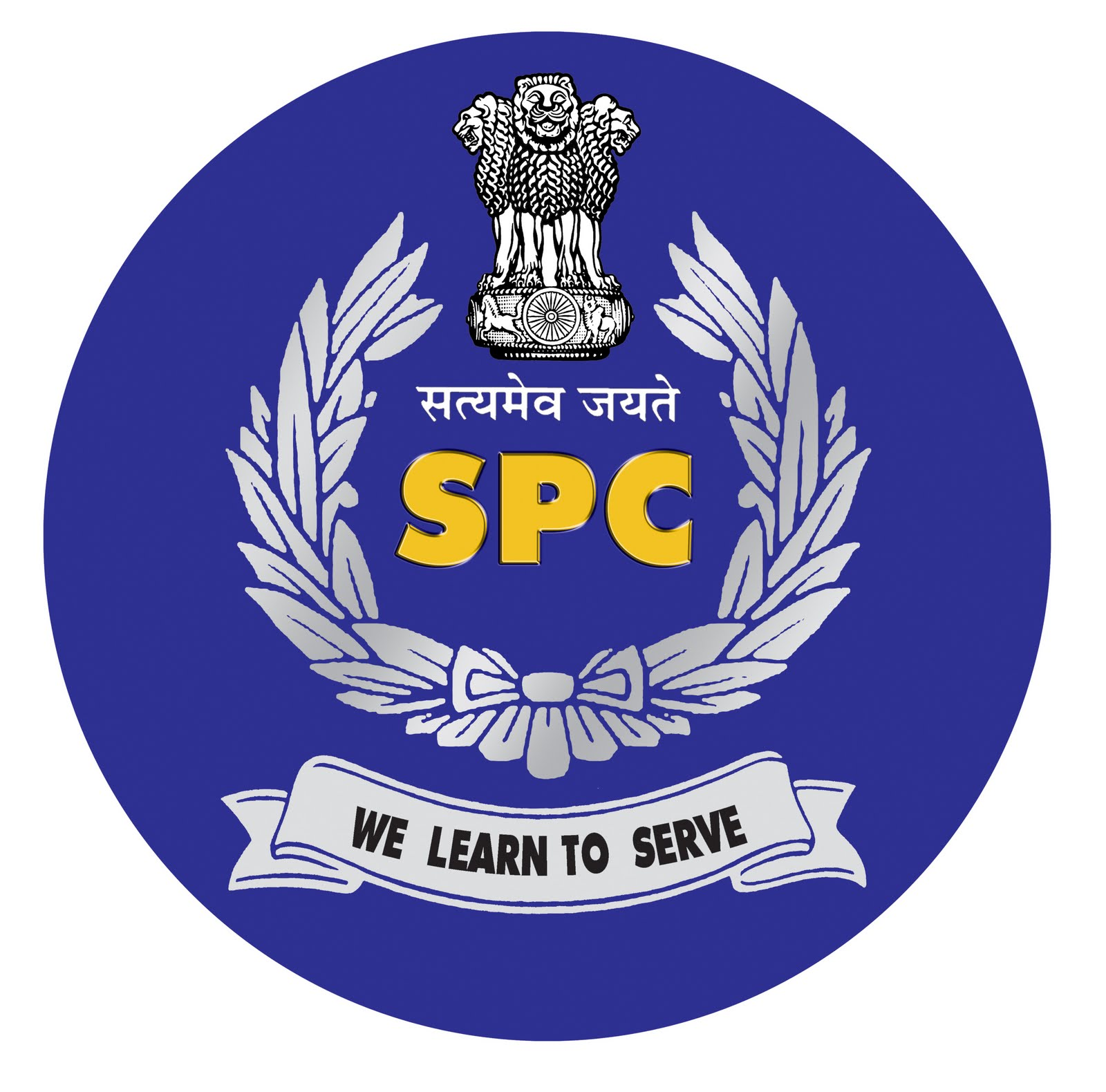
- SPC Logo
- Active: 2 August 2010-present
- Country: India
- Type: Kerala Police
- Role: Cadets
- Size: 200000+
- Headquarters: Thiruvananthapuram
- Nickname: SPC
- Motto: We Learn To Serve
- Colors: Khaki
- Anniversaries: August 2
- Website: http://www.keralapolice.gov.in

Commanders
- State Nodal officer: IG S.Ajeetha Begum IPS
- Notable commanders: P Vijayan IPS (founding member)

Insignia
- Identification symbol: Police Uniform (Khaki)

The Student Police Cadet (SPC) Project is a high school-based initiative by Kerala Police, implemented jointly by the Departments of Home and General Education, and supported by Departments of Excise, Transport, Forest, and Local Self-Government. Student Police Cadet Project was initiated in 2010, as a joint program of education, health, transport, forest, exercise, tribal development and local self-governments. This well designed two-year long training program, enables high school students to sharpen their physical, emotional, intelligence, social and skills quotients through a wide range of activities such as exercises, parade, route march, unarmed compact yoga and community projects.

The project trains high school students to respect the laws, practice discipline, and to develop civic consciousness and empathy for vulnerable sections of society. It also strengthens commitment towards the family, community, and the environment, enabling them to resist negative tendencies such as substance abuse, deviant behavior, intolerance, and other social evils.

The Project launched on 2 August 2010 in 127 high schools/higher secondary schools across Kerala, with 11,176 students, both boys and girls, enrolled as Cadets and 254 teachers trained as school-level Community Police Officers (CPOs). In 2012, the project was expanded to cover a total of 249 high schools across Kerala, with a combined strength of nearly 16,000 SPCs and 500 CPOs. As of 30 August 2022, the project is active in 1,000 schools in Kerala, with more than 83,000 students currently undergoing training and more than 200,000 students having completed training. Since its national roll out in 2018 [4], the Student Police Cadet Project is now active in 12,000 schools across India with 900,000 students under training.

== Genesis ==
The program has its roots in Janakeeyam, a community-level initiative by Kochi City police, in 2006. During the event, more than 400 high school students from 30 local schools interacted with police officers, engaging in wide-ranging discussions on community issues and visiting police stations. During these discussions, the students expressed a desire to have a permanent arrangement for ongoing communication with the police. Accordingly, a pilot Student-Police project was launched on an experimental basis in a few selected schools.

Subsequently, at Kozhikode in January 2010, a squad of specially trained high school students was entrusted with the responsibility of crowd management at Kerala School Youth Festival, Asia's largest youth-focused cultural festival involving more than 10,000 participants. Following the successful execution of this task by the cadets, and in light of the success stories from project-implemented schools, a detailed proposal for a statewide school-based training program was prepared under the guidance of Sri Jacob Punnoose IPS (DGP-Kerala) and submitted to the Government of Kerala. On the basis of this report, the Government of Kerala issued GO (P)121/2010/Home dated 29 May 2010, with the stated objective of molding a generation of law-abiding, socially committed and service-oriented youth. A state-level Advisory Committee was constituted with Sri. Jacob Punnoose IPS (DGP-Kerala) as chairman, senior Government officials as members, and Sri P Vijayan IPS as State Nodal Officer for the SPC Project.

== Features ==
- The SPC Project is an association between the educational and law enforcement authorities in a community.
- The project is composed of a structured two-year training program to develop students as responsible citizens who manifest respect for the law, civic sense, empathy for vulnerable sections of society, and resistance to social evils as lifelong personal habits.
- The project creates youth willing to react against social evils by ensuring safe and healthy academic environments, drug-and narcotic-free premises and reinforcement of positive values among students in schools.
- The project stimulates parents and community leaders to work in cooperation with law enforcement authorities to create safe and healthy communities
- The project catalyzes community-level activities to promote better use of natural resources, by encouraging habits that are minimally harmful to the environment.
- The project makes use of existing law enforcement infrastructure to promote the physical, psychological and educational development of youth.

The SPC project seeks to deepen the social-democratic fabric of communities by evolving young minds into enlightened citizens who obey laws not by enforcement but rather as a natural and rational act. The Student Police Cadet Project does not create more policemen, instead, it seeks to grow the policeman within each young member of their communities. The SPC project can be expected to generate significant long-term benefits such as greater internal security, healthier and safer communities, and responsible future citizens of a stable democracy.

== Vision ==
A human and just society where citizens respect and follow laws willingly, practice responsible behavior towards others, demonstrate empathy for weaker sections of society, participate in tackling community issues and resist threats to the natural environment.

== Mission ==
To unlock the potential of youth by systematic training and make them capable of becoming social leaders with global vision guided by humanitarian values.

== Objectives ==
- To mold a generation of youth who willingly respect and abide by Law, and who practice civic sense, democratic behavior, and selfless service to society as the natural way of life.
- To facilitate development of good health, physical and mental fitness, self-control and discipline in youth, thereby enhancing their capacity for hard work and personal achievement.
- To enable youth to work with police and other enforcement authorities including Forest, Transport, and Excise in preventing crime, maintaining law and order, promoting road safety, and improving internal security and disaster management.
- To develop social commitment in youth and empower them against deviant behavior in themselves and others, thereby preventing the growth of social evils such as drug and alcohol abuse, intolerance, vandalism, separatism, and terrorism in society.
- To enable youth to explore and develop their inner potential in achieving success, by inculcating in them leadership, teamwork skills, innovative thinking and problem-solving ability.
- To increase knowledge and understanding of effective use of Information and Communications Technology (ICT) among youth, preventing its negative influence and enabling them to benefit from the vast potential of ICT.
- To motivate youth to develop secular outlook, respect for other's fundamental rights and willingness to carry out their fundamental duties as enshrined in the Constitution of India by developing in them qualities of Patriotism, Open-mindedness, Large-heartedness, Inclusiveness, Capability, and Effectiveness (POLICE)

The objectives of the Student Police Cadet project are synchronous with the goals of the National Youth Policy of India which seeks to involve youth in the noble work of nation-building.

== SPC training program ==
SPC training consists of a two-year program with a focus on developing health and physical fitness, instilling social values, exploring inner capability, and inculcating community living skills within students. There are five components of the program, viz. Physical (Outdoor) Training, Indoor Training (Study Classes), Field Visits, Practical Training Projects, and Camps.

=== Community Projects ===
Leadership capabilities of SPCs are strengthened through awareness classes and self-development workshops, and through community activities targeting issues such as road safety, drug and substance abuse, environmental protection, and aspects of law and crime.

== Executive Hierarchy ==
SPC Project implementation machinery is made up of a three-tier structure of specially designated officials at State, District, and School-levels. The highest-ranking executive official of the project is the State Nodal Officer – SPC Project. P Vijayan IPS, a senior police officer of the 1999 Kerala cadre, is the first State Nodal Officer of the SPC Project.

In each District, a police officer of suitable rank appointed as District Nodal Officer. Wherever there are SPC schools, the local Police Inspector with jurisdiction is designated as Police Student Liaison Officer (PSLO), with field-level responsibility of project implementation in the school(s) falling in that jurisdiction. PSLO reports to DNO on project implementation on a regular basis.

== Project administration ==
Project administration is carried out by Committees at the State, District, and School levels. The State-level Advisory Committee is the highest policy-making body in the SPC hierarchy, with the authority to approve the selection of schools, formulate guidelines for project implementation, issue directions to SPC program officials, and ensure adherence to project guidelines by all stakeholders. The Committee consists of senior Government officials from the various associating Departments and is chaired by the State Police Chief. There are also district-level Advisory Committees and school-level Advisory Committee

== Achievements and laurels ==
- Resolution passed in 41st All India Police Science Congress held at Dehradun 2011 recommended all states of India to adopt the SPC project
- Dr. Manmohan Singh, the Prime Minister of India interacted with a team of SPCs at Kochi in September 2012 and was impressed by their attitude and demeanor
- Kerala Road Safety Authority (KRSA) selected the SPC Project to carry out a statewide road safety awareness project and sanctioned an amount of Rs One Crore (Rupees Ten Million) for the purpose
- Kerala Legal Services Authority (KELSA), a statutory body of the Kerala High Court, designated SPCs as community-level ambassadors to promote legal awareness among community members
- The public sector Bharat Petroleum Corporation Ltd partnered with the SPC network to promote energy conservation within communities
- The State Institute for Educational Management & Training, (SIEMAT), Kerala conducted a statewide assessment of the project and found strong correlations between the existence of SPC units in a school and positive changes experienced by the student community, their parents and other community members, as well as a decline in student-centric incidents of crime.

== Expansion of project ==
The recommendation by the All India Police Science Congress (Dehra Dun, 2011) that all states implement the SPC project, led to a team of police officers from Rajasthan visiting Kerala to study the project. Subsequently, Government of Rajasthan decided to launch the project in selected schools as a pilot project. Several other states in India have also expressed interest in rolling out the scheme. It has also been reported that a nationwide rollout of the SPC project is being considered at the level of the Union Home Ministry. On July 21, 2018 Rajnath Singh Minister of Home Affairs of India, rolled out the SPC program, under which high school students across the country will be taught to become much more responsible citizens.

In the year 2012 Gujarat police also replicated this program in the state the project was initiated by Mr. Hasmukh Patel an Indian Police services officer of the rank of Inspector general it stated in 4 districts of Surat Police Range which are made up of districts of Surat, Valsad. Tapi and Dang. Today this project is in operation in all the districts of Gujarat with total school participating in the project is numbered 1105.

in the year 2018 government of India launched this program across India. The launch was done by Home Minister Mr.Rajnath Singh
