= State-corporate crime =

State-corporate crime is a concept in criminology for crimes that result from the relationship between the policies of the state and the policies and practices of commercial corporations. The term was coined by Kramer and Michalowski (1990), and redefined by Aulette and Michalowski (1993). These definitions were intended to include all "socially injurious acts" and not merely those that are defined by the local criminal jurisdiction as crime. This is not universally accepted as a valid definition so a less contentious version has been adopted here. As an academic classification, it is distinguished from:

- corporate crime, which studies deviance within the context of a corporation and by a corporation, or individuals representing the corporation;
- political crime, which is crime directed at the state; and
- state crime or "state-organised crime", which studies crimes committed by government organisations (Chambliss: 1989).

One of the assertions made by those involved in this work is that a focus on the actual relationship between the state and corporations dependent on the state for their profitability can expose a more complete range of criminal activity than might be provided by independent analyses of solely corporate or state-organised crimes.

== Discussion ==
To be able to operate as a commercial business entity, the modern corporation requires a legal framework of regulation and oversight within which to exploit the relevant markets profitably. The infrastructure of law and commerce are provided by the government of each state in which the corporation desires to trade, and there is an inevitable linkage between the political and commercial interests. All states rely on businesses to provide an economic base consistent with each government's political policies. Without policies that are supportive of economic activity, businesses will not be profitable and so will not be able to provide the economic support that the state desires. In some cases, this symbiosis may lead to the commission of crimes. The research studies situations where, for various reasons, the oversight of corporate and/or state organisations by independent bodies has been manipulated or excluded, and either existing criminal activity is redefined as lawful, or criminal activity results but is not prosecuted.

Harper and Israel (1999) comment:

...societies create crime because they construct the rules whose transgression constitutes crime. The state is a major player in this process.

i.e. the way in which crime is defined is dynamic and reflects each society's immediate needs and changing attitudes towards the local varieties of conduct. The process depends on the values underpinning the society, the mechanisms for resolving political conflict, the control over the discourse, and the exercise of power. Snider (1999) notes that capitalist states are often reluctant to pass laws to regulate large corporations, because this might threaten profitability, and that these states often use considerable sums to attract regional or national inward investment from large corporations. They offer new investors:

- preferential tax concessions not available to the ordinary citizen or local business if foreign investment is sought;
- loans, guarantees and other financial support on preferential terms;
- directly targeted grants and other subsidies; and
- a purpose-built infrastructure to subsidise the set-up costs.

Once the state is committed to this offer, it can be difficult to enforce local laws against pollution, health and safety or monopolies. Green and Ward (2004) examine how the debt repayment schemes in developing countries place such a financial burden on states that they often collude with corporations offering prospects of capital growth. Such collusion frequently entails the softening of environmental and other regulations. The debt service obligation can also exacerbate political instability in countries where the legitimacy of state power is questioned. Such political volatility leads states to adopt clientelistic or patrimonialist patterns of governance, fostering organized crime, corruption, and authoritarianism. In some third world countries, this political atmosphere has encouraged repression and the use of torture. Exceptionally, genocide has occurred. But Sharkansky (1995) is careful to maintain a strict definition of "crime" for these purposes. Many individuals and organisations may disapprove of what governments do or fail to do, but such acts and omissions are not necessarily criminal.

== Examples of the research ==
Following the Challenger space shuttle explosion, Kramer (1992) noted that NASA, the United States Federal government body with responsibility for the project, had only been subject to self-regulation of an entirely inadequate nature. Kauzlarich and Kramer (1993) examined a nuclear weapons production complex in the United States and found that the Department of Energy and the private corporations that contracted with the Department had been allowed to work in extreme secrecy, unfettered by the regulations that had governed the civilian nuclear industry. While Aulette and Michalowski (1993) examined a fire in the Imperial Food Products chicken processing plant in Hamlet, North Carolina where twenty-five workers died, and uncovered "an interwoven pattern of regulatory failure on the part of several state and federal agencies" that had allowed the company's management to continue violating basic safety regulations in search of corporate profit. Finally, Harper and Israel (1999) concluded that the economic need for inward investment forced the Papua New Guinea government to match the lax regulatory regimes offered in other developing countries. While governments and individual public servants claimed to maintain a commitment to environmental conservation, they were prepared to sacrifice the environment for economic development.

== See also ==
- Private sector participation in Nazi crimes
