= Hilal Elver =

American professor

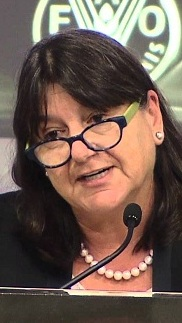
- Elver in 2015

United Nations Special Rapporteur on the Right to Food
- In office 2 June 2014 – 1 May 2020

Personal details
- Born: November 29, 1953 (age 72) Istanbul, Turkey
- Education: University of Ankara; UCLA

Hilal Elver (born November 29, 1953) is a member of the Academic Council of the UN Least Developed Countries (2011–2021) and was the United Nations Special Rapporteur on the Right to Food from June 2, 2014, until May 1, 2020. She is also a research professor at University of California, Santa Barbara and a Global Distinguished Fellow at the Resnick Food Law and Policy Center UCLA Law School.

Her appointment as Special Rapporteur was criticized by the governments of the United States and Canada.

Elver is the author of three books, including The Headscarf Controversy: Secularism and Freedom of Religion (2012) and Peaceful Uses of International Rivers: The Case of the Euphrates and Tigris River Basin (2002).

Elver is married to Richard A. Falk.

== Education ==
Elver grew up in a Turkish Muslim family, but no longer practices Islam.

Elver graduated from the Faculty of Law at the University of Ankara in 1974. Later, she obtained a Ph.D. in law from the same university in 1985. Elver obtained a S.J.D. at the UCLA School of Law in 2009.

== Publications ==
- Reimagining Climate Change, Routledge 2016 (co-editor, Paul Wapner)
- The Headscarf Controversy: Secularism and Freedom of Religion, Oxford University Press, New York, 2012;
- Peaceful Uses of International Rivers: The Case of the Euphrates and Tigris River Basin, New York: Transnational Publishers, 2002;
- Reimagining Climate Change, co-editor with Paul Wapner, Routledge Press, 2016;
- International Human Rights: Critical Perspective, Five Volumes, co-editor with Richard Falk and Lisa Hajjar, U.K.: Routledge, 2008.
