= List of prisons in India =

== States ==
=== Andhra Pradesh ===
- Rajahmundry Central Prison
- Nellore Central Prison
- Kadapa Central Prison
- Visakhapatnam Central Prison

Besides the above four central prisons, the state has 7 district jails, 99 sub-jails, a women's jail and an open jail.

=== Arunachal Pradesh ===
The state has two district jails at Itanagar and at Tezu respectively.

=== Assam ===
- Guwahati Central Jail, Guwahati
- Tezpur Central Jail, Sonitpur
- Silchar Central Jail, Cachar
- Dibrugarh Central Jail
- Jorhat Central Jail
- Nagaon Central Jail

Apart from the above-mentioned 6 central jails, Assam has 22 district jails, 1 sub-jail, an open jail and a special jail.

=== Bihar ===
- Beur Central Jail, Patna
- Central Jail, Buxar
- Central Jail, Gaya
- Central Jail, Motihari
- Central Jail, Purnea
- Special Central Jail, Bhagalpur
- Shahid Jubba Sahni Central Jail, Bhagalpur
- Shahid Khudi Ram Bose Central Jail, Muzaffarpur

The state also has 31 district jails, 17 sub-jails, a women's jail, an open jail and a special jail.

=== Chhattisgarh ===
- Raipur Central Jail, Raipur
- Jagdalpur Central Jail, Jagdalpur
- Bilaspur Central Jail, Bilaspur
- Ambikapur Central Jail, Ambikapur
- Durg Central Jail, Durg

Chhattisgarh also has 11 district jails and 12 sub-jails.

=== Goa ===
- Central Jail, Colvale
  - Sub Jail Cum Judicial Lockup, Sada, Vasco da Gama

=== Gujarat ===
- Sabarmati Central Jail, Ahmedabad
- Vadodara Central Prison, Vadodara
- Rajkot Central Prison, Rajkot
- Lajpor Central Prison, Surat

Gujarat also has 7 district jails, 11 sub-jails, a women's jail, 2 open jails and 2 special jails.

=== Haryana ===
- Central Jail, Ambala
- Central Jail-I, Hisar
- Central Jail-II, Hisar

Haryana also has 18 district jails.

=== Himachal Pradesh ===
- Model Central Jail, Kanda, Shimla
- Model Central Jail, Nahan, Sirmaur

Himachal Pradesh also has 2 district jails, 8 sub-jails, 1 borstal school and an open air jail.

=== Jammu and Kashmir ===
- Central Jail, Kotbhalwal, Jammu
- Central Jail, Kathidarwara, Srinagar

The state also has 10 district jails, 2 sub-jails and 2 correction centers.

To augment the capacity of jails, the Government is building new jails at Pulwama, Anantnag, Kishtwar, and Doda (Bhaderwah).

=== Jharkhand ===
- Birsa Munda Central Jail, Ranchi
- Lok Nayak Jai Prakash Narayan Central Jail, Hazaribagh
- Central Jail, Ghaghidh, Jamshedpur
- Central Jail, Medininagar, Palamu
- Central Jail, Deoghar
- Central Jail, Dumka
- Central Jail, Giridih

Jharkhand also has 16 District Jails, 6 Sub Jails, 1 Borstal School and 1 Open Jail cum Rehabilitation Center.

=== Karnataka ===
- Bengaluru Central Prison
- Central Prison, Belgaum
- Central Prison, Ballari (1884)
- Central Prison, Vijayapura (1887)
- Central Prison, Gulbarga
- Central Prison, Mysore(1862)
- Central Prison, Dharwad
- Central Prison, Shivamogga
- Women Central Prison, Shivamogga

Karnataka has 105 prisons including 9 Central Prisons, 21 district prisons, 30 taluk jails, 44 revenue taluk jails (sub-jails), 1 borstal school, 1 open jail, 2 special jails and 1 other jail (Juvenile Jail).

=== Kerala ===
- Kannur Central Prison, Kannur
- Viyyur Central Prison, Thrissur
- Poojappura Central Prison, Thiruvananthapuram
- Tavanur Central Prison, Tavanur, Malappuram
- Women Central Prison, Attakulangara, Thiruvananthapuram

Kerala also has 11 district jails, 16 sub-jails, 3 women's jail, 1 borstal school, 3 open jails, 16 special jails and 1 other jail.

=== Madhya Pradesh ===
- Central Jail, Indore
- Central Jail, Gwalior
- Central Jail, Jabalpur
- Central Jail, Bhopal
- Central Jail, Rewa
- Central Jail, Satna
- Central Jail, Ujjain
- Central Jail, Sagar
- Central Jail, Narsinghpur
- Central Jail, Barwani
- Central Jail, Hoshangabad

Madhya Pradesh also has 41 District Jails, 73 Sub Jails and 6 Open Jails.

=== Maharashtra ===
- Mumbai Central Jail, Mumbai
- Harsul Central Jail, Chhatrapati Sambhajinagar
- Yerwada Central Jail, Pune
- Nagpur Central Jail, Nagpur
- Nashik Road Central Jail, Nashik
- Taloja Central Jail, Navi Mumbai
- Kolhapur Central Prison, Kalamba
- Thane Central Prison, Thane
- Amaravati Central Prison, Amaravati

The state also has 29 district jails, 100 sub-jails, 1 women's jail, 1 borstal school, 13 open jails, 1 special jail and 1 other jail.

=== Manipur ===
- Manipur Central Jail, Imphal
- Manipur Central Jail, Sajiwa

There are two district jails at Churachandpur and Chandel. Both are non-functional.

There is also a sub-jail at Jiribam which is temporarily closed.

=== Meghalaya ===
Although the state has 4 district jails, it does not have any central jail.

=== Mizoram ===
- Aizawl Central Jail, Aizawl.

The state also has 6 district jails.

There are 2 district jails (District Jail at Serchhip and District Jail at Mamit) which are currently inoperative because of the lack of armed guards.

=== Nagaland ===
- Central Jail, Chümoukedima.

The state also has 10 district jails.

=== Odisha ===
- Baripada Circle Jail, Mayurbhanj
- Berhampur Circle Jail, Ganjam
- Choudwar Circle Jail, Cuttack
- Koraput Circle Jail, Koraput
- Sambalpur Circle Jail, Sambalpur

The state also has 9 district jails, 73 sub-jails, 1 women's jail, 1 open jail and 2 special jails.

=== Punjab ===
- Jalalabad Central Jail, Ferozpur
- Patiala Central Jail, Patiala
- Ludhiana Central Jail, Ludhiana
- Amritsar Central Jail, Amritsar
- Guradspur Central Jail, Gurdaspur
- Bathinda Central Jail, Bathinda
- Jalandhar Central Jail, Kapurthala
- Faridkot Central Jail, Faridkot
- Central Jail, Hoshiarpur

The state also has 7 district jails, 7 sub-jails, a women's jail (in Ludhiana), a borstal school and an open jail.

Construction work of new jails at Nabha and Mansa was nearing completion as of mid-2016.

=== Rajasthan ===
- Jaipur Central Jail, Jaipur
- Jodhpur Central Jail, Jodhpur
- Central Jail, Udaipur
- Central Jail, Bikaner
- Central Jail, Ajmer
- Central Jail, Kota
- Central Jail (Tihad), Bharatpur
- Central Jail, Sri Ganganagar
- Central Jail, Alwar

The state also has 24 district jails, 60 sub-jails, 2 women's jail, 1 borstal school, 29 open jails and a special jail.

=== Sikkim ===
- State Central Prison, Rongyek

The state also has a district prison at Namchi in South Sikkim.

One more district prison at Omchung was proposed in 2005-06.

=== Tamil Nadu ===
- Coimbatore Central Prison, Coimbatore
- Cuddalore Central Prison, Cuddalore
- Madurai Central Prison, Madurai
- Palayamkottai Central Prison, Palayamkottai
- Puzhal Central Prison I, Chennai
- Puzhal Central Prison II, Chennai
- Tiruchirappalli Central Prison, Tiruchirappalli
- Vellore Central Prison, Vellore
- Salem Central Prison, Salem

The state also has 9 district jails, 96 sub-jails, 3 women's jails, 12 borstal schools, 3 open jails and 5 special jails. Tamil Nadu Prison Department Contact details are here.

=== Telangana ===
- Chanchalguda Central Jail, Hyderabad
- Cherlapally Central Jail, Cherlapally
- Warangal Central Jail, Warangal
- Nizamabad Central Jail, Nizamabad
- Kandi Central Jail, Sangareddy

The state also has 5 district jails, 33 sub-jails, a women's jail, a borstal school, 1 open jail and 4 special jails. Telangana State Prisons Department introduced the Video Linkage System between prisons and courts for the first time in the country, which enabled the delivery of speedy justice to prisoners under trial.

=== Tripura ===
- Kendriya Sansodhanagar, Bishalgarh

The state also has 2 district jails and 10 sub-jails. One women's jail also exists in the complex of Kendriya Sansodhanagar, Tripura, Bishalgarh. A new district jail at Ambassa and a new sub-jail at Santirbazar will be opened in the near future.

=== Uttar Pradesh ===
- Naini Central jail, Allahabad
- Central Jail, Etawah
- Central Jail, Varanasi
- Central Jail bareilly 2,
- Central Jail, bareilly 1
- Central Jail, Fatehgarh
- Central jail, Agra

Uttar Pradesh has the largest prison department in India and one of the largest around the world consisting of 73 total prisons (As of 2021).

=== Uttarakhand ===
- Sitarganj Central Jail, Sitarganj

The state also has 7 district jails, 2 sub-jails and an open jail.

=== West Bengal ===
- Central Jail, Jalpaiguri
- Central Jail, Berhampore
- Central Jail, Midnapore
- Central Jail, Dum Dum,Kolkata
- Central Jail, Baruipur,Kolkata
- Central Jail, Burdwan

The state also has 12 district jails, 33 sub-jails, 1 women's jails, 2 open jails and 3 special jails.

== Union Territories ==
=== Andaman and Nicobar Islands ===
Andaman and Nicobar Islands has 1 district jail, 3 sub-jails, and a special jail.

=== Chandigarh ===
- Model Jail, Chandigarh

=== Dadra and Nagar Haveli and Daman and Diu ===
Dadra and Nagar Haveli has a sub-jail located at Silvassa. Daman and Diu have 2 special jails, one each at Daman and Diu.

=== Delhi ===
- Tihar Prison Complex (Central Jails 1-9), Janakpuri
- Rohini Central Jail (Central Jail 10), Rohini
- Mandoli Prison Complex (Central Jails 11-16), Mandoli

Delhi also has 2 Open Jails (one for male and female each) and 3 Semi Open Jails.

=== Lakshadweep ===
Lakshadweep has 4 Sub Jails.

=== Puducherry ===
- Central Prison, Kalapet, Puducherry

Puducherry also has 1 Sub Jail and 2 Special Jails.

== Decommissioned ==
The following Indian prisons have been decommissioned and demolished:

- Alipore Central Jail, Alipore
- Bankipur Central Jail, Patna
- Cellular Jail, Port Blair
- Dagshai Central Jail & Museum, Dagshai
- Freedom Park, Bangalore
- Heritage Jail Museum, Sangareddy
- Madras Central Prison, Chennai
- Musheerabad Jail, Hyderabad
- Ross Island Penal Colony, Port Blair
- Viper Island, Andaman Islands

== See also ==
- Prisons in India
