= Deo Kumar Singh =

Leader of the Indian Maoist movement

- देव कुमार सिंह
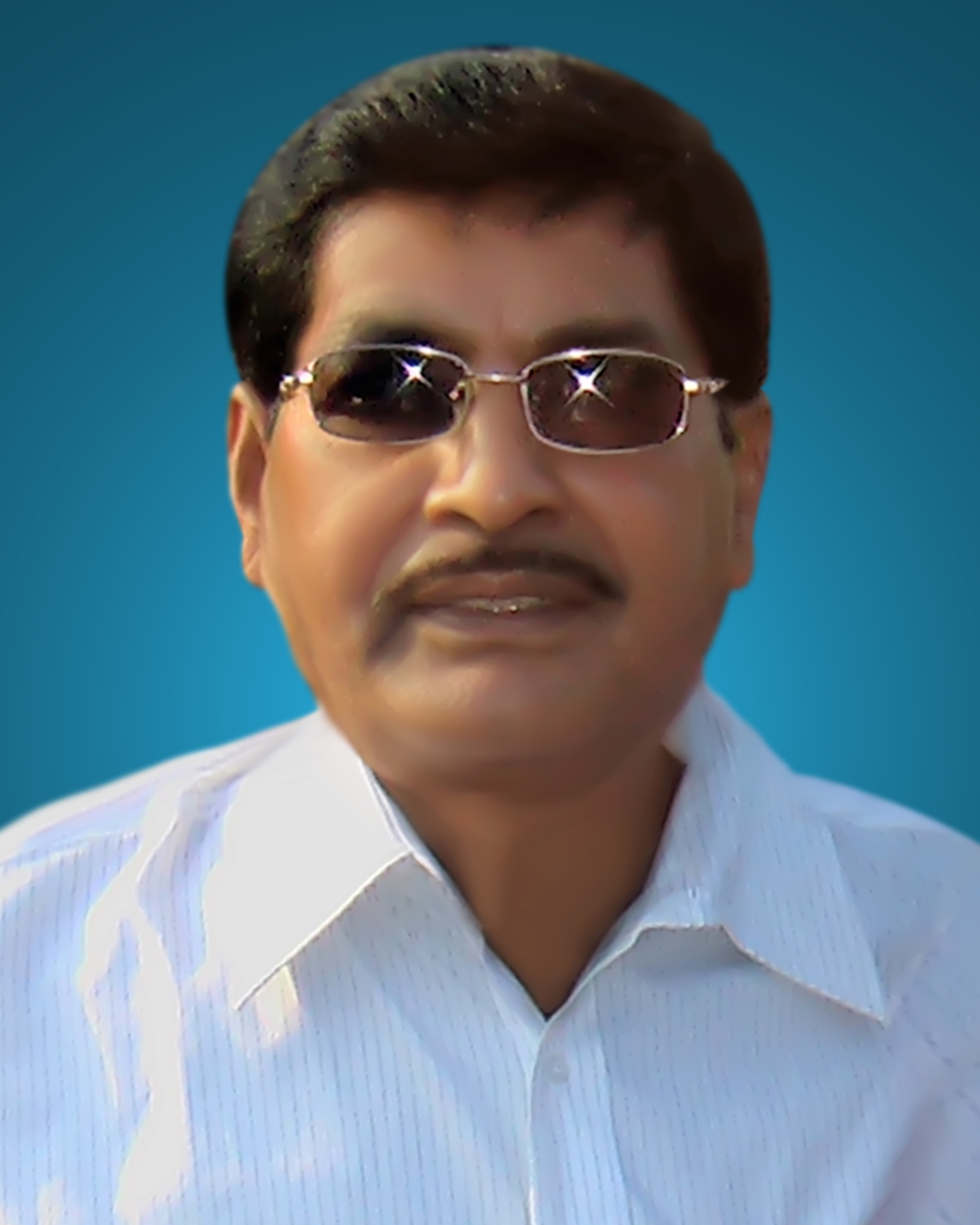
- Born: 24 November 1950; Jehanabad, Bihar, India
- Died: 21 March 2018 (aged 67); Latehar, Jharkhand, India
- Resting place: 25.267917°N 84.9872655°E
- Other names: Arvind Ji, Vikash Ji, Sujeet Ji, Nishant
- Occupations: Maoist, guerrilla warfare
- Years active: 1977–2018
- Organization(s): Politburo and Central Military Commission Member of Communist Party of India (Maoist); General Secretary of Mazdoor Kisan Sangram Samiti; Member of Central Organising Committee, Communist Party of India (Marxist–Leninist) Party Unity
- Known for: Prominent figure of the Maoist movement in India, far-left politics
- Spouse: Prabhawati Devi
- Children: 3

Deo Kumar Singh (/dɛv kuˈmɑr sɪŋ/ Hindi: देव कुमार सिंह, 24 November 1950 – 21 March 2018), commonly known by his nom de guerre Arvind Ji, Vikash Ji and Sujeet Ji, was an Indian maoist militant, who was the leader in the Indian Maoist insurgency and the Politburo Member of Communist Party of India (Maoist), a banned Organisation in India. He spent his life as a student leader, a mass organiser and later led and strategised the guerrilla warfare against the Indian state.

== Early life ==
Deo Kumar Singh was born in Sukulchak village in the Jehanabad district of Bihar, the eldest child of a middle-class family. His father, Ram Narayan Singh was a government servant and mother Ajnaso Devi was a housewife. Singh had done schooling from Jehanabad and Patna districts in Bihar. He graduated in science from College of Commerce, Arts and Science, Patna. He then married Prabhawati Devi and shortly afterwards moved to Dehri on Sone, where he started a small food business.

== Political life ==
He was known by several aliases including Arvind Ji, Vikash Ji, Sujeet Ji and Nishant. Singh started student politics in the era of Mahamaya Prasad Sinha and Jayaprakash Narayan movement. He soon entered left-wing politics under the influence of Naxalbari uprising led by Charu Majumdar and Kanu Sanyal.

He joined CPI(ML) Party Unity led by Narayan Sanyal and formed a mass organisation Mazdoor Kisan Sangram Samiti (Hindi: मजदूर किसान संग्राम समिति) to campaign for land reform and to establish minimum wages for agricultural labourers. Later he became General secretary of Mazdoor Kisan Sangram Samiti and a member of the Central Organising Committee (top functionary body) of CPI(ML) Party Unity. After the merger of CPI(ML) Party Unity, Communist Party of India (Marxist–Leninist) People's War and Maoist Communist Centre of India, a new party Communist Party of India (Maoist) (Hindi: भारत की कम्युनिस्ट पार्टी (माओवादी )) was formed on 21 September 2004; he became a member of the Central Committee and Central Military Commission. In 2013 he was elected to the politburo of the Communist Party of India (Maoist).

== Role in Maoist movement ==
Singh was one of the most wanted persons by the Indian government and nine states of India including Jharkhand, Bihar, Maharashtra and Chhattisgarh. Jharkhand government alone had announced an award of ₹ 10,000,000 for any information leading to his arrest. He was known as the mass organiser and backbone to set up and strategise guerrilla warfare under People's Liberation Guerrilla Army (India) in Indian forests against the imperialist state. He had proposed a new Strategy & Tactics, Critic Document (Hindi: आलोचना दस्तावेज), to central organising committee of CPI (ML) Party Unity which was accepted as a parallel thought of party line and played a key role in formation of Communist Party of India (Maoist) by unification of several left parties distributed across the country fighting for the same goal.

== Life in prison ==
Singh was arrested for the first time in 1990 by Bihar Police and kept as a political prisoner in Bankipur Central Jail, Patna. After three years, he was released on bail. On 12 June 2003, he was again arrested in Patna by Special Task Force and was held as a prisoner in Beur Central Jail, Patna, Jehanabad Jail and Bhagalpur Central Jail for more than two years.

== Personal life ==
Singh was affable and courteous with his mates and a charismatic person. After massacre of Arwal by police and the state ban on Mazdoor Kisan Sangram Samiti, Singh went underground; he addressed some press conferences and gave only a few interviews, which include those with Alex Perry of Time magazine and Ushinor Majumdar, a journalist from Tehelka.

== Death ==
On 21 March 2018, after two months of severe illness, Singh died of respiratory arrest and heart attack at Burha Pahar, Latehar, Jharkhand. Indian government and paramilitary forces of India wanted to see his body as an evidence of death but failed to recover, they detained his family members and did not allow them to attend the last rites. His body was cremated in Latehar forest in Jharkhand under the protection of PLGA surrounded by local people and sympathisers.

== Monument ==
After his death, a bust made of granite on top of a 24-foot high concrete pillar has been created on 0.4 acre land at his native village Sukulchak. The process is currently underway by voluntary contribution involving physical effort and financial support.

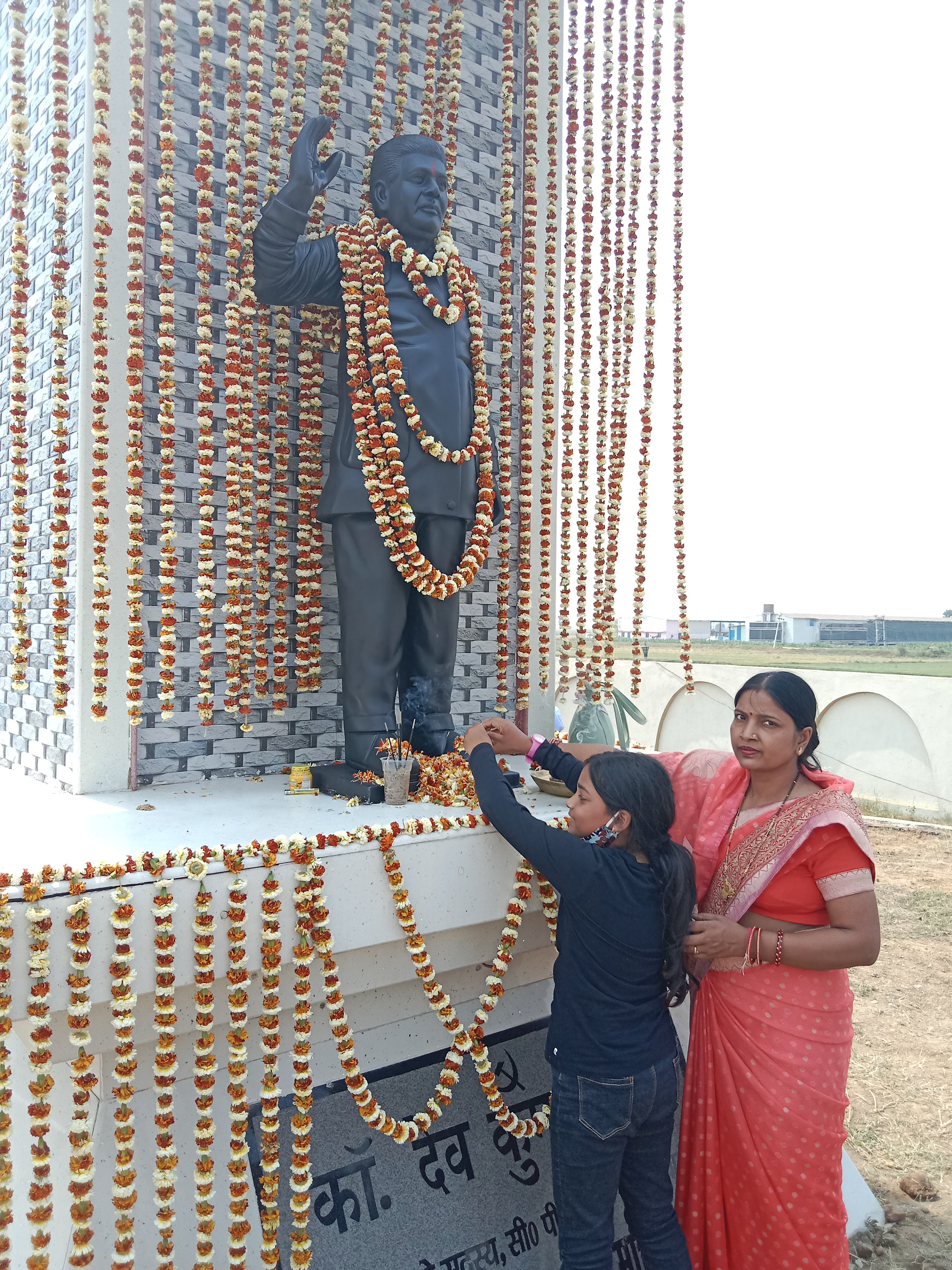
Statue of Deo Kumar Singh

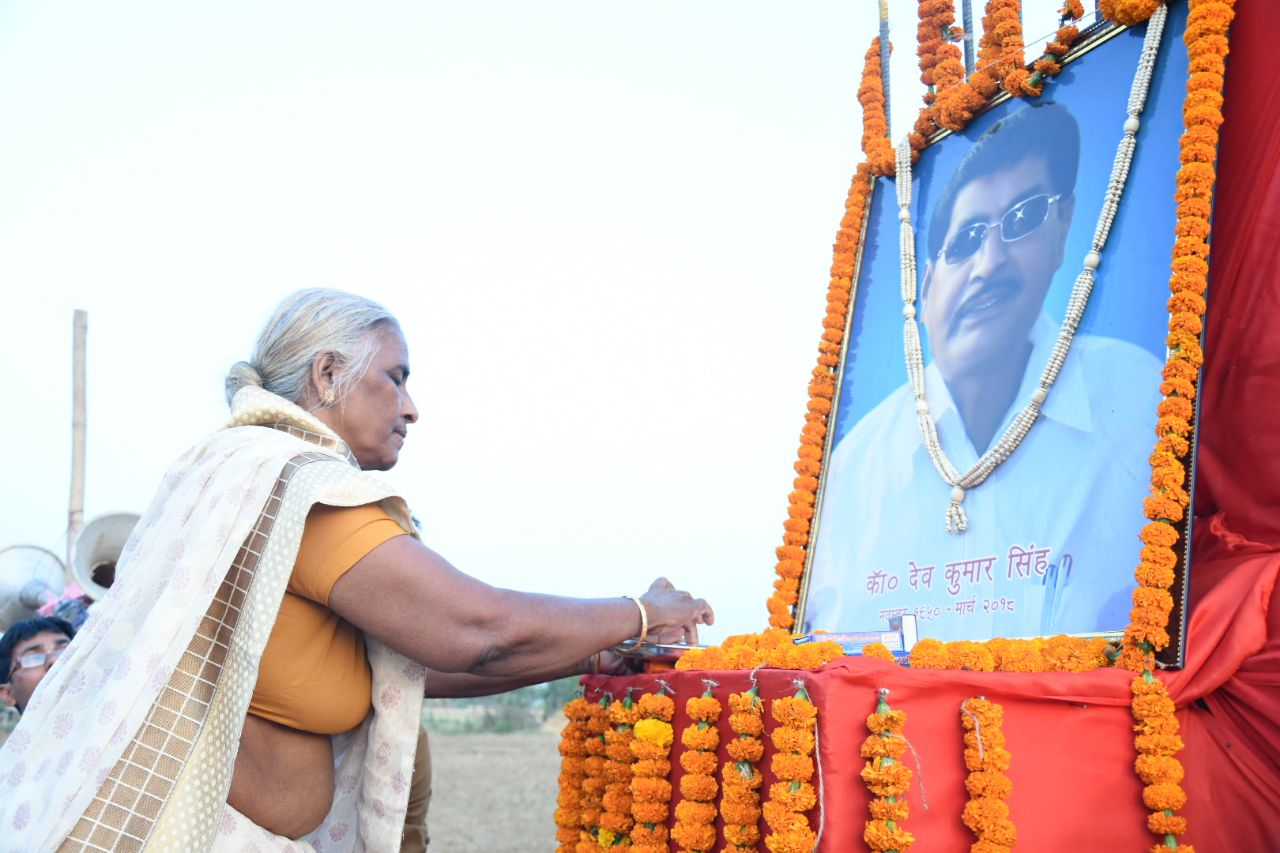
His wife Prabhawati Devi paying the last respect
