= Vijayapura Central Prison =

Prison in Karnataka, India

Central Prison, Vijayapura, one of the oldest prisons in the country, is located in a 15th-century heritage structure belonging to the Adil Shahi era. Earlier, it was known as Central Prison, Bijapur. It has a lofty Persian-style entrance, black-stoned wide walls and Arabic scriptures carved in stone slab. After the district was renamed as Vijayapura, the jail is also renamed as the Central Prison, Vijayapura. It is the oldest prison complex in Karnataka and one of the oldest jail buildings in India.

It was built by Nawab Mustafa Khan in 1640, a noble of Mohammad Adil Shah. Earlier, the jail served as an inn (sarai) for king's special guests. In 1887, British government converted the building into a jail. It was Captain Wilkinson, who suggested that this building may be converted into a jail, according to Krishna Kolhar Kulkarni, a historian and professor. The jail became a central prison in 1983. The Arabic script that welcomes the visitors at the entrance of the jail states a ‘peaceful and a safe stay’.

== New premises ==
After a proposal to move the jail to a new building on the outskirts of Vijayapura, it is expected that the jail would be shifted soon to the new premises. The new Central Prison will have capacity for 1000 inmates and a budget of Rs.100 crores is sanctioned to develop the 40-acre new facility.

== Facilities ==
The prison has a hospital in the first floor. The inn had a spacious first floor which hosted higher nobility or very rich traders now became the prison hospital. The prison also has handloom facility where prisoners are trained in the art and they also produce goods carpets and blankets. The 'jamkhanas' produced at the prison are now popular. The section which was used only for women in the old inn, is now made into a kitchen and the horse stables are converted into barracks. During COVID-19, the handloom facility produced face masks and a quarantine system was set-up by the jail superintendent Myageri, who was later facilitated by the Chief Minister.

== Capacity ==
In 2022, the jail had a capacity to hold 380 inmates but accommodates 680. In 2018, the jail had 98 per cent overcrowding which is highest in the state of Karnataka.

== Raid ==
After a raid in September 2020, three mobile phones, four sim cards, chargers and earphones were seized by the raiding team of 60 constables and seven inspectors led by Additional Superintendent of Police. The current Superintendent of Prison is KOTRESH H B

== See also ==
- List of prisons in India
- Prisons in India
