= Bankipur (disambiguation) =

Bankipur is a name used for several locations:

- Bankipur (Bengal), a former Austrian settlement in Bengal by the Ganges.
- Bankipore, a neighborhood in Patna, Bihar, India.
  - Bankipur Central Jail, a jail in Patna, Bihar, India.
- A village in Khejuri II, West Bengal, India, by the sea.
- Mirzapur-Bankipur railway station, part of the Kolkata Suburban Railway system.
