= Mazdoor Kisan Sangram Samiti =

- Leader: Deo Kumar Singh alias Arvind Ji
- Founded: 1981
- Ideology: Marxism–Leninism–Maoism
- Slogan: Proletarians of the world, unite!

Mazdoor Kisan Sangram Samiti (Hindi: मजदूर किसान संग्राम समिति, 'Worker-Peasant Struggle Association') was a mass organisation in Bihar, India. MKSS was founded in 1981 by Dr. Vinayan, Arvind Ji and other mass leaders. The following of MKSS was largely made up of Dalits.

MKSS emerged from the Jayaprakash Narayan-led anti-Emergency struggles in Bihar. Dr. Vinayan and Arvind Ji had been leaders of the JP movement and influenced by Mahamaya Prasad Sinha. They had founded MKSS to struggle for land reform and minimum wages. The Jehanabad and Gaya districts were the epicentres of the movement. The Communist Party of India (Marxist-Leninist) Unity Organisation (from 1982 onwards, the CPI(ML) Party Unity) aligned with MKSS. Effectively CPI(ML) Party Unity came to operate as the armed squad of MKSS, confronting the private armies of landlords (senas).

In 1984 the MKSS secretary Krishna Singh was killed by landlord senas. In April 1986 police opened fire on a MKSS rally in Arwal where 23 poor peasants were killed. Following the Arwal massacre MKSS was banned.

In June 1987 MKSS was divided in two. Dr. Vinayan became increasingly hostile to CPI(ML) Party Unity, citing that the killings conducted by the party damaged the image of MKSS. One MKSS faction remained loyal to Dr. Vinayan, the other led by Arvind Ji retained links to CPI(ML) Party Unity. The Dr. Vinayan faction reconstructed themselves as the Jan Mukti Andolan. CPI(ML) Party Unity reconstituted its peasant front as the Mazdoor Kisan Sangrami Parishad. However, the names 'Sangram Samiti' or simply 'Sangram' remained in day-to-day conversations in Bihar.
