= Model Jail, Chandigarh =

Prisons in India

- Interactive map of Model Jail, Chandigarh
- Location: Sector 51, Chandigarh, India; 30.7015°N 76.7411°E
- Status: Operational
- Security class: Model Jail (equivalent to Central Jail)
- Capacity: 1,120 (1,000 male + 120 female)
- Population: ~900–1,150 (varies by year)
- Opened: 1972 (as Sub Jail)
- Managed by: Chandigarh Administration, Department of Prisons

Model Jail, Chandigarh, also known as Burail Jail (after the nearby village of Burail), is a prison located in the Union Territory of Chandigarh, India. It is the principal jail serving Chandigarh and also holds prisoners from the neighbouring states of Punjab and Haryana during periods of agitation.

== History ==
The jail was initially established as a Sub Jail in 1972. It was upgraded to the status of District Jail in 1975. In January 1990, it was elevated to the status of Model Jail, equivalent to a Central Jail.

The jail is regulated under the Punjab Jail Manual. In 2022, the jail marked the Golden Jubilee of its founding, fifty years after its 1972 establishment.

== Administration and capacity ==
The Model Jail is designed with an official capacity of approximately 1,120 inmates (1,000 male and 120 female). Reported inmate populations have varied over time, with figures ranging from around 400–500 in earlier years to figures cited between 900 and 1,150 in more recent official sources.

Because it is the only jail of Model/Central Jail status in the Union Territory, it also lodges prisoners arrested in Punjab and Haryana during large-scale agitations.

== Notable inmates and incidents ==
=== VIP and political prisoners ===
Over its history, the jail has housed high-profile political prisoners, including at least two individuals who were later appointed as Governors of Indian states. In 2003, suspended Jalandhar District and Sessions Judge R. M. Gupta was lodged at the jail, drawing considerable media attention as a "VIP prisoner".

=== 2004 jailbreak ===
On the intervening night of 21–22 January 2004, four inmates escaped from Barrack No. 7 of the jail by digging a 104-foot (approximately 32-metre) tunnel. Three of the escapees—Jagtar Singh Hawara, Jagtar Singh Tara and Paramjit Singh Bheora—were convicted or accused in the assassination of former Punjab Chief Minister Beant Singh; the fourth escapee, Devi Singh, was a cook accused of murder. The escape received nationwide media coverage.

== Facilities and welfare programmes ==
The jail administration has introduced several welfare and modernisation initiatives:

- Video conferencing / virtual courts: In July 2024, 32 virtual court (VC) studios were set up to facilitate remand and trial proceedings for undertrial prisoners under the Bharatiya Nagarik Suraksha Sanhita.
- Communication access: In February 2025, STD telephone facilities were extended in the barracks to allow inmates to contact family members and relatives.
- Nav Srijan outlet: A "Millets Mithai" counter was started in January 2023 at the jail's Nav Srijan shopping outlet in Sector 22, Chandigarh, run using prisoner labour.
- Education: During its golden jubilee the jail began a literacy programme in which literate prisoners teach illiterate inmates, with the stated goal of making it the "Most Literate Jail" in the country. Other prisoners can continue their studies through distance education at an IGNOU study centre based in the jail, and an adult education programme for aged prisoners was also started.
- Modern Mulakat Room and a centralised radio and public-address system for inmates were inaugurated by the Governor of Punjab-cum-Administrator, UT Chandigarh.
- Swachh Bharat Abhiyaan: Fortnightly "Shramdaan" cleanliness drives are conducted by prisoners and staff.
- Staff training: In September 2022, the Institute of Correctional Administration, Sector 26, Chandigarh, organised an awareness workshop on prevention of sexual harassment (POSH) at the jail.
- Security modernisation: The jail has undergone security upgrades, including modern surveillance equipment, to prevent escapes, although staffing shortages have been reported.

== Prisoner releases and legal aid ==
In August 2022, as part of the "Azadi Ka Amrit Mahotsav" celebrations, the District Legal Services Authority (DLSA) of Chandigarh released 151 prisoners from the jail under the "Release UTRC@75" campaign; 114 were granted bail and 37 cases were disposed of during a Jail Lok Adalat held on 9 August. The campaign screened data on 816 undertrial prisoners (765 male, 51 female) involving 1,473 cases, of which 223 prisoners covering 420 cases were found eligible for consideration.

== COVID-19 response ==
In December 2020, an inmate of the jail received the Tinka Tinka Award for producing the highest number of face masks during the COVID-19 pandemic.

== See also ==
- List of prisons in India
- Chandigarh
- Beant Singh
