= Birsa Munda Central Jail =

Prison in Jharkhand, India

Coordinates: 23.3771°N 85.3288°E

Birsa Munda Central Jail is a prison located in Ranchi, Jharkhand.

== History ==
It was established in 1899. The British colonial authorities used the prison to detain tribal revolutionaries. The Adivasi leader Birsa Munda was jailed here in his last days. In 2005, the jail was shifted to the outskirts, to a new premises in Hotwar.

In 2015, Rs.10 crore was spent on the old brick and mortar structure and it was converted into a museum which was inaugurated by prime minister Narender Modi on 15 November 2021, Munda's birth anniversary. The museum, which has 22 life size statues of tribal leaders, is maintained by Jharkhand Urban Infrastructure Development Company (JUIDCO). The restoration work was assigned to, and completed by, the Indian Trust for Rural Heritage and Development (ITRHD).

In 2021, over 1000 inmates contracted Corona virus and the jail undertook mass vaccination of inmates and staff.

== See also ==
- List of prisons in India
- Prisons in India
