= Shaktifarm =

Shaktifarm शक्तिफार्म
- Town and region
- Location in Uttarakhand, India#Location in India Shaktifarm (India)
- Coordinates: 29.009337°N 79.648230°E
- Country: India
- State: Uttarakhand
- Division: Kumaon
- District: Udham Singh Nagar
- Tehsil: Sitarganj
- Settled: 1950s–1970s

Government
  - Type: Nagar Panchayat
  - Body: Shaktigarh Nagar Panchayat
  - Chairman: Sumit Mandal (BJP)
  - Lok Sabha MP: Ajay Bhatt (BJP)
  - MLA: Saurabh Bahuguna (BJP)

Population (2011)
  - Total: 5,374 (Shaktifarm Town) 54,356 (Shaktifarm Region)

Languages
  - • Official: Hindi
  - • Native / spoken: Bengali, Pahadi, Punjabi
- Time zone: UTC+5:30 (IST)
- PIN: 263151, 262405 (Ratanfarm sector)
- Area code: +91-5948
- Vehicle registration: UK-06

Shaktifarm (also designated as Shaktigarh) is a town and suburban agrarian region in the Udham Singh Nagar district of Uttarakhand, India. Located within the Sitarganj tehsil, civic administration is managed by the Shaktigarh Nagar Panchayat, while the broader region consists of numbered agrarian colonies and Gram Panchayats.

== History ==
The settlement was established following the partition of India between the 1950s and 1970s to rehabilitate displaced Bengali Hindu refugees from erstwhile East Pakistan. The settlers reclaimed agrarian land across the Terai belt to establish planned agricultural villages identified by sequential numbers.

For several decades, official caste and domicile records issued to settlers carried the designation "East Pakistan". In August 2021, the Uttarakhand state cabinet resolved to drop this tag from all official certificates.

== Localities ==
The Shaktifarm region is broadly organized into numbered sectors:

=== Shaktifarm sector ===
The central settlement cluster carries PIN code 263151 and runs sequentially from Shaktifarm No. 2 to No. 6:

- Gurugram (Shaktifarm No. 2)
- Dev Nagar (Shaktifarm No. 3)
- Tagore Nagar (Shaktifarm No. 4): Hosts annual community football tournaments and Durga Puja celebrations.
- Surendra Nagar (Shaktifarm No. 5): Site of the regional Charak Puja festival.
- Baikunthpur (Shaktifarm No. 1), (Shaktifarm No. 6)

=== Ratanfarm sector ===
The northern agricultural tract is designated as the Ratanfarm sector, governed under PIN code 262405 and divided into sequential numbered units:

- Nirmal Nagar (Ratanfarm No. 1)
- Arvind Nagar (Ratanfarm No. 2), (Ratanfarm No. 7), (Ratanfarm No. 8)
- Raj Nagar (Ratanfarm No. 3): Notable for hosting prominent annual Kali Puja celebrations and religious fairs within the Ratanfarm tract.

=== Surrounding villages ===
Several villages border the settlement, showing the mixed demographic makeup of the area:

- Kushmoth: Located to the northwest.
- Pipaliya, Basgar, and Tiliyapur: Farming villages home to a noticeable Sikh community.
- Govind Nagar (Padagaon): While officially registered as Govind Nagar, locals across Shaktifarm widely know it as Padagaon. Unlike most nearby rehabilitation blocks that are largely Bengali, Padagaon has a predominantly native Pahadi (Kumaoni) population.
- Rudpur (Jail Camp): Officially named Rudpur in government records, the village is colloquially called Jail Camp (or Jailcamp). This name comes from the large tract of land occupied by the Sitarganj Central Jail and the historic Sampurnanand Open Air Camp. The residential areas around the camp are locally numbered as Camp No. 1 through Camp No. 5.
- Baruwa Bagh: Located on the southern edge of the belt, the village is predominantly inhabited by the indigenous Rana Tharu community, while the settlement tract of Ratanfarm No. 9 within its revenue limits is home to a localized Bengali population.

== Demographics ==
=== Regional overview ===
The Shaktifarm area takes in both the town proper of Shaktigarh and 16 surrounding revenue villages spanning the Shaktifarm, Ratanfarm, and nearby farming belts.

In the 2011 Census of India, the total population across this combined pocket was recorded at 54,356, living in about 10,259 homes. This included 28,236 males (51.9%) and 26,120 females (48.1%).

- Sex ratio: There were 925 females for every 1,000 males across the wider area, slightly higher in the town (956) than across the 16 villages (921).
- Children (0–6 years): Children in this age bracket numbered 7,024, roughly 12.9% of the population (6,217 in rural villages and 807 in Shaktigarh town). The child sex ratio stood at roughly 946 girls per 1,000 boys (940 in the villages and 988 in town).
- Literacy: The weighted literacy rate across the whole tract is about 71.6%, with Shaktigarh town reporting 81.08% and the surrounding rural villages averaging around 70.3%.
- Workforce: Workers made up 40.9% of the local population (22,246 total workers; 19,734 in the villages and 2,512 in town).
- Castes and Tribes: Scheduled Castes make up roughly 7.3% (~3,946 people) of the population (3,581 in the rural blocks and about 365 in town). Scheduled Tribes account for around 0.6% (~329 people), almost all living in the village of Baruwa Bagh.

Population and social breakdown (2011 Census)
Indicator	16 Rural villages	Shaktigarh (Town)	Combined total
Total population	48,047	6,309	54,356
• Males	25,011	3,225	28,236
• Females	23,036	3,084	26,120
Sex ratio (females per 1,000 males)	921	956	925
Households	8,982	1,277	10,259
Children (0–6 years)	6,217 (12.9%)	807 (12.8%)	7,024 (12.9%)
• Child sex ratio	940	988	~946
Literacy rate	~70.3%	81.08%	~71.6%
Total workers	19,734 (41.1%)	2,512 (39.8%)	22,246 (40.9%)
Scheduled Castes (SC)	3,581 (7.45%)	~365 (5.79%)	~3,946 (7.3%)
Scheduled Tribes (ST)	323 (0.67%)	~6 (0.10%)	~329 (0.6%)

=== Communities and languages ===
- Communities: Most families in the central Shaktifarm and Ratanfarm blocks are Bengali Hindus whose families arrived during partition and the subsequent migration waves from East Pakistan. The border villages show a different makeup: Govind Nagar (Padagaon) has a strong local Pahadi (Kumaoni) community, settlements like Pipaliya, Basgar, and Tiliyapur are largely inhabited by Sikh farmers, and Baruwa Bagh is home to an indigenous Rana Tharu community.
- Languages: Hindi is used for local government work and in schools. In daily life and local markets, Bengali is the most common language spoken, along with Kumaoni and Punjabi.

=== Population by village ===
The villages and the town are listed below by 2011 population size:

2011 Census population by settlement
Settlement	Type	Total population
Shaktigarh	Nagar Panchayat (Town)	6,309
Baikunthpur	Revenue Village	6,095
Gurugram	Revenue Village	4,591
Govind Nagar (Padagaon)	Revenue Village	4,580
Nirmal Nagar	Revenue Village	4,504
Arvind Nagar	Revenue Village	4,347
Rudpur (Jail Camp)	Revenue Village	4,317
Tiliyapur	Revenue Village	3,792
Dev Nagar	Revenue Village	3,275
Tegor Nagar	Revenue Village	3,196
Raj Nagar	Revenue Village	2,567
Surendra Nagar	Revenue Village	1,733
Basgar	Revenue Village	1,566
Baruwa Bagh	Revenue Village	1,343
Donda	Revenue Village	839
Kushmoth	Revenue Village	654
Pipaliya	Revenue Village	648
Total	1 Town + 16 Villages	54,356

== Governance and politics ==
The town is administered locally by the Shaktigarh Nagar Panchayat. In April 2026, the state urban development department sanctioned ₹95.64 lakh for a new civic administrative building.

Electorally, Shaktifarm is part of the Sitarganj Assembly constituency, represented by state cabinet minister Saurabh Bahuguna, and the Nainital–Udhamsingh Nagar Lok Sabha constituency, represented by Member of Parliament Ajay Bhatt.

== Infrastructure and facilities ==
=== Correctional facilities ===
- Sitarganj Central Jail (incorporating the Sampurnanand Shivir / Open Prison Camp): Located within the revenue village boundaries of Rudpur along the Shaktifarm–SIIDCUL belt, this facility is among Uttarakhand's major central correctional institutions. Established originally in 1960 under undivided Uttar Pradesh, the complex includes an open prison camp where eligible inmates engage in agricultural cultivation across dedicated farmland.

=== Technical and vocational training ===
- MSME Technology Centre, Sitarganj: An autonomous central institute under the Ministry of Micro, Small and Medium Enterprises (Government of India). Located in SIIDCUL Phase-II adjacent to Rudpur village in the Shaktifarm area, it offers advanced vocational skill development, CAD/CAM technical training, and precision tooling facilities.
- Government Polytechnic Shaktifarm: A state technical institute functioning under the Directorate of Technical Education, Government of Uttarakhand, providing technical diploma programs.

=== School education ===
- PM Shri Government Inter College Shaktifarm (PMS GIC Shaktifarm): The primary government senior secondary school serving the township.
- PM Shri Atal Utkrisht Government Inter College, Rudpur (PMS AUGIC Rudpur): A prominent public secondary school catering to the adjoining rural settlements.
- Government Inter College, Gurugram: A state-run inter college located in Gurugram (Shaktifarm No. 2).
- Kashi Krishan Nityanand High School: A recognized secondary institution within the local educational administrative block.
- Green World Public School: A private co-educational senior secondary school situated in Shaktifarm.
- New Gyan Deep Public School: A private institution providing elementary and secondary schooling.

=== Banking and financial services ===
Banking and agricultural financial operations across the region are handled through key retail branches:

- State Bank of India (SBI), Shaktifarm Branch.
- Uttarakhand Gramin Bank, Devnagar Branch (Shaktifarm No. 3).
