= Dagshai =

Dagshai Dagshai & Kumarhatti
- town
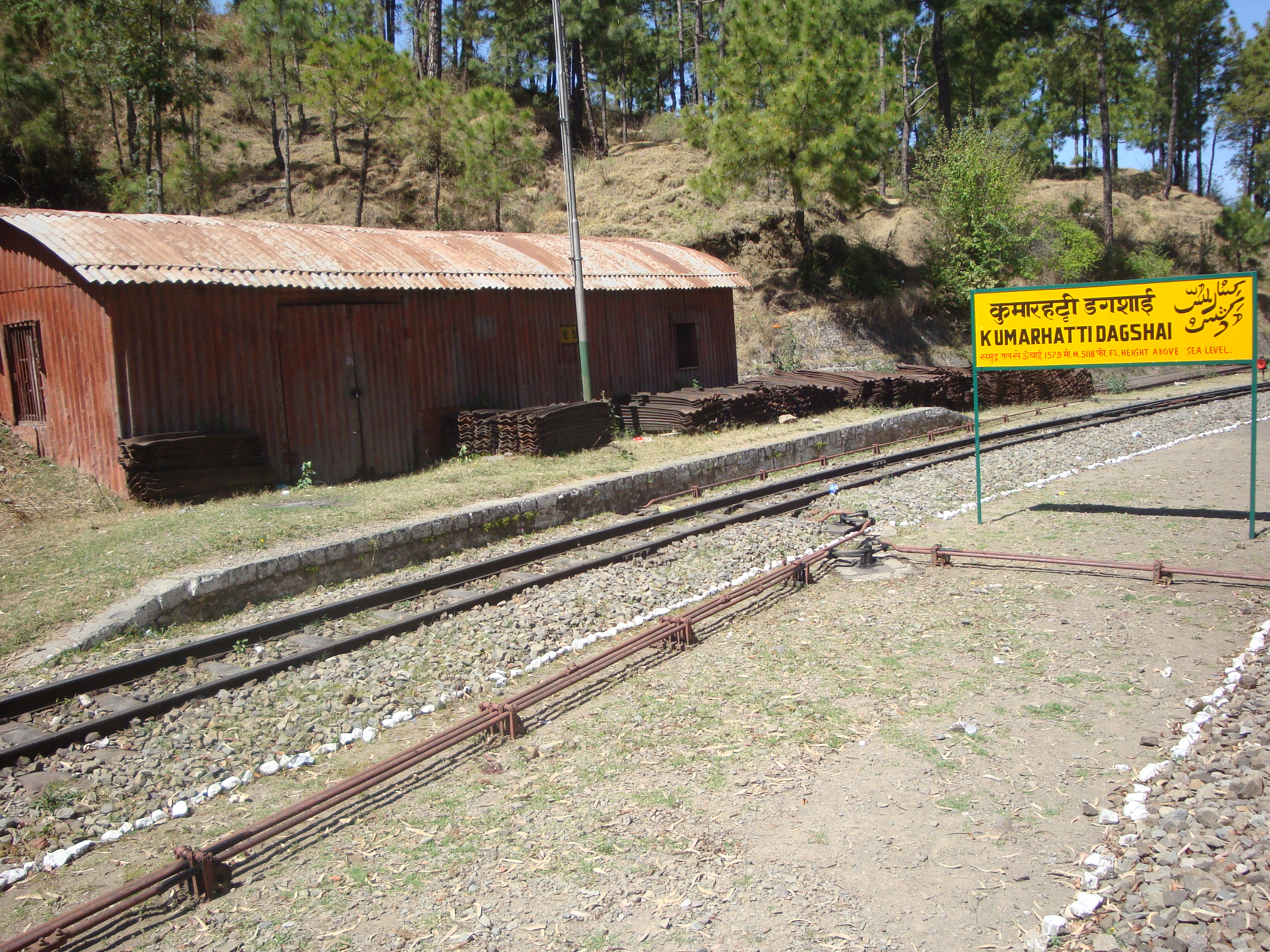
- Kumarhatti Dagshai Railway Station

- Location in Himachal Pradesh, India Dagshai (India)
- Coordinates: 30.88°N 77.05°E
- Country: India
- State: Himachal Pradesh
- District: Solan
- Elevation: 1,734 m (5,689 ft)

Population (2011)
  - Total: 2,904

Languages
  - Official: Hindi
  - Native: Mahasui (Baghati)
- Time zone: UTC+5:30 (IST)
- Vehicle registration: HP

Dagshai, also known as Daagh-e-Shahi, is one of the oldest cantonment towns in the Solan district of Himachal Pradesh, India. It is on top of a 5,689-foot (1,734-m) high hillock that stands sphinx-like astride the Kalka-Shimla Highway at a point about 11 km from Solan. It was founded in 1847 by the East India Company by securing free of cost five villages from Maharaja of Patiala aka Bhupinder Singh of Patiala. The names of these villages were Dabbi, Badhtiala, Chunawad, Jawag and Dagshai. The new cantonment was named after the last named village, as it was the largest and most strategically located. The name Dagshai, according to a popular local legend was derived from Daagh-e-Shahi. During the Moghul times a Daagh-e-Shahi (royal mark) was put on the forehead of the criminals and sent packing to the then Dagshai village. It was built by the British as a sanatorium for tuberculosis patients.

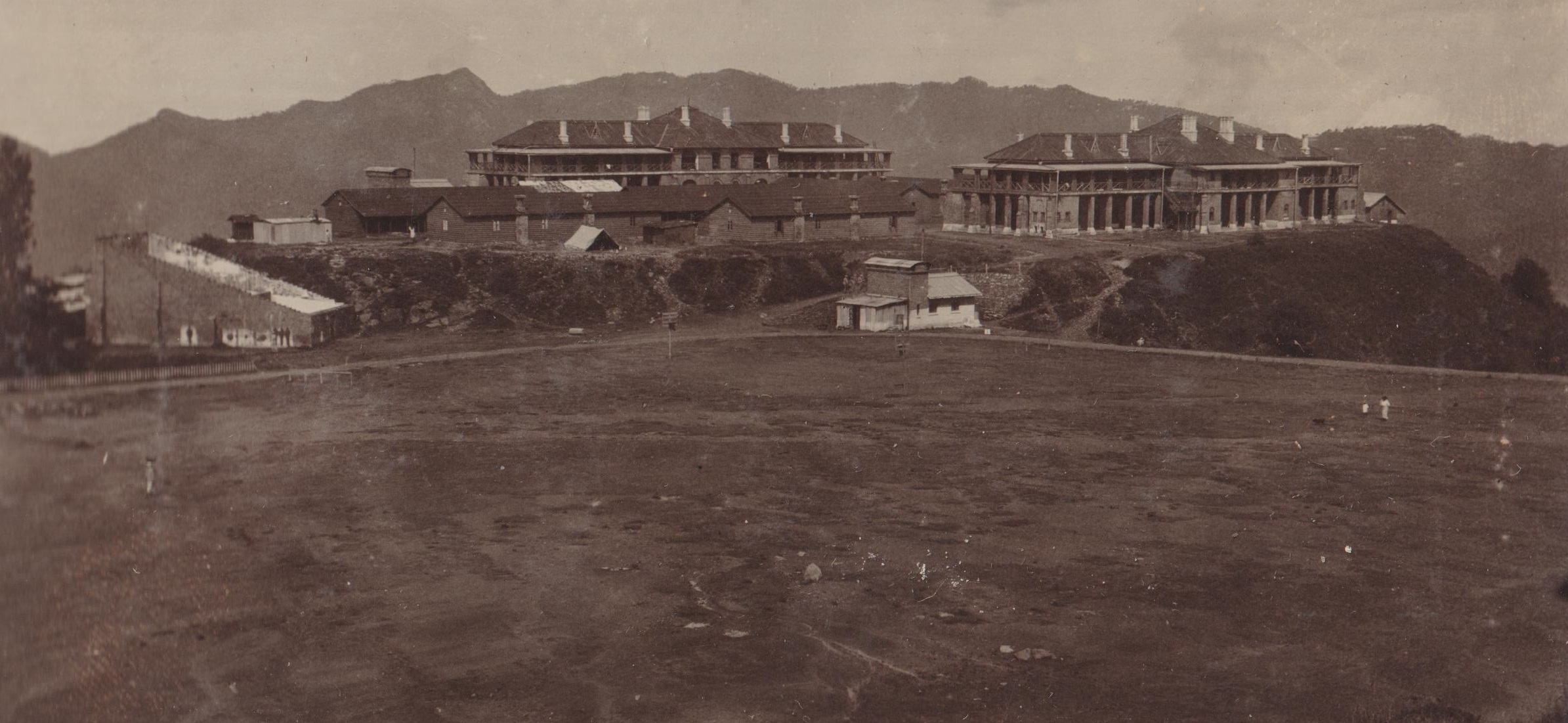
Dagshai army barracks and parade ground c. 1918

== Dagshai Central Jail & Jail Museum ==
The Dagshai Central Jail was built in 1849. It is now a museum.

== Geography ==
Dagshai is located at 30.88°N 77.05°E. It has an average elevation of 1,734 metres (5,689 ft).

== Demographics ==
As of 2001 India census, Dagshai had a population of 2751. Males constitute 62% of the population and females 38%. Dagshai has an average literacy rate of 82%, higher than the national average of 59.5%: male literacy is 88% and, female literacy is 73%. In Dagshai, 11% of the population is under 6 years of age.

== Religion (2011) ==
Sr No	Religion	Percentage as per 2011 Census
1	Hindu	94.01%
2	Sikh	3.0%
3	Christian	1.65%
4	Muslim	0.65%
5	Buddhist	0.62%
6	Jain	0.03%
7	Not stated	0.03%

== Notable schools ==
- Army Public School, Dagshai
