= Dagshai Central Jail & Museum =

- Dagshai Jail Museum
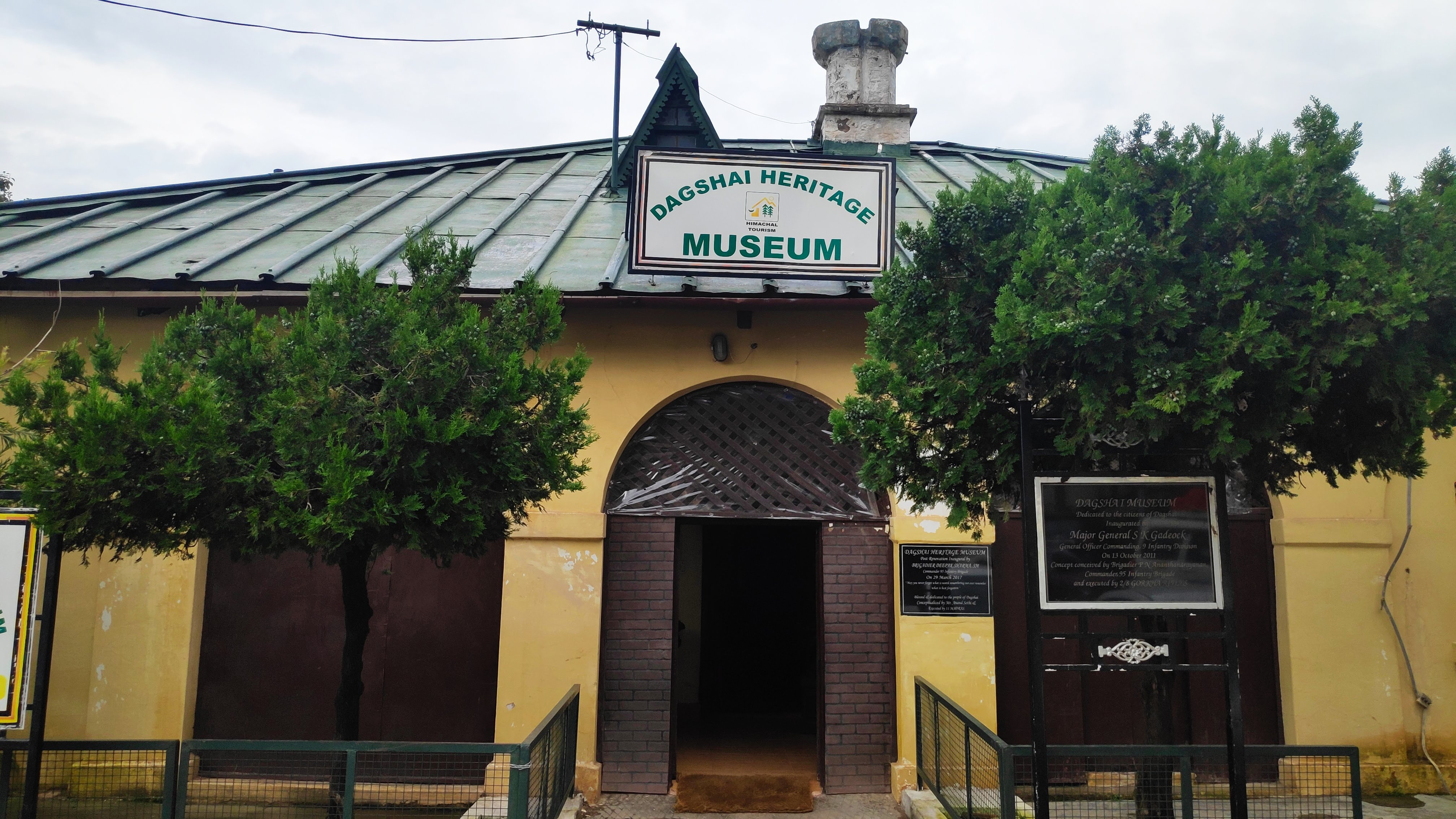
- Dagshai Museum Front Gate
- Location: Dagshai, Himachal Pradesh, India
- Coordinates: 30°53′11.896″N 77°3′2.027″W
- Type: Jail museum
- Key holdings: 54 cells, 16 were solitary imprisonment.
- Collections: Old photographs, Jail cells, fire hydrant (1865)
- Parking: Outside jail museum gate
- Website: sites.google.com/site/dagshaijailmuseum/

The Dagshai Jail Museum or Dagshai Central Jail in India was built in 1847, a T-shaped building of local stone masonry with 54 tiny cells. Apart from the Cellular Jail in the Andamans, it is the only other Indian museum which once was a jail. It is situated 6,087 feet (1,855 m) above sea level, 11 km (6.8 mi) from Solan, in Himachal Pradesh and maintained by the Engineering Wing of the Indian Army. The structure holds 54 maximum security cells, out of which 16 cells were used for severe punishments. The cells were hardly ventilated and lacked any source of natural light. The details of each cell are mentioned on title boards.

== History ==
Britishers used to keep rogue soldiers in the prison. Mahatma Gandhi spent two days there, not as a prisoner but to meet the Irish prisoners. Gandhi's assassin Nathuram Godse was kept in the prison, he was believed to be the last prisoner of this jail.

It housed 50 prisoners at most, and well after the independence of India it was converted into a museum. The establishment of the museum in 2011 was due to the drive of Kasauli's brigade commander, Brigadier Ananth Narayanan. Anand Sethi, a resident of Dagshai Hills, helped him in the curation of the museum with vintage and archival photographs and other material sourced from India, the U.K. and Ireland.

== Construction and view ==
The hamlet was founded in 1847 by the East India Company by securing five villages at no expense from the Maharaja of Patiala.

== Gallery ==
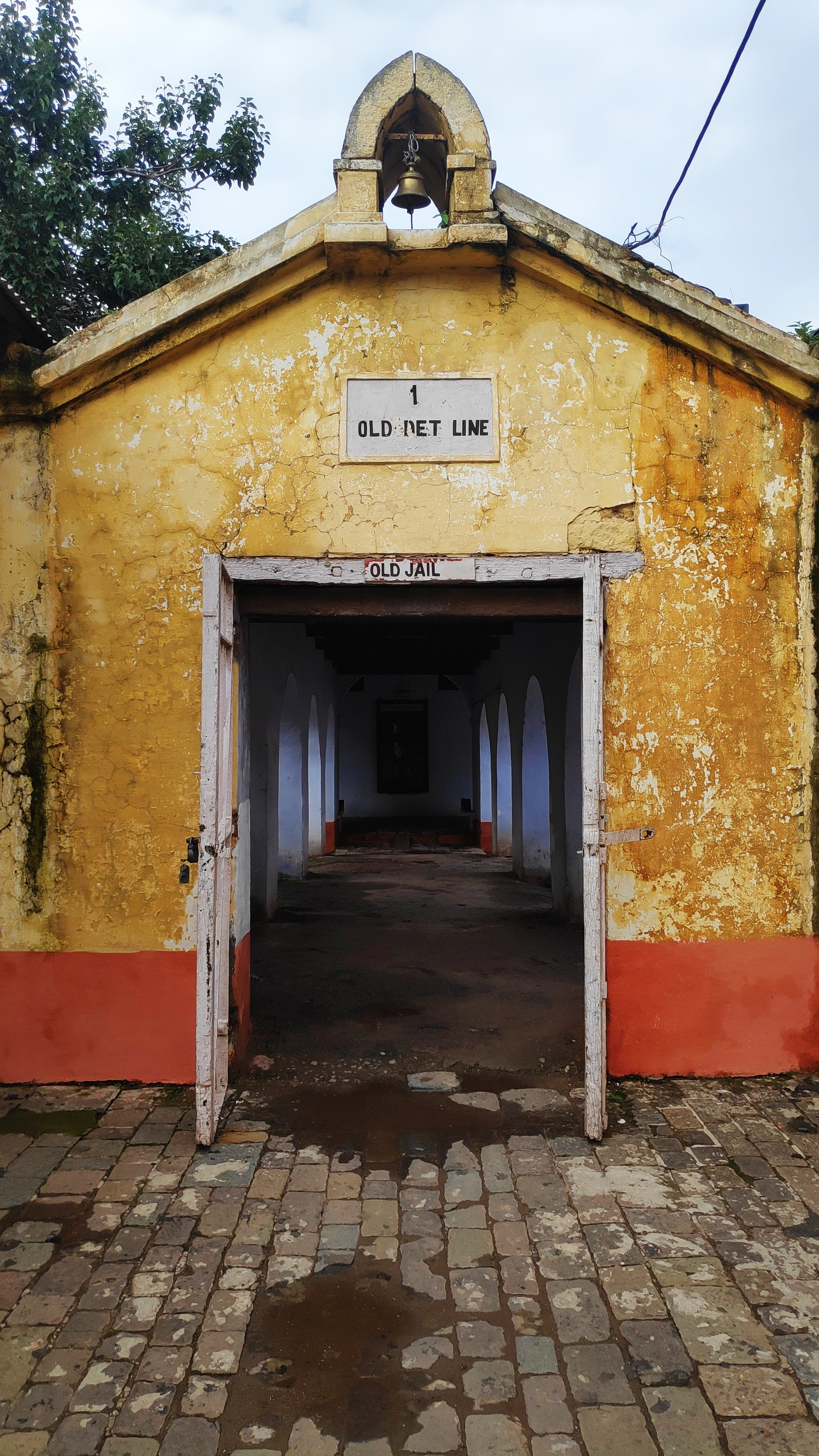

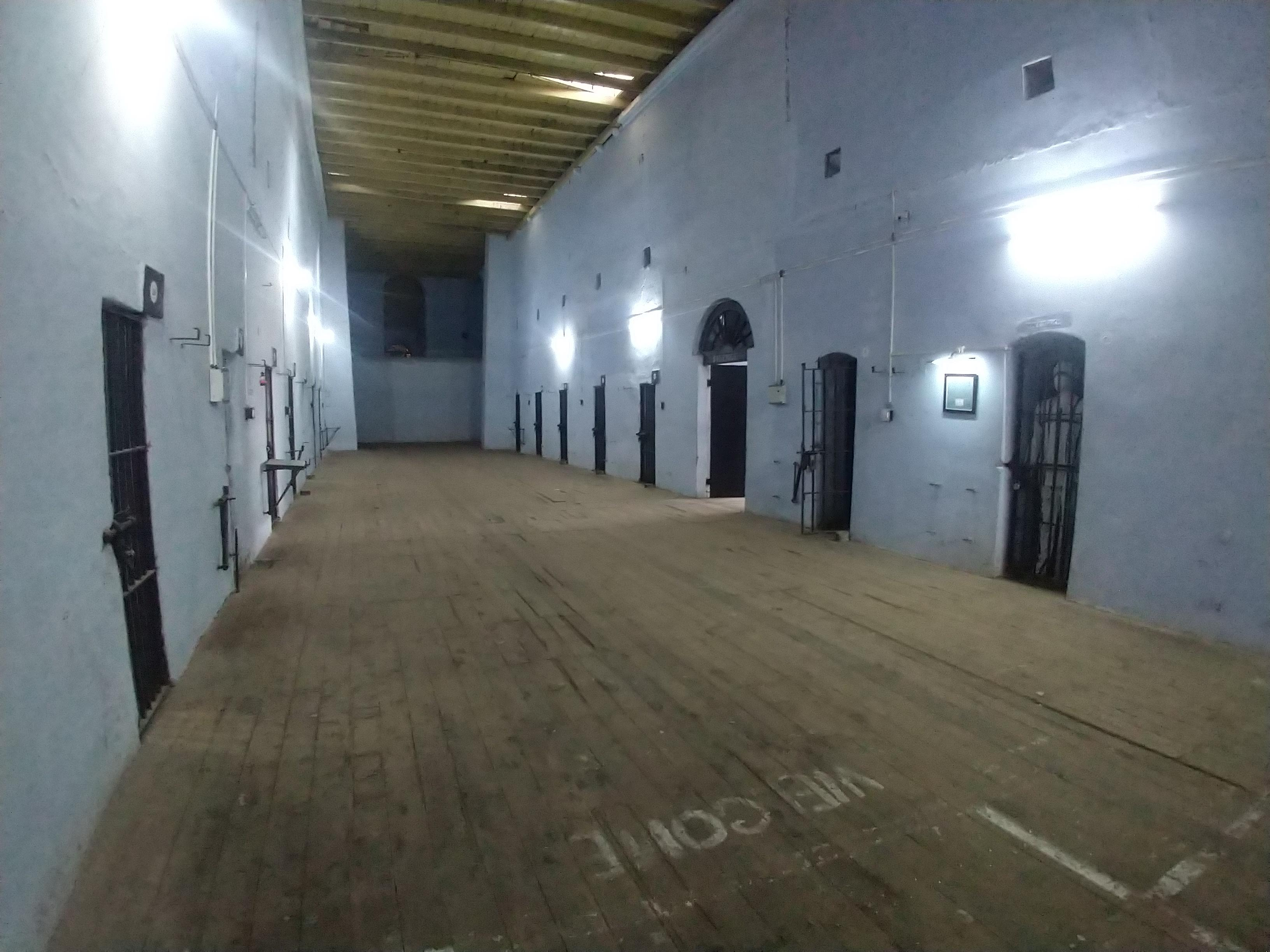

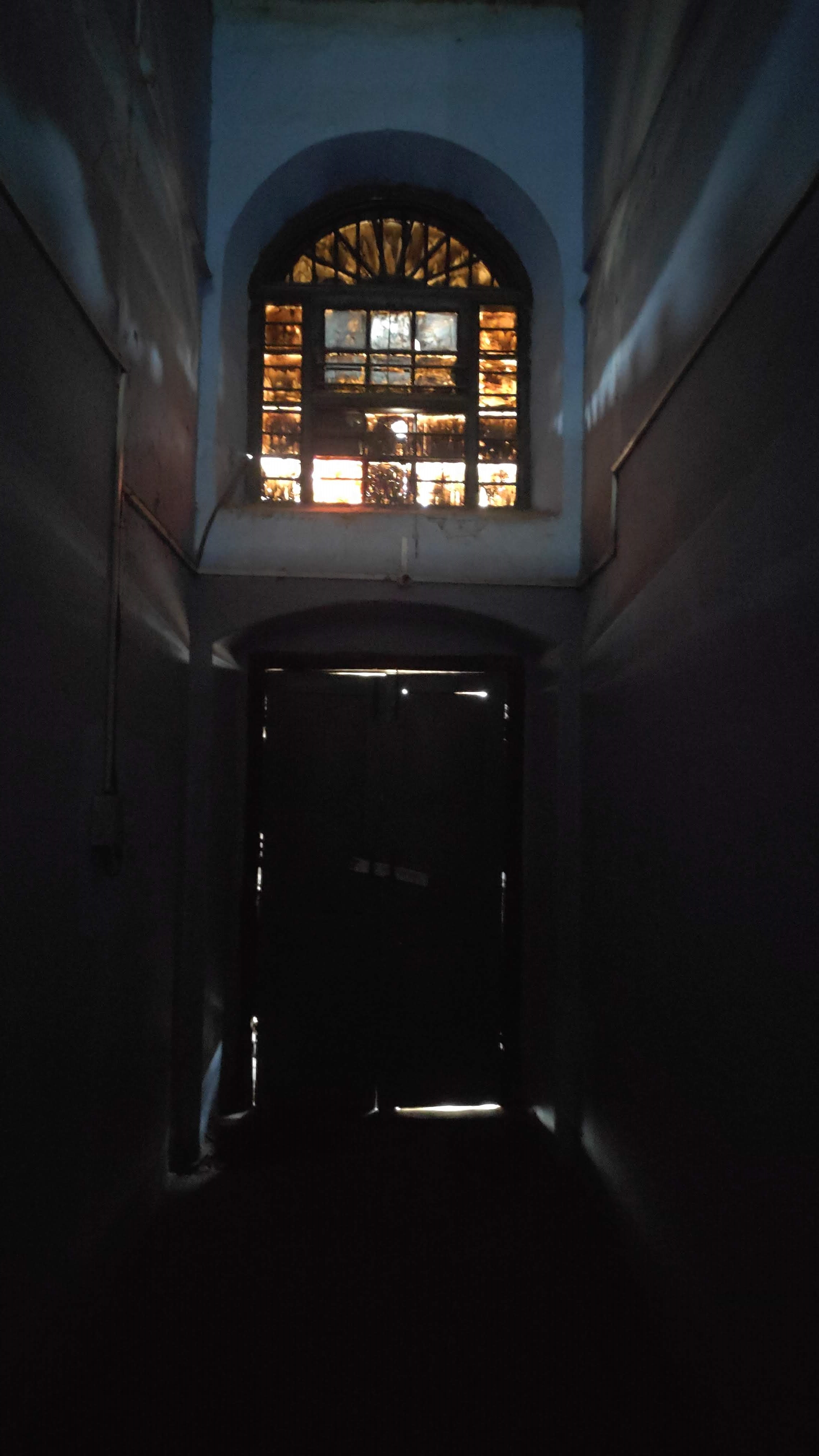

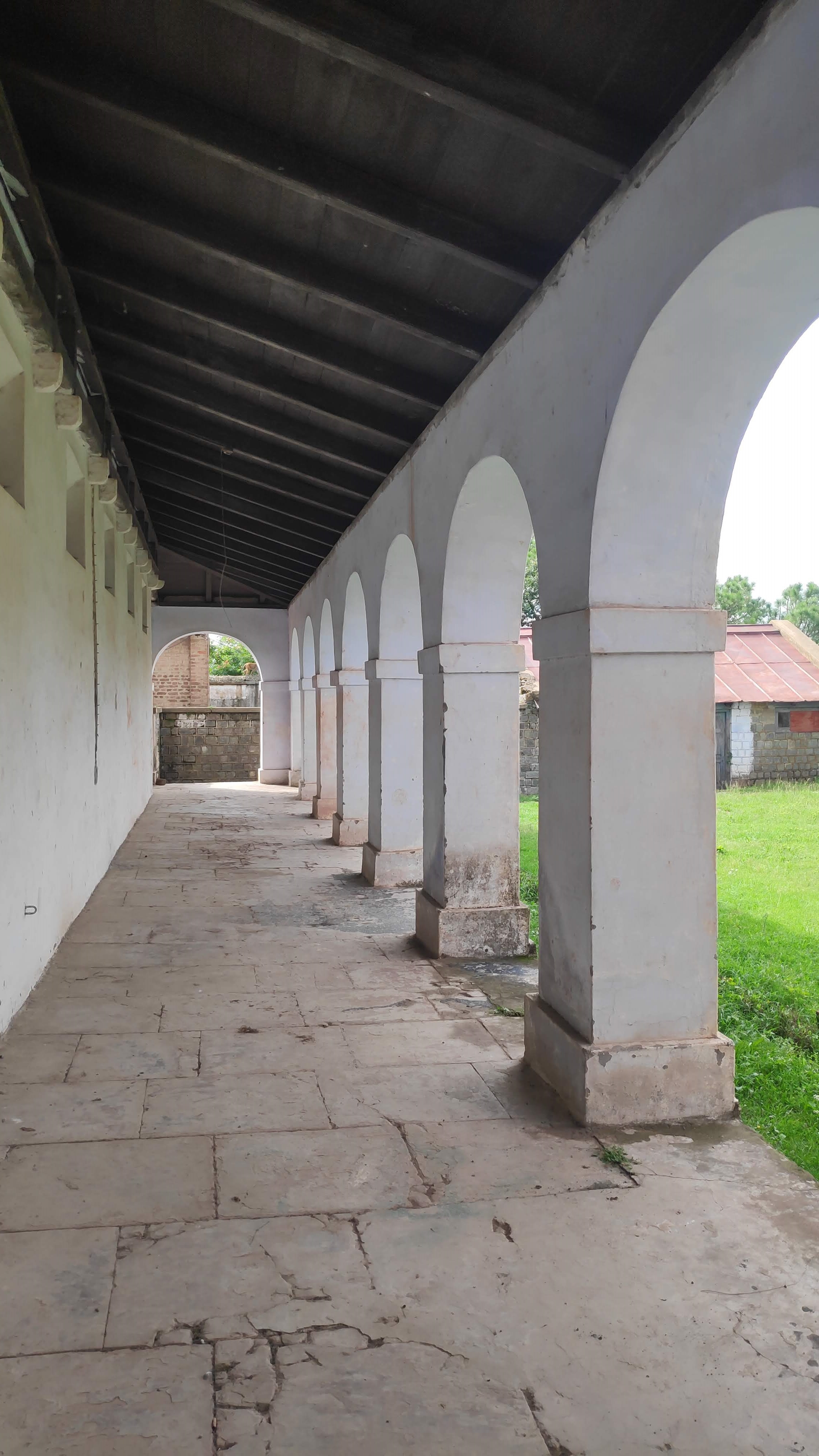

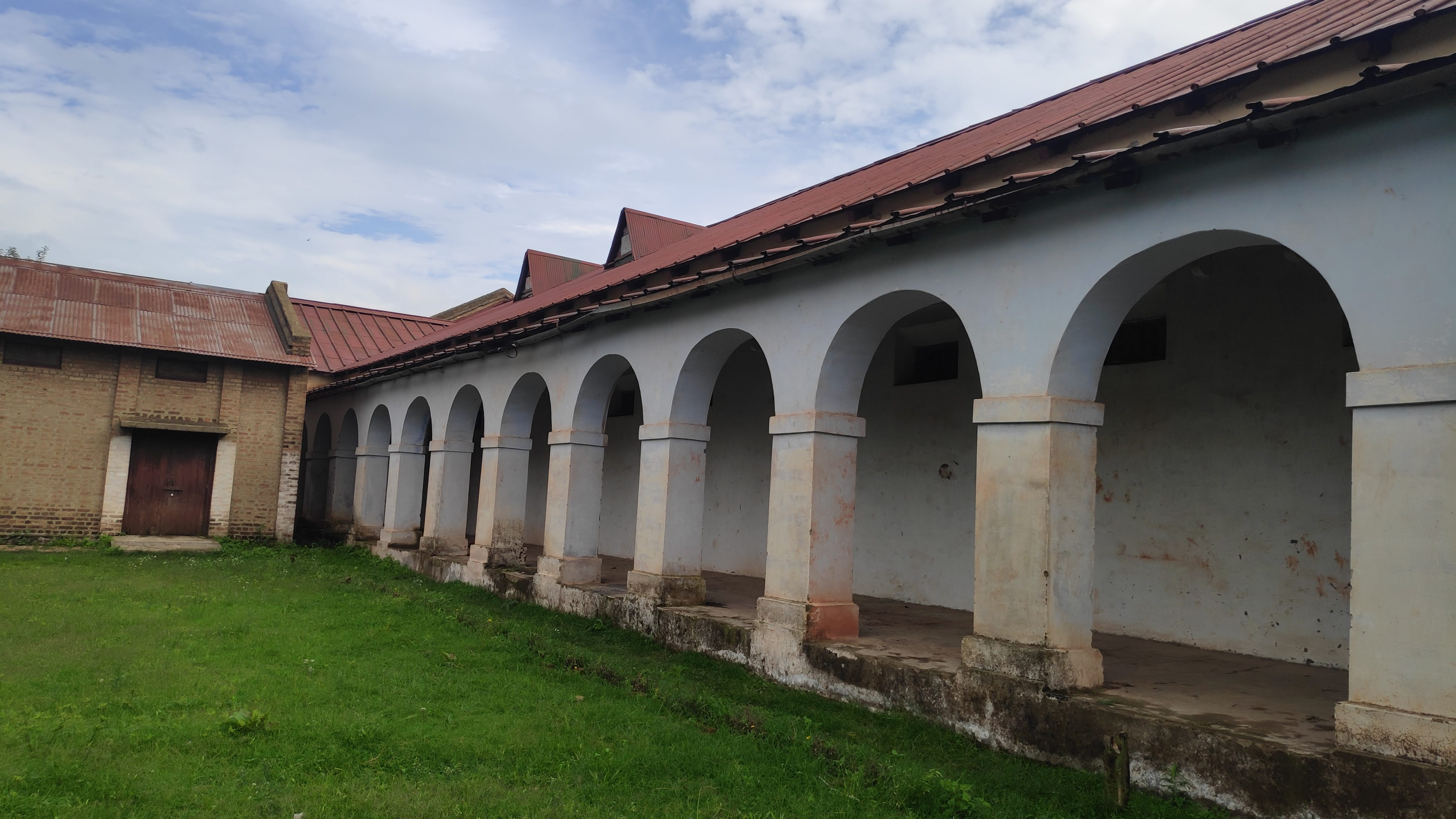

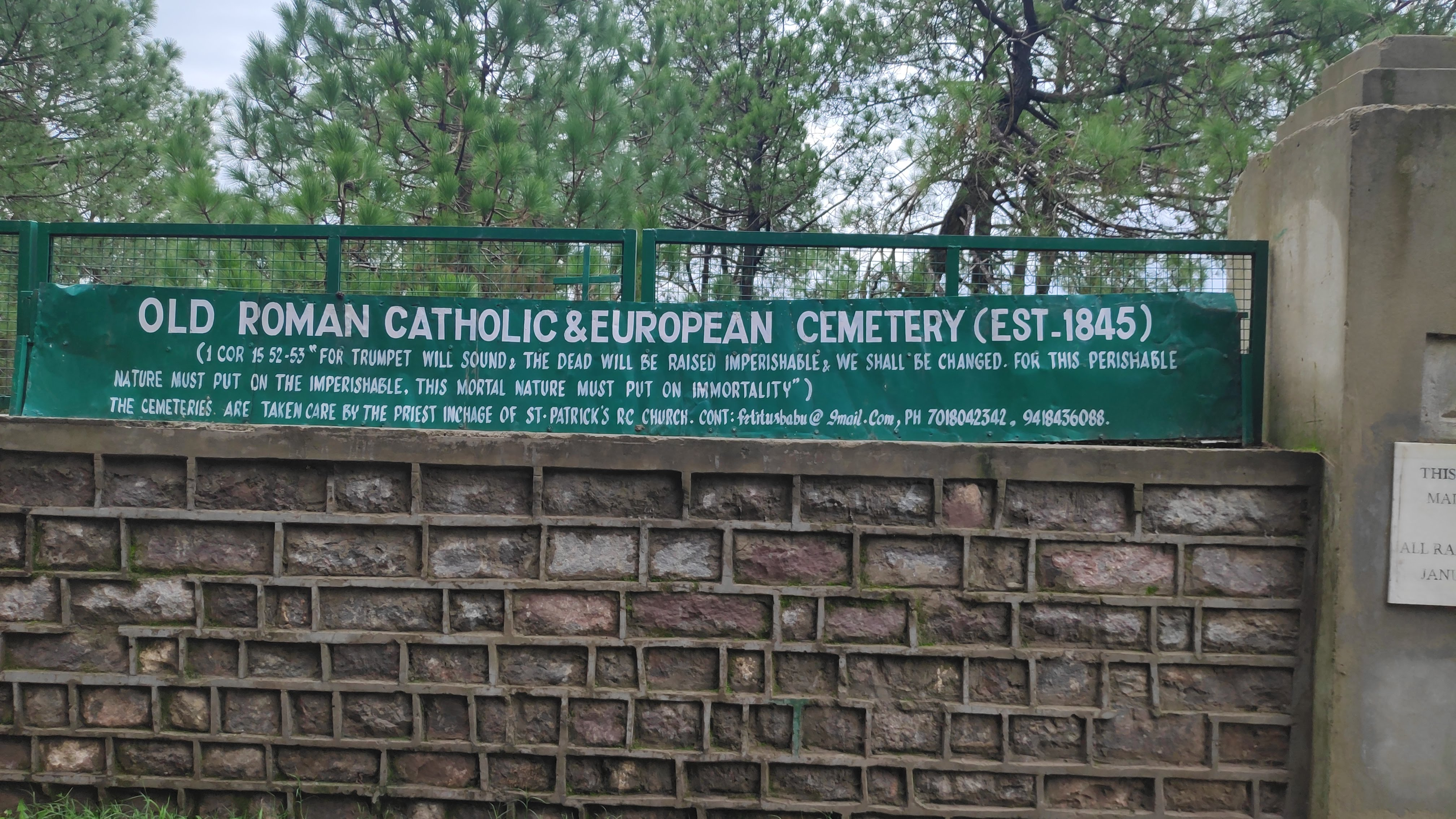

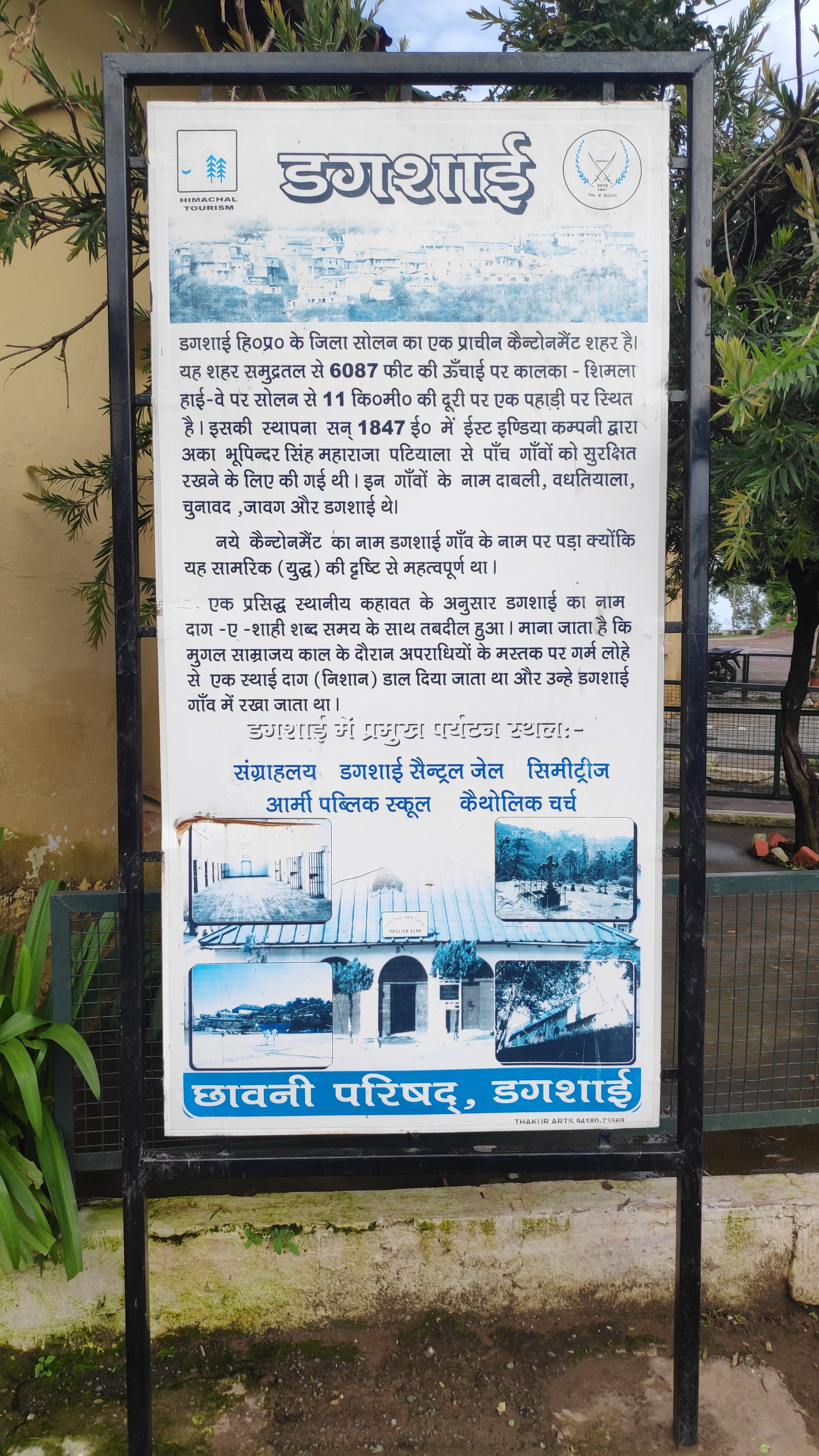

== Jail museum ==
The museums in the jail compound has old photographs of houses which recreate the history of the place and some memorabilia from the British rule period. The architecture of both the jail and the museum are typical British in green color. It was for prisoners guilty of treachery, who were subjected to cruel chastisement, barricaded windows and doors.

Apart from the jail, there is also the Dagshai Heritage museum. There are photos of steam engines, railway lines, old customs of Dagshai, a brief mention of monkey point and some old notes on what the area was like during the war times.
