= Krishna Kolhar Kulkarni =

Indian historian

Krishna Kolhar Kulkarni (born 1939) is a Kannada historian from Vijayapura. He is also a research scholar who works include extensive research on Dasa Sahitya. He wrote more than 50 books. At least 14 of them were on Dasa Sahitya. He received the Kanakashree award, in recognition of his research on Dasa Sahitya. He is the president of the Karnataka Gamaka Kala Parishat. He worked and used gamaka to popularise literature. He also served as the director of Dr. P. G. Halakatti Research Centre in Bijapur.

He hails from Kolhar village, Bijapur, which is on the banks of river Krishna, in the erstwhile Bijapur district.

Kulkarni heads the Adil Shahi Literature Translation Project. Under the project seven volumes were commissioned to be translated by January 2024. The project started by M. M. Kalaburgi was completed in 2019. Kulkarni inaugurated the first Dasa Sahitya Sammelan in Bidar. The professor also translated, the ancient history of the dynasty that ruled Bijapur from Persian to Kannada. One of his books is Kannadalli Seriruva Arabbi Persia bhasha padagalu, published by Samanvita.

He is also an irrigation activist and welcomed the final award of the Krishna Water Disputes Tribunal with former Supreme Court judge Brijesh Kumar as its head in 2014. He also opposed changing the name of the district.

== Awards ==
- Kulkarni received the Kanakashree award in 2013. The Karnataka government's annual award is given to him in recognition of his work on Dasa Sahitya.
- In 2021, he was also given the Rajyotsava award in literature category.
