= Visakhapatnam Central Prison =

Prison in Andhra Pradesh, India

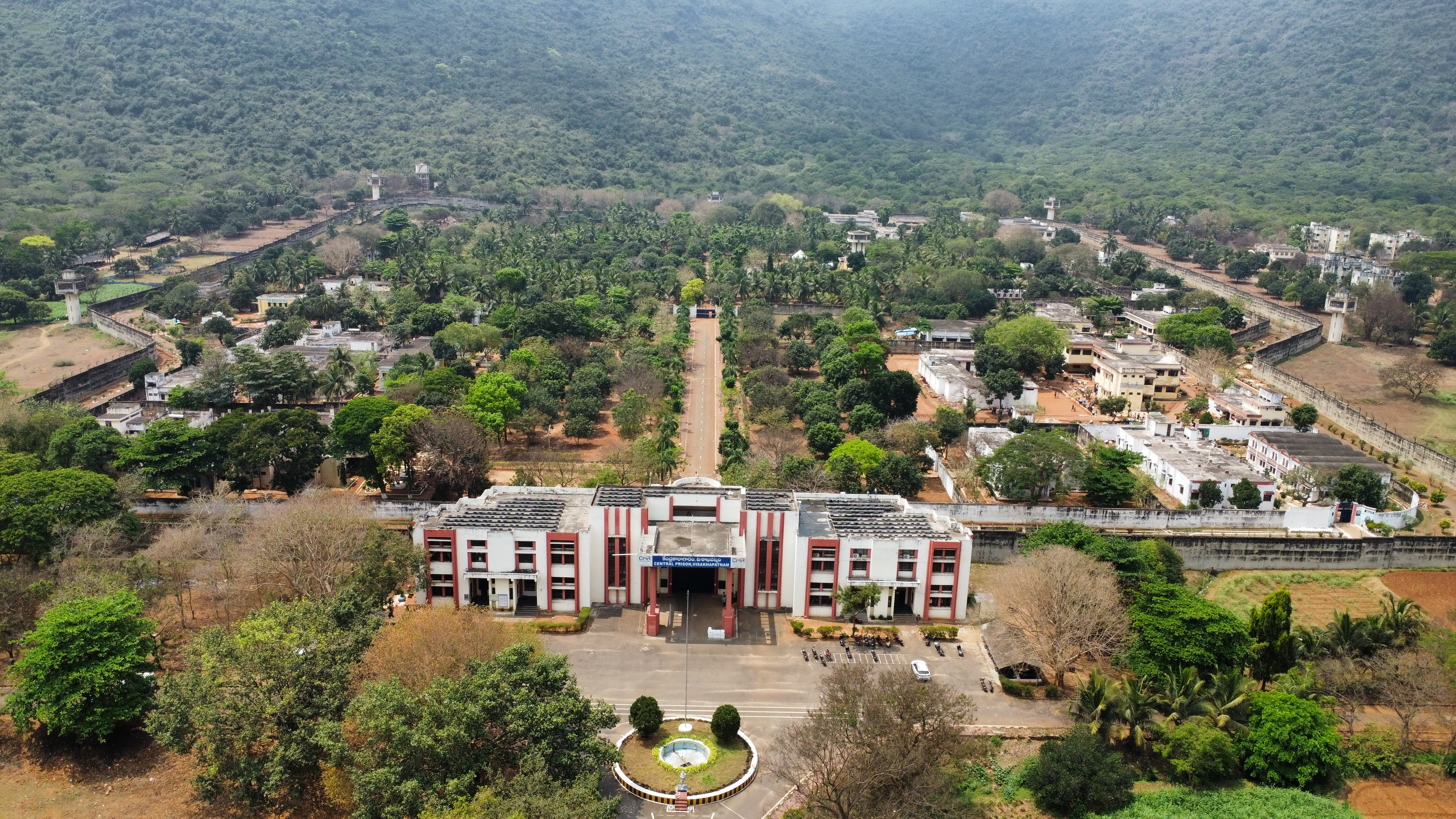
- Interactive map of Visakhapatnam Central Prison
- Location: Adavivaram, Visakhapatnam, Andhra Pradesh, India; 17.767159°N 83.280042°E
- Status: Operational
- Opened: 2001
- Managed by: Director General & Inspector General of Prisons and Correctional Services, Government of Andhra Pradesh

The Visakhapatnam Central Prison is a correctional facility in Adavivaram, Visakhapatnam, Andhra Pradesh, India. The facility is located 14 kilometres (8.7 mi) away from city center.

The old Central Prison constructed in the year 1908 in the heart of the city, next to the current Bus Station, is converted to a Central Park, and the Prison was shifted to the current location in the year 2001.

== Background ==
Visakhapatnam Central Prison, is a facility that provides custody, care, and correction of inmates and is serving the North Coastal Andhra Pradesh districts of Srikakulam, Visakhapatnam, and Vizianagaram. As per Andhra Pradesh Prison Manual 1979, Central Prison, Visakhapatnam can confine inmates who are sentenced to simple or rigorous imprisonment, under trial prisoners, civil prisoners, prisoners sentenced to death and detenues.

== Capacity ==
The capacity of the prison is 914 but as on 19 August 2023, it has 1900 inmates. Around 1500 are prisoners are booked under NDPS Act. While most of the inmates are tribals of the ASR district who were allegedly carrying ganja, some prisoners are from Odisha, Maharashtra, Tamil Nadu and Bihar. About hundred of them are female prisoners. But most of them are in on remand.

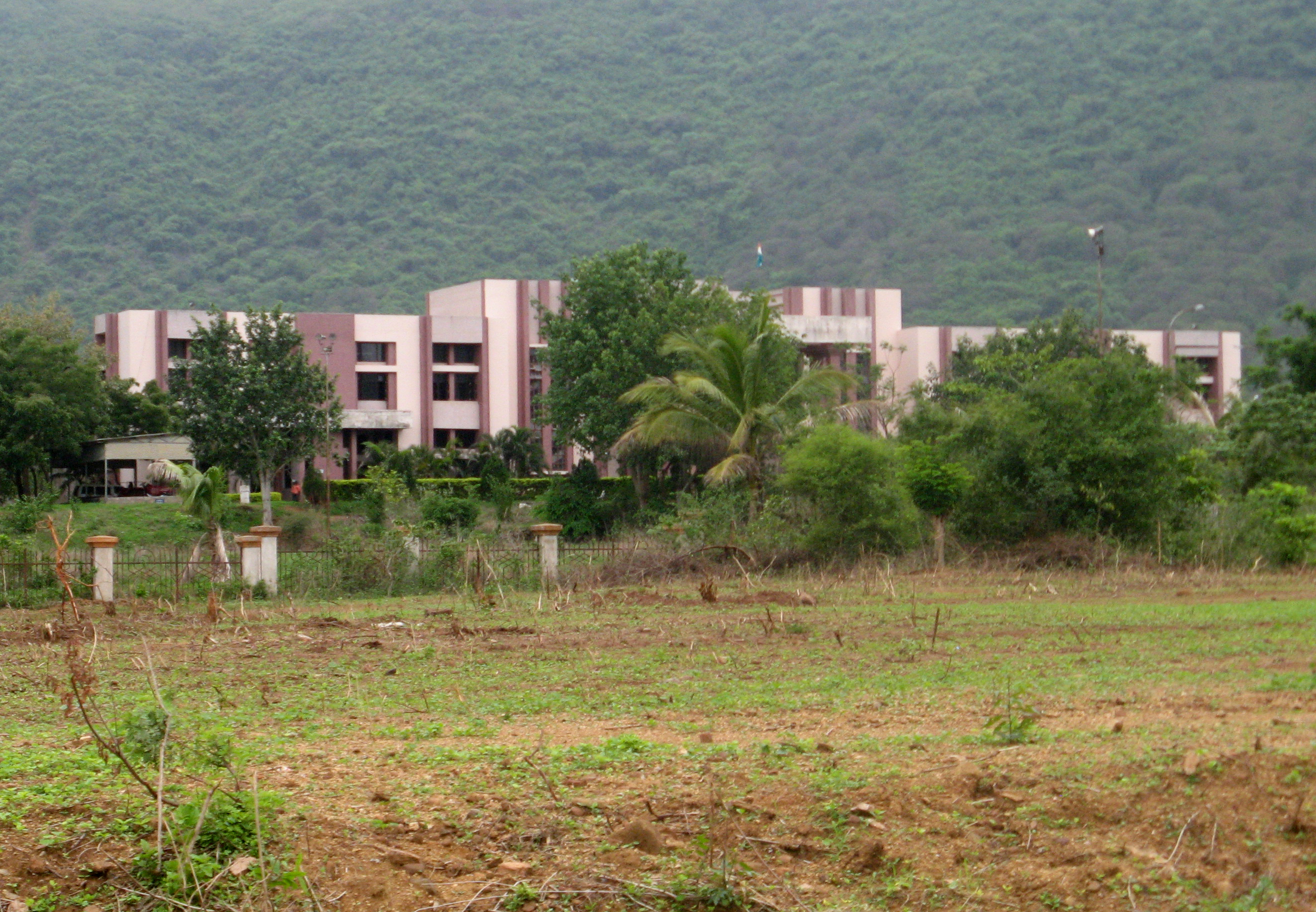
Visakhapatnam Central Jail Complex

The current superintendent of Vizag central prison is S Kishore Kumar.
