= Warangal Central Jail =

Correctional facility in India

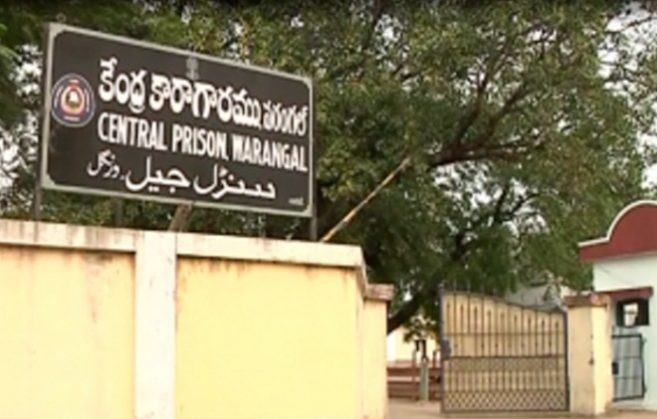
- Central Prison in Warangal
- Interactive map of Warangal Central Jail
- Location: Warangal, Telangana, India; 17.9959°N 79.5919°E
- Opened: 1885
- Managed by: Director General & Inspector General of Prisons and Correctional Services, government of Telangana

Warangal Central Jail is a prison in Warangal, Telangana, India. The facility is 150 kilometres (93 mi) from Hyderabad.

== Infrastructure ==
Warangal Central Jail is in an area spread across 64 acres (26 ha). It employs prisoners in handloom, agricultural, dairy activities etc. Jail is being shifted to adjacent to Mamnoor police battalion with 100 acres (40 ha) allocated.

Prison land has been handed over to the Telangana health department to build a multi super-specialty hospital.

== History ==
The Central Prison, Warangal, was established in 1886. The total area of the prison is 54.5 acres [CONVERT], which includes the closed prison area, quarters, and open area around the prison. The prison has a central tower with octagonal architecture. Many political prisoners were confined in this prison during the emergency, and the majority of Maoist (Naxal) prisoners and their leaders have been confined in this prison since the emergency.
