= Bankipur Central Jail =

Colonial prison in Bihar, India

The Bankipur Central Jail was a colonial prison located in Patna in the state of Bihar, India. Many notable dissidents such as Prabhat Ranjan Sarkar, Rajendra Prasad, Brajkishore Prasad, Srikrishna Sinha, Anugrah Narayan Sinha, Maulana Mazharul Haque and J. B. Kripalani, among others, were imprisoned here during the struggle for India's independence.

The Central Jail was shifted from Bankipur to Beur in Patna in early 1960s by the then chief minister of Bihar, Pandit Binodanand Jha. Later, the prison was demolished and a Buddha Park constructed in the same area.

== See also ==
- Beur Central Jail
- List of prisons in India
