= Sitarganj Central Jail =

Prison in Uttarakhand, India

- Location in Uttarakhand
- Location: Shaktifarm-Sidcul Road, Rudpur-Lalarkhas, Shaktifarm (Sitarganj); 29.032°N 79.676°E
- Status: Operational
- Security class: minimum-maximum
- Capacity: 552
- Opened: 1960
- Managed by: Uttarakhand Department of Prison, Government of Uttarakhand
- Website: www.prison.uk.gov.in

Sitarganj Central Jail is a correctional facility in Shaktifarm (Sitarganj), Uttarakhand, India. The facility is located 4 kilometres (2.5 mi) away from Shaktifarm town and 14 kilometres (8.7 mi) away from Sitarganj town.

== History ==
The Sitarganj Central Jail was established in 1960. Currently it confines 854 prisoners. It is nearby the Sampurnanand Open Jail Camp, which is among the 28 open jails in India.

== Incidents ==
In 2019 Sitarganj Central Jail was in news for more than a hundred of inmates seeking mercy killing because of the delay in their trail and sentencing.

During the COVID-19 pandemic in Uttarakhand, 205 inmates in the jail were found infected with coronavirus.

In a two-day long inspection drive in 2022, 66 mobile phones and chargers that were being used for gangster activities, were recovered from the jail.

13 accused in 2024 Haldwani violence are currently lodged in Sitarganj Central Jail.
