= Beur Central Jail =

Prison in Patna, Bihar, India

- Location in Patna Location in Bihar Location in India
- Location: Kisan Colony, Anisabad, Patna, Bihar 800002, India; 25°34′26″N 85°5′46″E
- Status: Operating
- Security class: Maximum
- Managed by: Government of Bihar

Beur Central Jail is the main prison of Bihar state of India and is located in Patna.

== See also ==
- List of prisons in India
