= Flag of Ba'athist Iraq =

National flag of Iraq (1963–2008)

Iraq
- Flag of the United Arab Republic with an additional star to represent Iraq
- Use: National flag and ensign
- Proportion: 2:3
- Adopted: 1963; 63 years ago 2012; 14 years ago (by Iraqi Sunni Arabs)
- Relinquished: 1991; 35 years ago (as primary national flag); 2008; 18 years ago (all variants)
- Design: A horizontal tricolour of red, white, and black, charged with 3 equal stars, centered on the white stripe
- Designed by: Jawad Saleem
- Flag of the Ba'ath Party
- Use: Flag of the Arab Revolt used as a Party symbol
- Adopted: 1963; 63 years ago
- Relinquished: 2003; 23 years ago (Invasion of Iraq)

The version of the flag of the United Arab Republic used in Iraq, commonly known as the flag of Ba'athist Iraq, flag of Saddam's Iraq, and in modern times as the flag of Iraqi Sunni Arabs, was the national flag of Iraq from 1963 until 2008, originally intended for the admission of Iraq into Gamal Abdel Nasser's United Arab Republic by the ruling Arab Socialist Union party. Following the coup in July 1968, the flag would continue to be used during the rule of the Iraqi regional branch of the Arab Socialist Ba'ath Party.

The flag is most strongly associated with the rule of President Saddam Hussein as it was the flag of the nation during major conflicts of Cold War Iraqi history such as the Iran–Iraq War and the Gulf War. A modified version of the flag remained in use after the Gulf War, with a version said to contain Saddam's handwriting being used up until the American invasion of Iraq.

The flag was based on the design of the Flag of Egypt that was originally introduced by Gamal Abdel Nasser during the 1952 Egyptian Revolution, now known as the Arab Liberation Flag featuring a red, white, and black triband bearing three green stars. At adoption, the three stars were said to represent the three nations of Egypt, Syria and Iraq.

Following its official replacement in 2008, the flag is often associated with Iraqi Sunni Arab autonomy movements such as the Sunni Region and Ba'athist insurgency groups operating within the country.

== Origins ==
flag of the United Arab Republic (1958–1971) – which formed the basis of the Flag of Ba'athist Iraq

Egyptian president Gamal Abdel Nasser and his Arab socialist variant of Pan-Arabist ideology, known as "Nasserism" gained prominence in Iraq following Egypt's victory in the Suez Crisis, as Pan-Arab sentiment began to arise throughout the Arab world.

These sentiments would create a significant Egyptian-leaning opposition consisting mainly of Sunni Arabs towards reigning Iraqi president Abdel Karim Qasim's policy of a multiethnic anti-Egyptian Iraqi nationalism known as "Qasimism" that directly contradicted Nasserist values of Arab dominance of the state. These groups often flew the flag of Nasser's UAR in their demonstrations, as the ideology positioned the state as the nation state of all Arabs, including Iraqis. The constant exposure of the Iraqi public towards the Nasserist flag only increased its popularity as a symbol against Qasim's administration among Arab Iraqis.

An early example of underground Nasserist organized resistance against the Iraqi state was the Arab Struggle Party, whose poor treatment by the Iraqi central government would lead to Nasser funding Kurdish rebellions in the north of the country.

The conflict between the reigning Qasimist regime and the Sunni Arab Nasserists culminated in the 1959 Mosul riots which were caused by Iraqi Sunni Arab rebels who wished to depose the then Iraqi prime minister, and install an Arab nationalist government which would then join the Republic of Iraq with the United Arab Republic.

Following these riots, the three-star flag was initially conceived. The design was made to include another star to the flag of the United Arab Republic to represent Iraq's place within a reformed union. The flag is believed to have been originally designed and proposed by Jawad Saleem, a Turkish-born artist with origins in Mosul who also designed and sculpted the Freedom Monument in Baghdad, originally as a tribute to Qasim's revolution. Saleem died in 1961 before its official adoption.

The original two-star version of the United Arab Republic flag continued to be used in modern Iraq by the Nasserist Socialist Vanguard Party, a small secular Sunni Arab party that intends to be a successor to the original Nasserist parties of Iraq.

== History ==
=== Adoption as the national flag ===
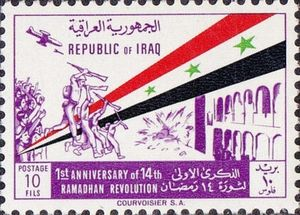
Postage stamp commemorating the Ramadan Revolution, showcasing the 1963 flag

After the 1963 Ramadan Revolution led to the overthrow of Qasim, the new government adopted the three-star variant of the United Arab Republic flag as the national flag to represent the Nasserist ideology that had now taken power in the country. This decision was endorsed by President Abdul Salam Arif, officially replacing the flag adopted by Qasim on July 31 of 1963 with Law 28 of 1963.

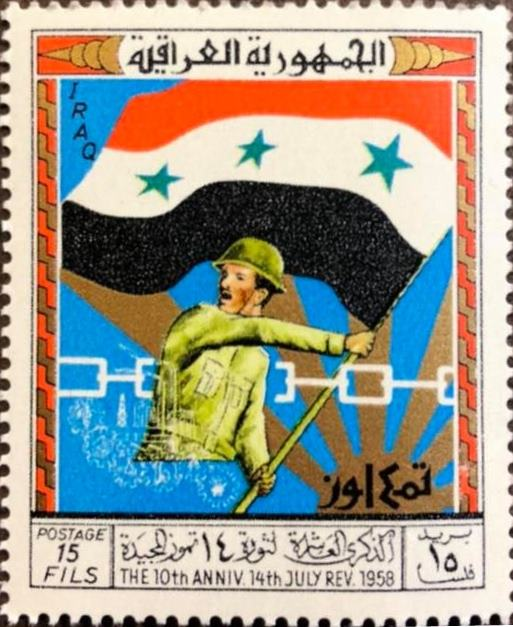
The flag seen on a propaganda stamp (1969)

In a move symbolising support for a reformed UAR, Ba'athist Syria also adopted this flag as its national flag with slightly different proportions until 1971, when it replaced the stars with the Hawk of Quraish due to its membership in the Federation of Arab Republics. The continued popularity of a reformed United Arab Republic would be crushed in Syria, as pro-Nasserists were purged from the Syrian military and cabinet. In response, large pro-Nasser riots erupted in Damascus and Aleppo but were crushed with 50 rioters killed. A pro-Nasser coup attempt on 18 July 1963 in Syria also ended unsuccessfully. Hundreds of people were killed or wounded in an attempt to take over the Damascus radio station and army headquarters, and 27 rebel officers were summarily executed. Nasser then formally withdrew from the union agreement, denouncing the Syrian Ba'athists as "fascists and murderers". Further making the possibility of the creation of the ideological union state that the flag was originally intended for appear as a less feasible reality for the leadership of Iraq.

In 1964, Egypt, Iraq and North Yemen formed a Unified Political Command in order to prepare the gradual merger in a new United Arab Republic. However, both projects failed in 1966 and 1967.

These ideological conflicts with other Arab states and the continued failure by the Iraqi government to merge with the other states would lead to the official meaning of the flag changing. During his rule, President Saddam Hussein made two significant changes to the 1963 flag. First, he reinterpreted the three stars in the Flag Law No. 33 of 1986 to represent the Ba'ath Party's motto Waḥda, Ḥurriyya, Ishtirākiyya ("unity, freedom, and socialism").

=== Gulf War and Faith Campaign ===
Flag of Ba'athist Iraq (13 January 1991 – 15 August 2004)

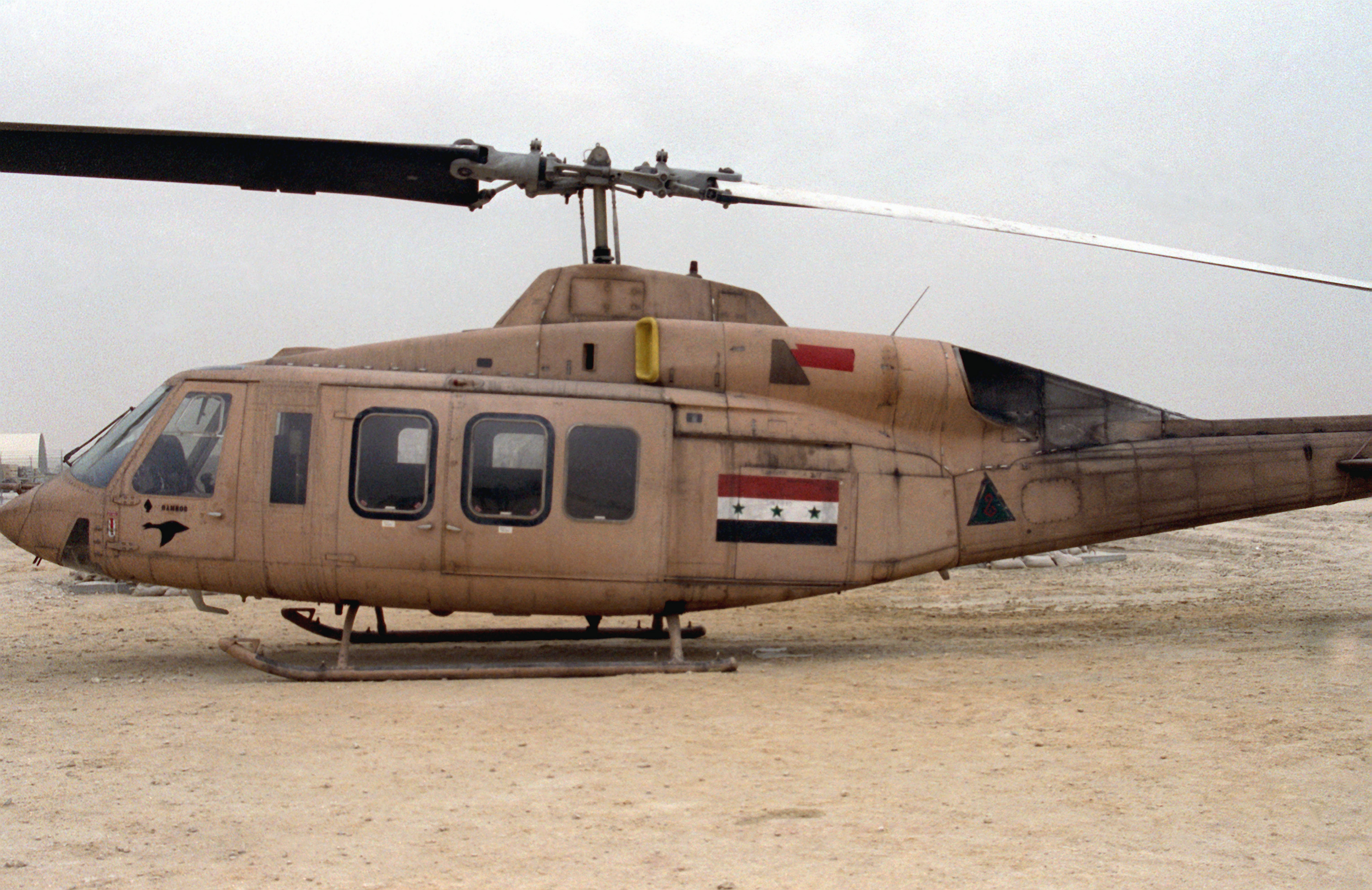
The flag on a Bell 214ST helicopter used during the occupation of Kuwait (captured in Saudi Arabia)

In January 1991, amid the Gulf War and as a prelude to the Faith Campaign, he added the takbīr ("Allahu akbar") between the stars to gain religious support and emphasize Iraq's Islamic identity, moving away from the Ba'ath Party's traditional secular stance. The hamza over the alif of "Allah" in the main variant seems to be a spelling error according to formal Arabic grammar, but it is a common mistake found in many texts. The form of the takbīr was said to be Saddam's own handwriting.

Many interpreted the addition of the sacred Islamic text as an attempt to garner wartime support from previously outlawed religious Iraqi leaders, to stop the disrespect of the Iraqi flag in Iraqi-occupied Kuwait, and to bolster the Iraqi government's Islamist credentials in the period immediately preceding the Gulf War. Despite this, the original 1963 flag without the takbīr remained legal and remained in co-official use until 2004, most commonly as a civil ensign or in places where a less religiously sensitive flag was needed, this contrasts the flag's use after 2012 as a symbol of Sunni Arab ethnic and religious affiliation. The version without the Takbir was never officially used by the American administration.

Following the 2003 invasion of Iraq, the three-star flag was used as a symbol of the Iraqi Insurgency with rebel groups even without direct Sunni identity or ideology such as the Sufi-led Naqshbandi Army and Shia Mahdi Army using versions of the flag as a shared symbol.

=== Iraq War and United States administration ===
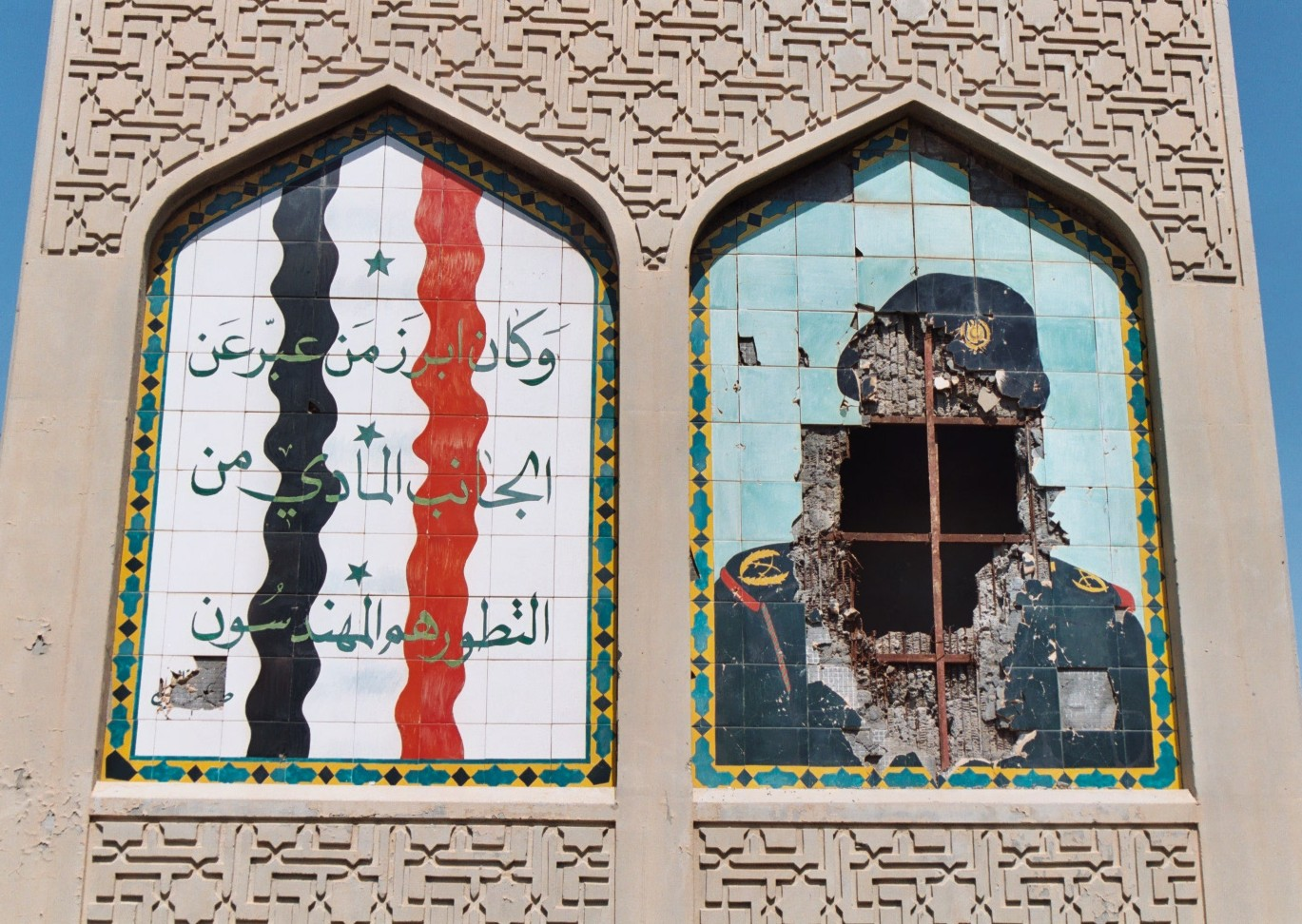
A mural with the flag alongside an image of Saddam Hussein, destroyed by the Coalition forces during the Iraq War (2007)

15 August 2004 – 22 January 2008 variant of the flag of Iraq with stylized Kufic script (ratio: 2:3)

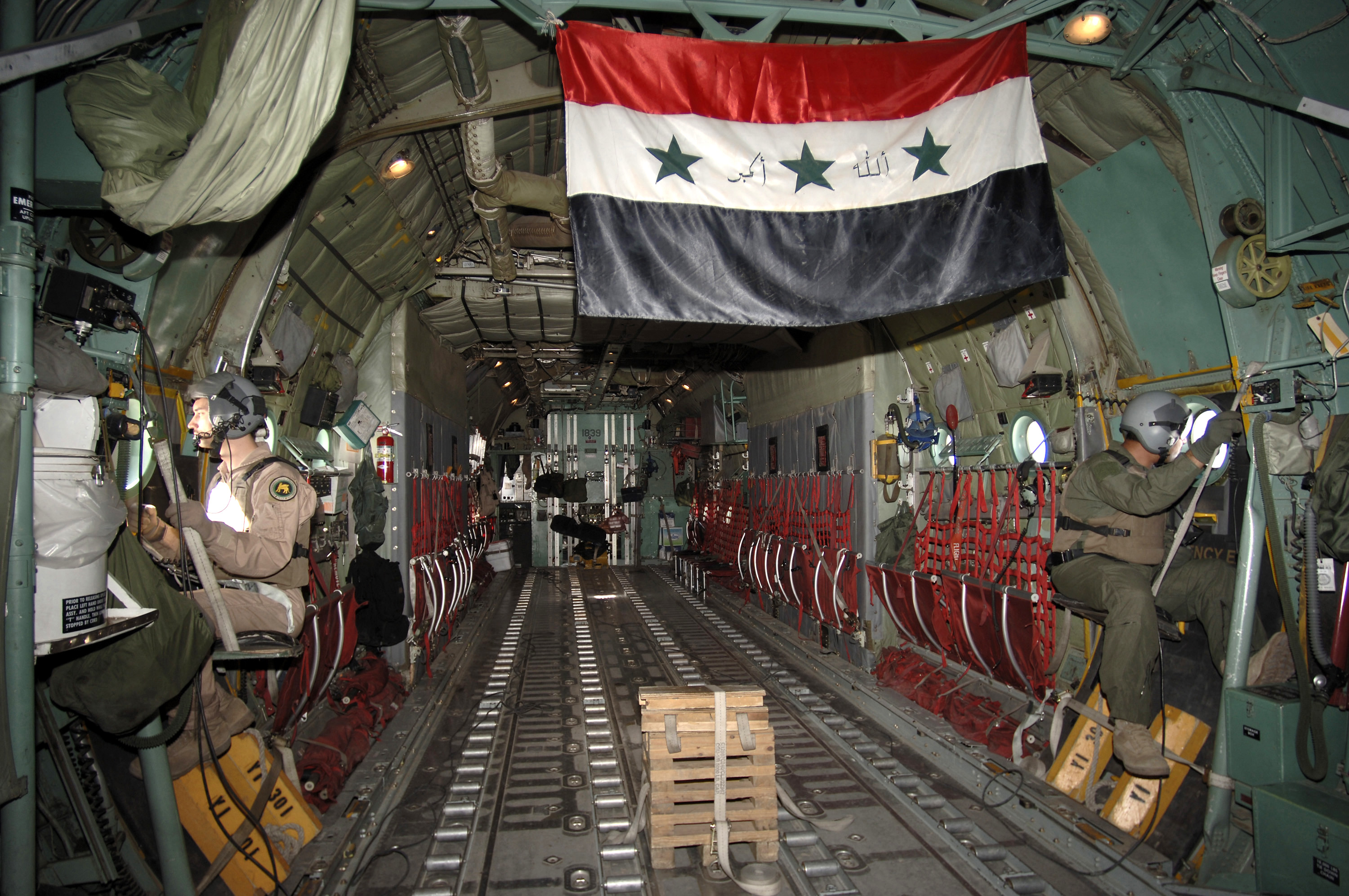
The Pre-Invasion flag being used by U.S. Air Force to represent Iraq after the invasion in 2006

Owing to differing views on a flag proposed by the United States-appointed administration, and the prevailing opposition to an outright abandonment of the current Iraqi flag, a compromise measure was adopted by the U.S.-appointed Iraqi interim administration in 2004. The basic form of the existing flag was retained; however, the takbīr was rendered in traditional stylized Kufic script, as opposed to the handwriting of Saddam Hussein.

The modified flag was unveiled at the ceremony marking the technical "handover" of power from the Coalition Provisional Authority occupation forces to the U.S.-appointed administration on 28 July 2004.

=== Nouri al-Maliki protests and sectarian reemergence ===
Modern version with lighter color shades, used by the Iraqi Sunni Arab protesters since 2012

The 1963 flag reemerged during the 2012–2013 Iraqi protests, adopted by many Sunni Arabs as the distinctive ethnic flag to represent Iraqi Sunni Arabs as a whole against the perceived threat of President Nouri al-Maliki.

The flag's reemergence was intended as reference to a time when Iraq was dominated by Sunni leadership and perceived as more favorable and secure for Sunnis. Its meaning shifted from a former national flag to one associated with Sunni Arab identity and political expression. Shias and other minority groups in Iraq today generally do not identify with the flag, viewing it primarily as a symbol of Sunni Arab identity and Ba'athist political legacy rather than a unifying national emblem, despite originally being an inherently non-sectarian symbol with Nasserist origins.

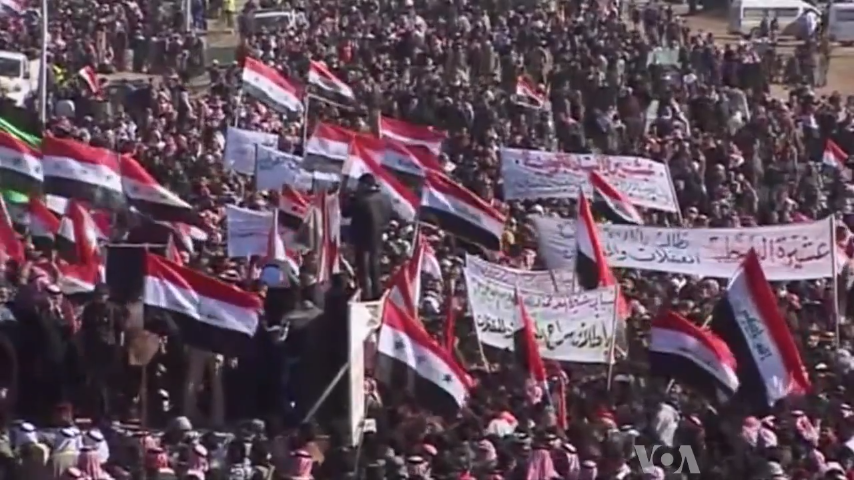
The 1963 and 1991 flags being flown by Iraqi Sunnis, alongside the 2008 flag during the 2012 Iraqi protests

The Shia Muslim-led central government's opposition to federal autonomy is rooted in a deep-seated fear that a decentralized Sunni region would lead to the country's fragmentation. Under the leadership of successive Shia-dominated administrations, the state has viewed these federalist ambitions as a fundamental threat to national sovereignty. To limit the movement, the government has frequently deployed Iraqi Armed Forces to stop protests and arrest activists, often under the pretense of maintaining public order. This physical crackdown is in response due to claims that the movement is a cover for Islamic State or Ba'athist (or Naqshabandi Army) revivalism. In line with this, the state has strictly banned the three-star flag and other symbols associated with the former Sunni-led regime, portraying their use as a subversive act.

== Illegality ==
Although the 2004 version of the Iraqi flag was introduced as a transitional design intended to reduce overt associations with Saddam Hussein's regime, the current Government of Iraq continues to regard all iterations of the three star flag featuring the takbir between the stars as symbols linked to Ba'athist rule. In March 2025, police in Baghdad arrested a resident of the Sumer district after he raised the 2004 flag over his home, reportedly citing it as an expression of allegiance to the former regime.

The legal status of the flag today is strongly tied to its use by Sunni sectarian and Ba'athist anti-government groups and because of this, usage or flying of the flag in Iraq today is strongly restricted by government organizations and Hashd Al Shaabi even if flown by civilians or used in a historical context.

== Gallery ==
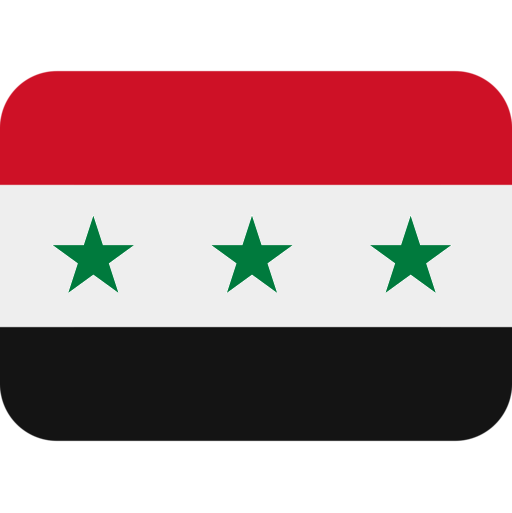
A modern Twemoji representation of the flag

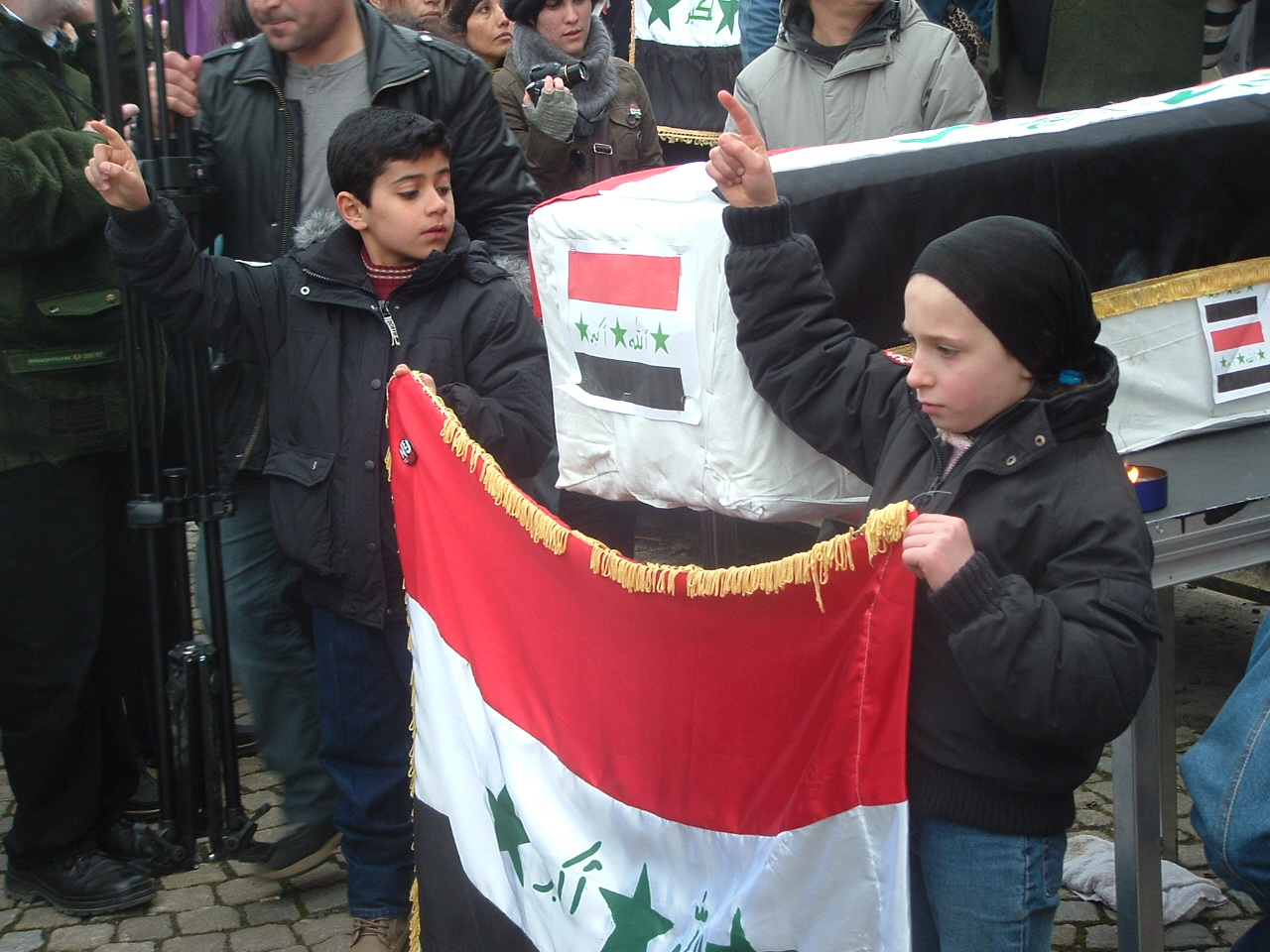
The flag seen at an Iraqi solidarity event in Sweden

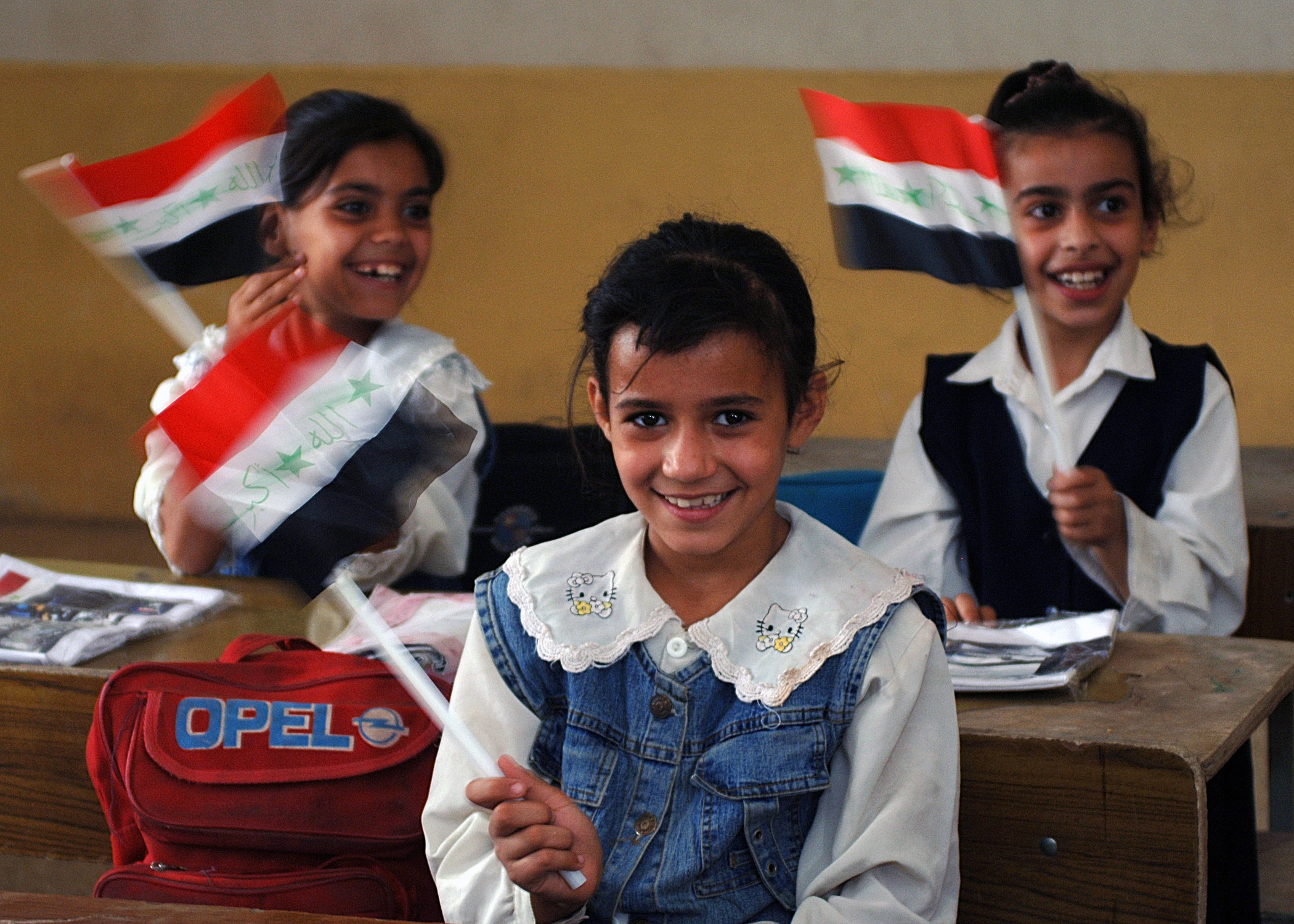
The flag being waved by schoolchildren

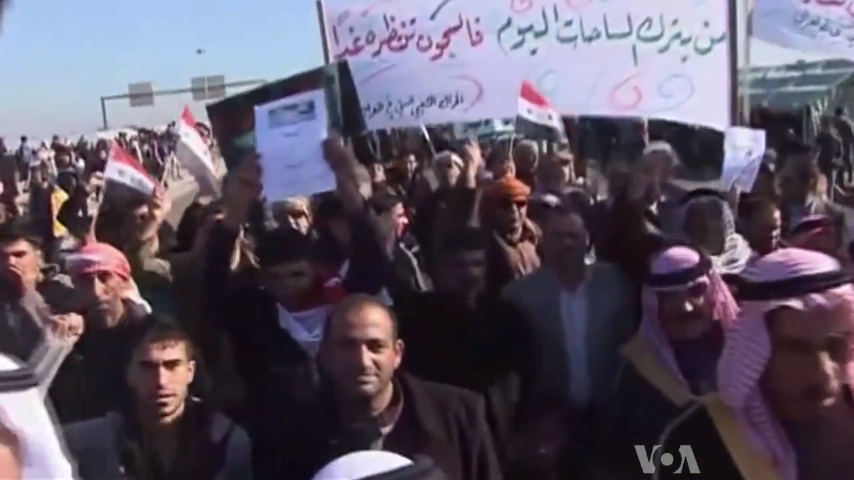
Flag seen during an Iraqi Sunni protest in 2013

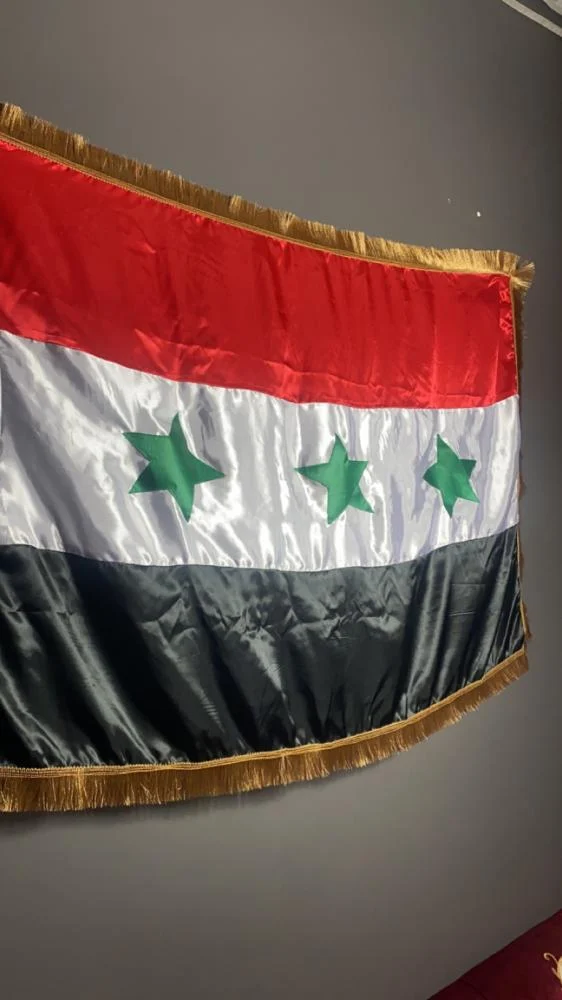
Modern version of the flag seen in a Sunni majlis

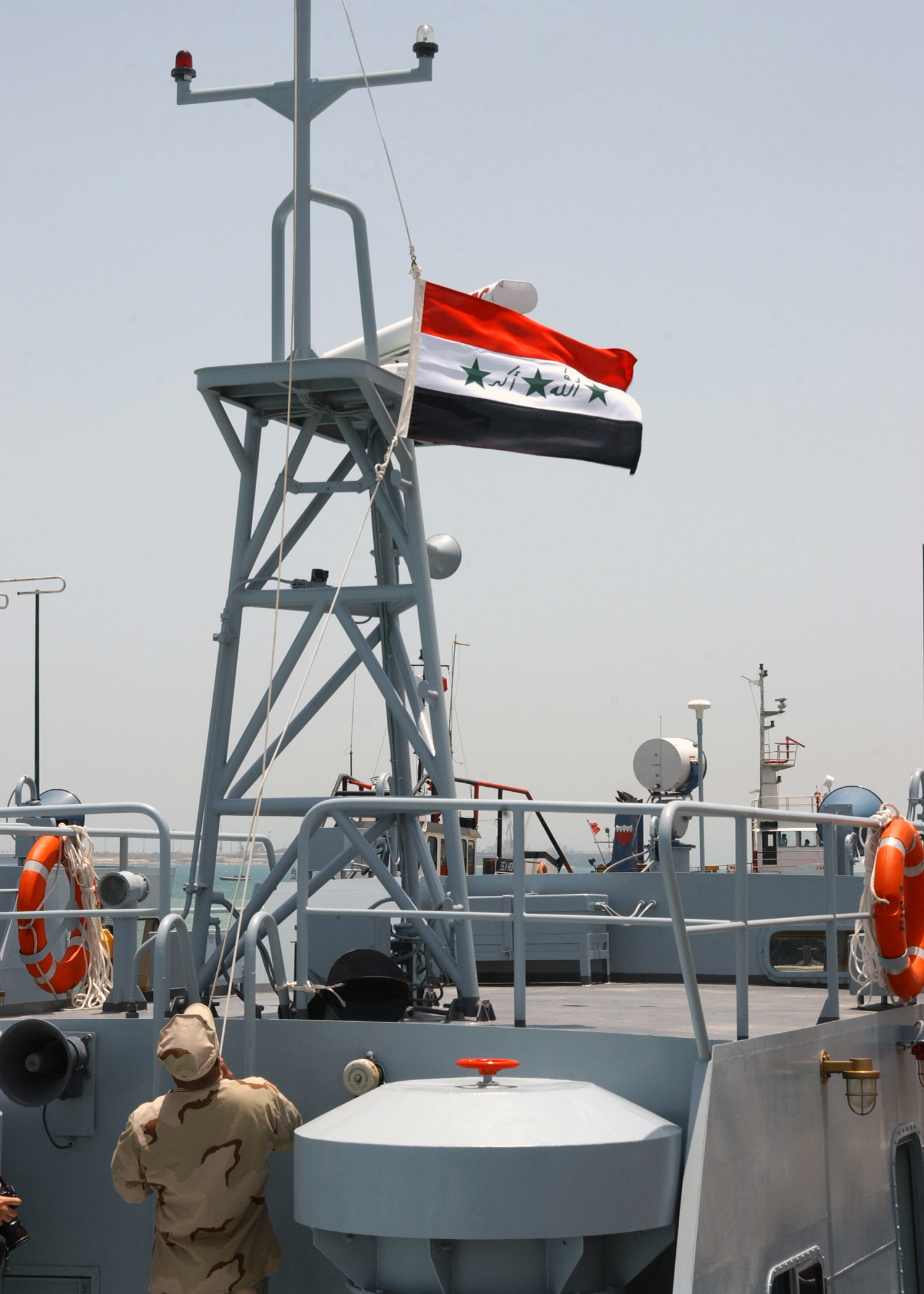
The flag being waved aboard a US Navy ship in Hawaii

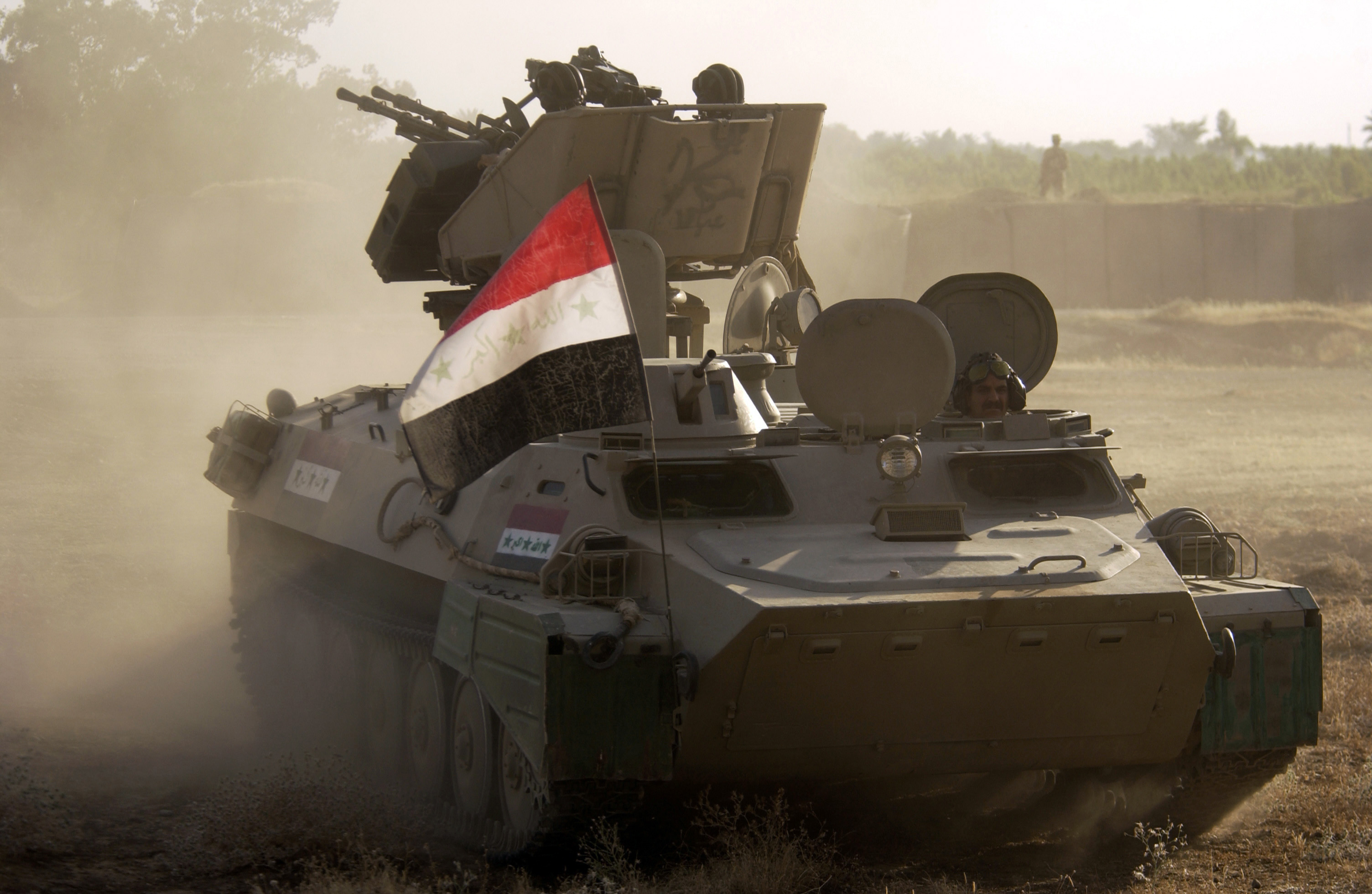
Flag seen on an Iraqi tank

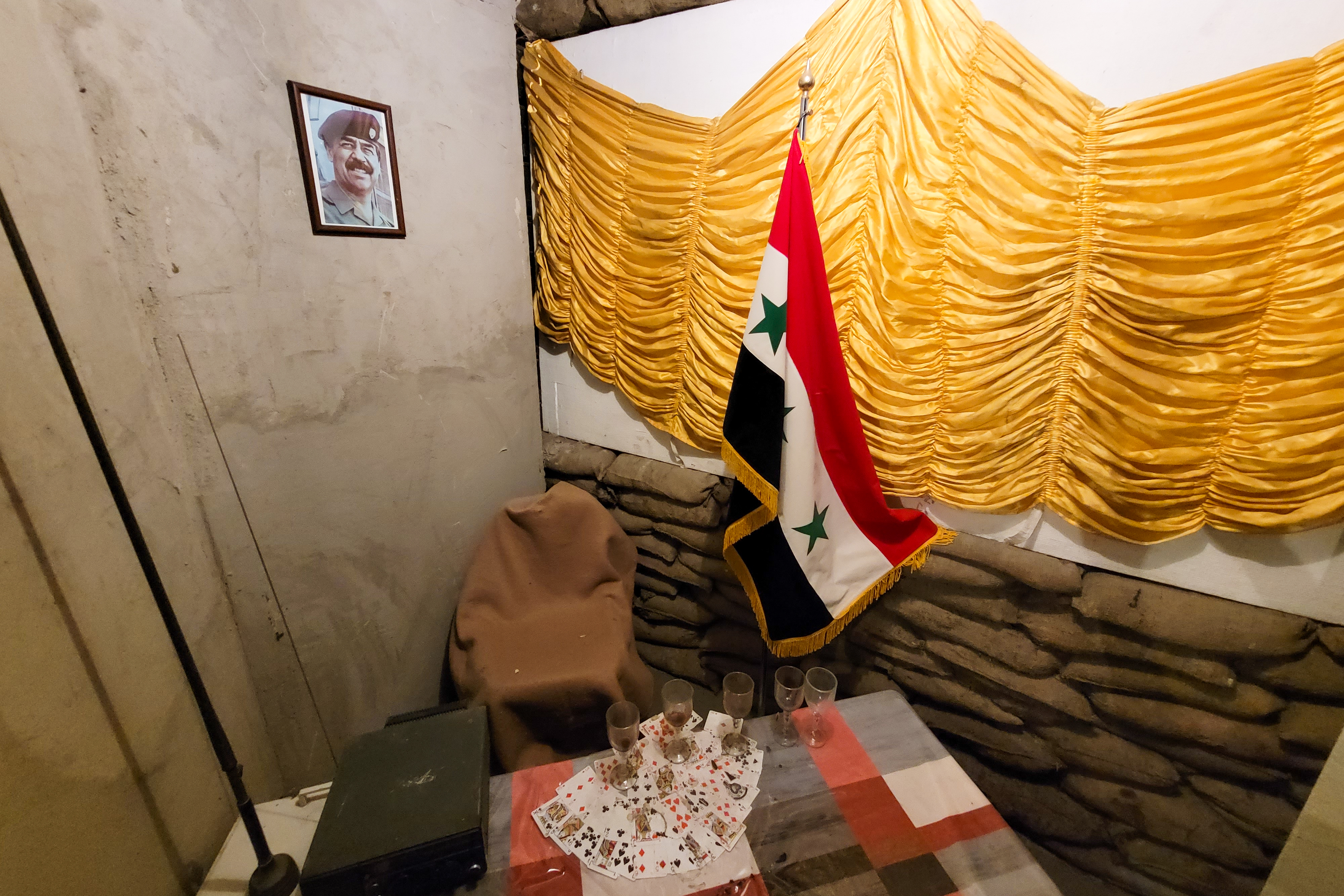
The flag seen at a reconstruction of an Iraqi command center at a museum in Tehran, Iran

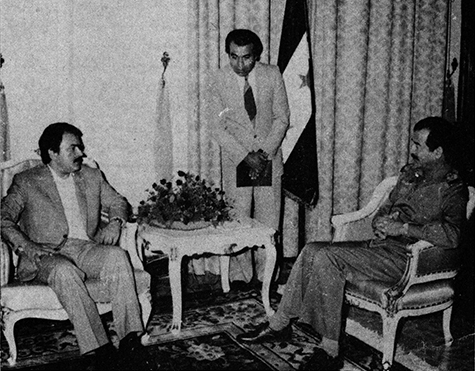
The flag during a meeting between Massoud Rajavi and Saddam Hussein

== See also ==
- Flag of Iraq
- Arab Liberation Flag
- Pan-Arab colors
