= Sunni Region =

Sunni Region الإقليم السني (Arabic)
- Proposed federal region
- Flag used by the Iraqi Sunni Arabs

- Map of the location of the proposed region, alongside the jurisdiction of the Kurdistan Region
- Country: Iraq
- Capital: Ramadi (proposed)
- Common languages: North Mesopotamian Arabic; Gilit Mesopotamian Arabic
- Ethnic groups: Iraqi Sunni Arabs
- Religion: Sunni Islam

The Sunni Region (Arabic: الإقليم السني), also called the Arab-majority Sunni Region, or in secular usage as West Iraq (Arabic: غرب العراق), is a proposed autonomous federal region of Iraq that would encompass all Arab Sunni-majority governorates of the country. The purpose of which is to allow the Sunni Arab population mainly located in the west of Iraq to exercise a degree of local self-rule, akin to the Kurdistan Region.

Also proposed is the Anbar Region (Arabic: إقليم الأنبار), a proposed federal region that encompasses solely the Anbar Governorate. A common proposal for the capital city of a Sunni region is Ramadi, the current capital of the afformentioned Governorate.

Neither the proposal to establish a Sunni federal region nor the idea of a separate Anbar region has gained universal support among Iraq's Sunni Arab community. Critics argue that such initiatives could be seen as a step toward sectarian division, tribal rule, and a form of partition of the country, potentially undermining Iraq’s national unity and straining relations with the Shia-led federal government.

Federal initiatives among Iraqi Sunni Arabs, particularly in the Saladin Governorate and the city of Tikrit, have been met with suspicion from the Shia Muslim ruling elite who viewed the proposals as establishing potential safe havens for former members of the Iraqi Ba'ath Party. This view was endorsed by former prime minister Nouri al-Maliki.

== History ==
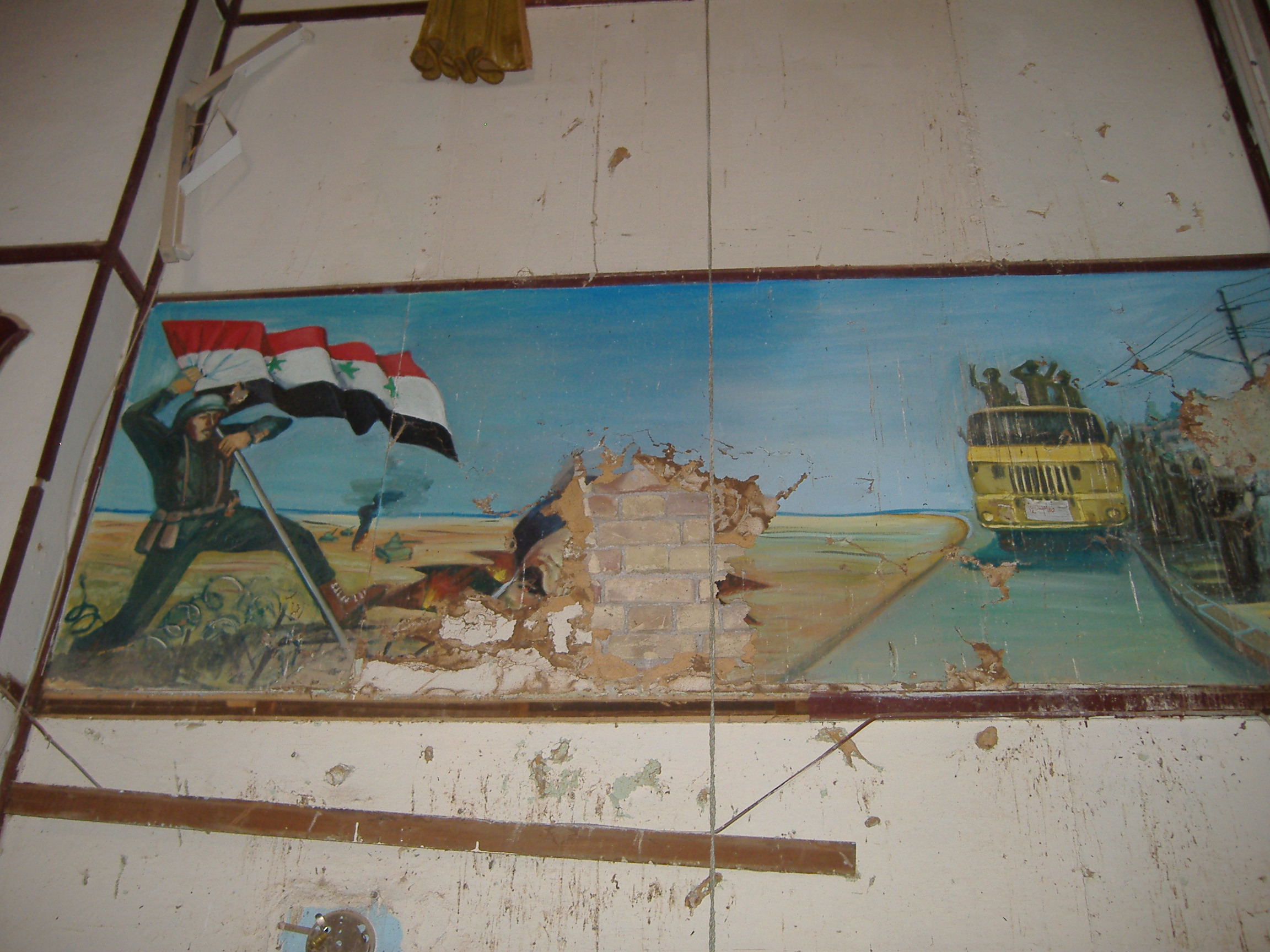
Before 2003, Iraqi Sunni Arabs dominated the state and many strongly identified with a secular Arab identity closely tied to the state and Ba'athist ideology, rather than religious sect.

Before 2003, Iraq's Sunni-majority regions were politically dominant under the Arab Socialist Union and later Ba'ath Party under Saddam Hussein, and many urban Sunnis were relatively wealthy and secular, identifying primarily as culturally "Arabs" or "Iraqi Arabs" in a pan-Arab, Iraqi nationalist or Nasserist sense rather than along sectarian lines. Formal proposals for Sunni autonomy were largely absent, as Sunni Arabs controlled much of the country's political, military, and economic structures and had little incentive for regional self-rule. The closest model of federal autonomy in Iraq was the 1970 Iraqi–Kurdish Autonomy Agreement, which applied only to the Kurdish north.

During the invasion and subsequent occupation, some American commentators and policymakers, including Antony Blinken, discussed proposals for a Sunni autonomous region or, in more expansive forms, an independent "Sunnistan" in Western Iraq as a means of managing post-2003 sectarian conflict following the shift of power away from Sunni elites toward Shia-led institutions. These proposals did not gain traction within Iraq but reflected wider debates about the erosion of Iraq's previously dominant secular political framework after the occupation.

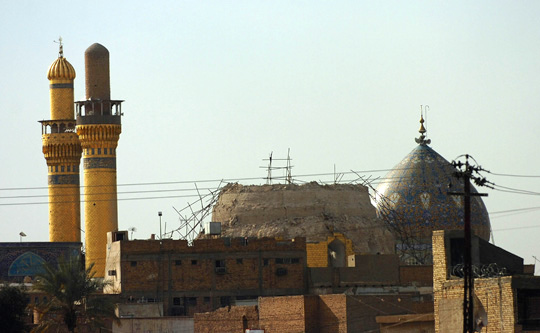
Photograph of Al-Askari Shrine after the first bombing in February 2006.

After the American-led invasion of Iraq in 2003, the new Iraqi government was federalized. Article 1 of the 2005 Iraqi Constitution institutionalized a federal structure of Iraq, which Sunni Arabs initially rejected. Nevertheless, it was approved, and Iraq became a federal republic, with the Kurdistan Region being constitutionally recognized.

The rise of sectarian violence, especially after the 2006 al-Askari shrine bombing, and increasing marginalization of Sunni areas by the Shia-led government prompted a gradual re-evaluation of federalism among Sunni elites. The proposal included regions such as Anbar, Diyala, Saladin, Nineveh, Kirkuk and the outskirts of Baghdad. Despite similar marginalization, tensions persisted between Arabs and Turkmen over certain regions in Nineveh, Kirkuk, Diyala, and Salah al-Din governorates.

Between 2006 and 2008, U.S.-backed Sunni tribal militias, known as the Sahwa (Awakening) Councils, helped drive out al-Qaeda from Anbar. This brief period of local empowerment fueled calls for greater provincial control over security and governance, especially after Baghdad failed to integrate Sahwa fighters into national security institutions.

By 2011, provincial councils in Anbar, Salah al-Din, and Nineveh began calling for application of Article 119 of the constitution, which allows for the creation of new federal regions. These calls were framed as responses to sectarian discrimination, arbitrary arrests, and economic neglect by Baghdad. Sunni leader Thaer Al-Bayati stated that the proposal for autonomy has widespread backing among Sunni Iraqis. After the defeat of the Islamic State in 2017, there was a significant increase in Sunni Arab demands for autonomy in the western side of Iraq.

== Federal government opposition and killings ==
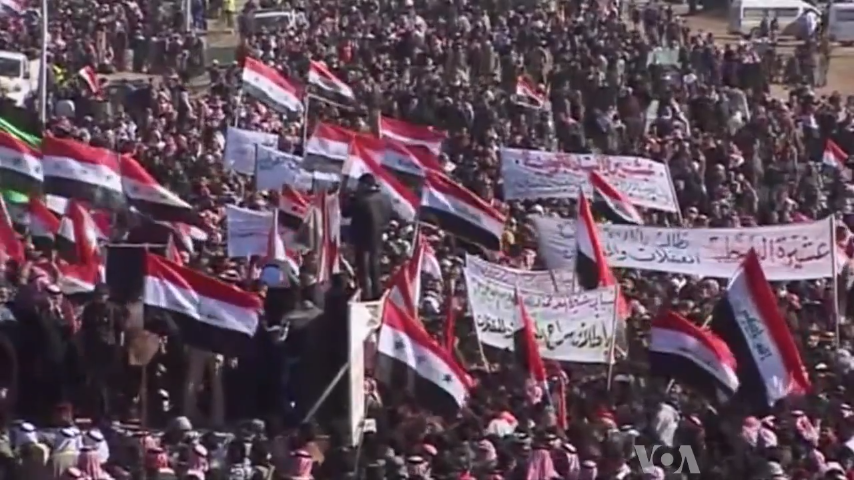
Sunni demonstrators protesting against the Maliki government (Dec. 2012–Jan. 2013)

The Shia Muslim-led central government's opposition to federal autonomy is rooted in a deep-seated fear that a decentralized Sunni region would lead to the country's fragmentation. Under the leadership of successive Shia-dominated administrations, the state has viewed these federalist ambitions as a fundamental threat to national sovereignty. To limit the movement, the government has frequently deployed Iraqi Armed Forces to stop protests and arrest activists, often under the pretense of maintaining public order. This physical crackdown is in response due to claims that the movement is a cover for Islamic State or Ba'athist (or Naqshabandi Army) revivalism. In line with this, the state has strictly banned the three-star flag and other symbols associated with the former Sunni-led regime, portraying their use as a subversive act.

The state's use of the judiciary as a tool of political suppression is most evident in the cases of high-ranking Sunni officials who were targeted under Article 4 of the Anti-Terrorism Law.

In 2011, Vice President Tariq al-Hashemi was accused of operating death squads, a charge he denied as politically motivated; he eventually fled to Turkey after being sentenced to death in absentia. Similarly, Finance Minister Rafi al-Issawi saw his staff and bodyguards arrested in a series of raids in 2012, an event that became a major catalyst for the Sunni protest movement across the west of Iraq. By 2013, the crackdown intensified with the violent arrest of Member of Parliament Ahmed al-Alwani in Ramadi. Al-Alwani, an outspoken supporter of the autonomy protests, was sentenced to death in 2014 following a trial that international observers criticized for a lack of due process. These cases served as a clear signal from Baghdad that advocating for a sunni-based entity would be treated as an act of terrorism rather than a legitimate political debate.

== Conflict with Assyrian Christian autonomy ==
Map showcasing disputed regions in Nineveh Plains

While Sunni federalist groups advocate for a federal region to shield and protect their interests from central government overreach, Assyrians and other Christian groups fear that such an arrangement would effectively swallow their ancestral lands (and the Assyrian-majority city of Qaraqosh), leaving them as a vulnerable minority within a larger sectarian government arrangement. Although the Nineveh Governorate has a large Christian minority, it still has a Sunni Arab majority and is considered a crucial part of the Iraqi Sunni Arab homeland. Regions of Nineveh are also claimed by Kurdistan and Turkmeneli regional movements.

This tension reached a critical point in 2016, when the Iraqi Parliament voted against the creation of a new, Christian-led province in the Nineveh Plains. This legislative move directly blocked a primary political objective shared by all major Assyrian institutions and political groups. In the wake of the decision, Assyrian leaders, including Romeo Hakkari, head of the Bet-Nahrain Democratic Party, staged protests to voice their opposition. They explicitly stated their refusal to be incorporated into the proposed Sunni region, viewing the Sunni autonomist project as a threat to their specific goals for self-determination and security.

== Tikrit Region and Iranian Involvement ==
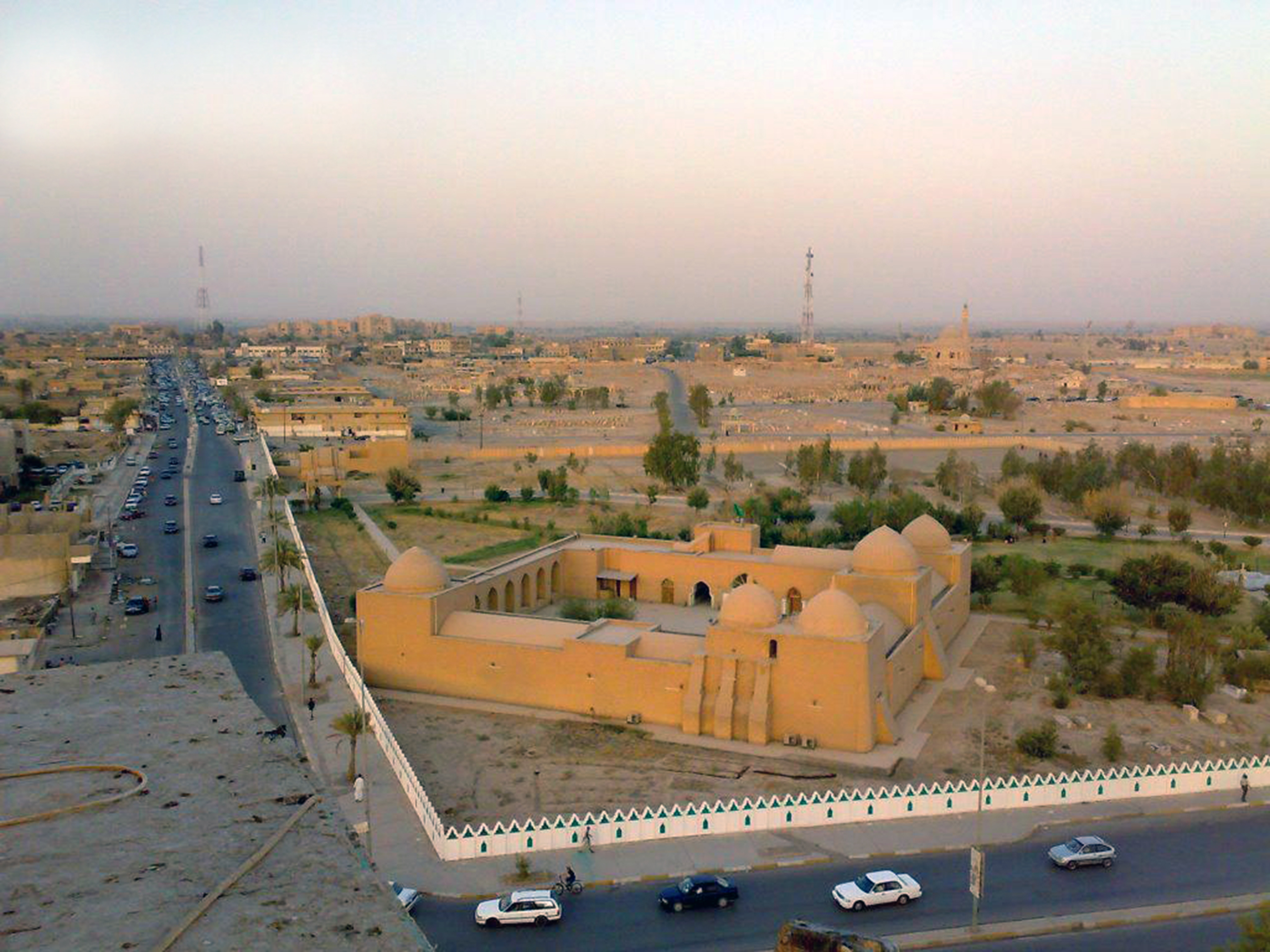
The city of Tikrit (pictured), attempted to form its own Sunni Arab autonomy prior to its capture by the Islamic State in 2015.

In 2011, the Provincial Council of Saladin Governorate attempted to establish an autonomous Tikrit federal region by invoking Article 119 of the Iraqi Constitution. This proposal, which sought to create a standalone Sunni Arab entity separate from broader initiatives in Anbar or Nineveh, was immediately blocked by the central government. Prime Minister Nouri al-Maliki denounced the move as a sectarian plot and a "Ba'athist project," alleging it was designed to transform the province into a safe haven for former regime members.

Following the Second Battle of Tikrit and the city's recapture from the Islamic State in 2015, this vision for local self-rule was effectively dismantled as Iranian military advisors and the Popular Mobilization Forces (PMF) moved into a permanent occupation of Tikrit. Factions like Asa'ib Ahl al-Haq and Kata'ib Hezbollah established a dominant security and economic presence, seizing government buildings and neighborhoods for use as fortified bases. This military occupation, fueled by deep-seated suspicion of the city's Pan-Arabist past, ensures the area remains firmly under the control of the federal government and its Iranian patrons, effectively ending local momentum for Sunni self-governance in Tikrit and the surrounding region.

== Arab Gulf Involvement ==
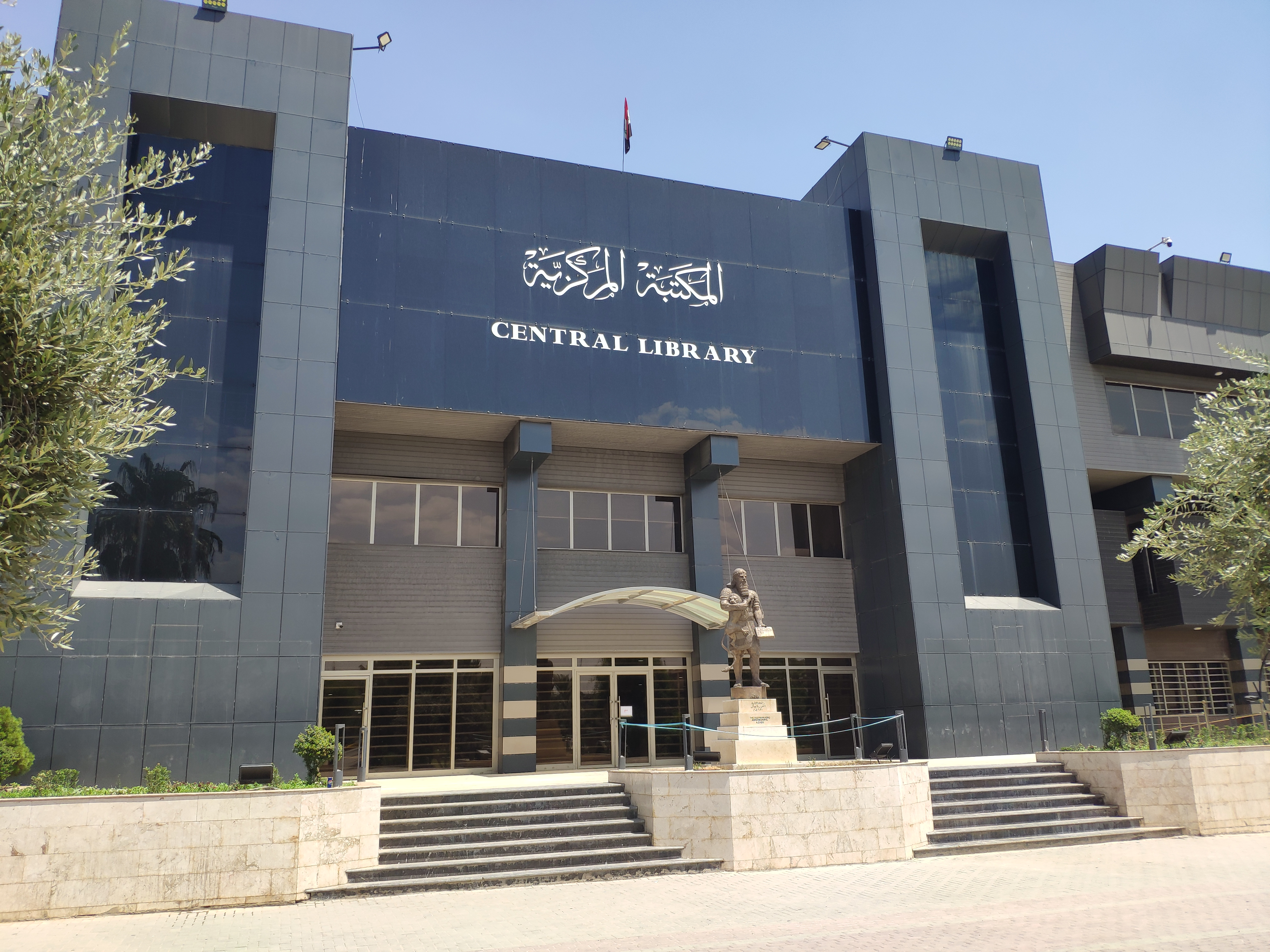
Saudi businesses have been heavily involved in reconstruction in Iraq's Sunni-majority regions, including investments in universities and libraries. Critics argue this may encourage Western Iraq to align more closely with the Arab Gulf.

Shia-aligned actors in Iraq's federal government have criticized Gulf-led engagement around western Iraq as an attempt to institutionalize a theoretical autonomous Sunni region to be more closely aligned with the United Arab Emirates, Saudi Arabia and the Gulf Cooperation Council than with Baghdad. Supporters of the region emphasize Western Iraq's distinct identity, noting that the majority of Iraqi Sunni tribes have historical roots and familial ties in Saudi Arabia and Kuwait, as well as broader Bedouin and cultural connections across the Arab Gulf. From this perspective, stronger engagement with Gulf partners reflects local self-identification and historical affinities rather than external interference, highlighting a contrast with the Iranian-influenced central government.

Saudi Arabia and other Gulf states have invested in western Iraq through infrastructure and development projects, including electricity networks, roads, and other joint initiatives. Proponents frame these investments as supporting communities with shared tribal, cultural, and historical links, providing resources and economic engagement in a role similar to Iran's in predominantly Shia regions. While critics portray these initiatives as attempts to expand Gulf influence, they also reflect the region's longstanding social, economic, and cultural connections with the Arab Gulf.

== Reception ==
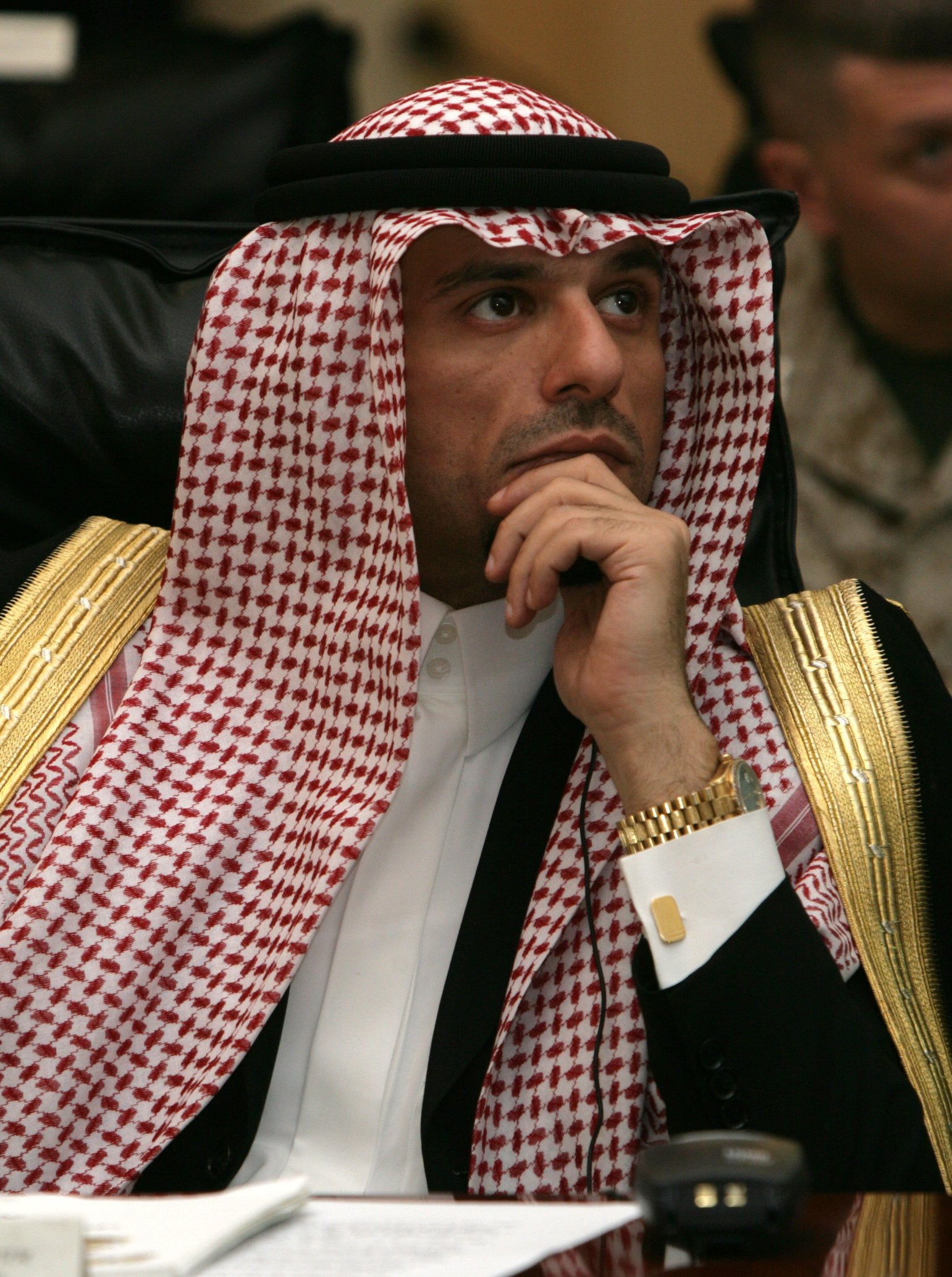
Portrait of Ali Hatem al-Suleiman.

In 2024, Abdul-Hamid al-Hassan, an influential senior member of Dulaym, categorically rejected any calls to create new federal regions in the country and called on all Sunni Arab tribes of Iraq to "renounce anyone who attends conferences that aim to divide the country into disintegrated states that are subject to external interference". On the other hand, Raad Sulayman, another senior member of Dulaym, and an ardent supporter of the proposal has claimed that 90% of Iraq’s Arab Sunni population support the idea and that there is international support in this regard as well.

Mohamed Al-Halbousi, the leader of Takadum, the largest Sunni Arab party in Iraq, rejected Raad’s comments saying: "Sheikh. Your work is not acceptable and creates sedition and causes us to end up in unnecessary mazes, and furthermore, we do not know who is behind your recent statements". Ali Hatem al-Suleiman, the Sheikh of Dulaym in Iraq, likewise rejected the comments made by Raad stating: "no one thinks that Anbar should become a [federal] region at this time", emphasising that "whoever speaks about this regard represents himself [only]".

== See also ==
- Sectarian violence against Sunni Arabs in Iraq
- Violence against Palestinians in the Iraq War
- Federal regions of Iraq
  - Proposed federal regions
- Kurdistan Region
- Federalism in Iraq
- Politics of Iraq
- Federal government of Iraq
