= Sunni Islam in Iraq =

Major religious minority in Iraq

Iraqi Sunnis
سنة العراق
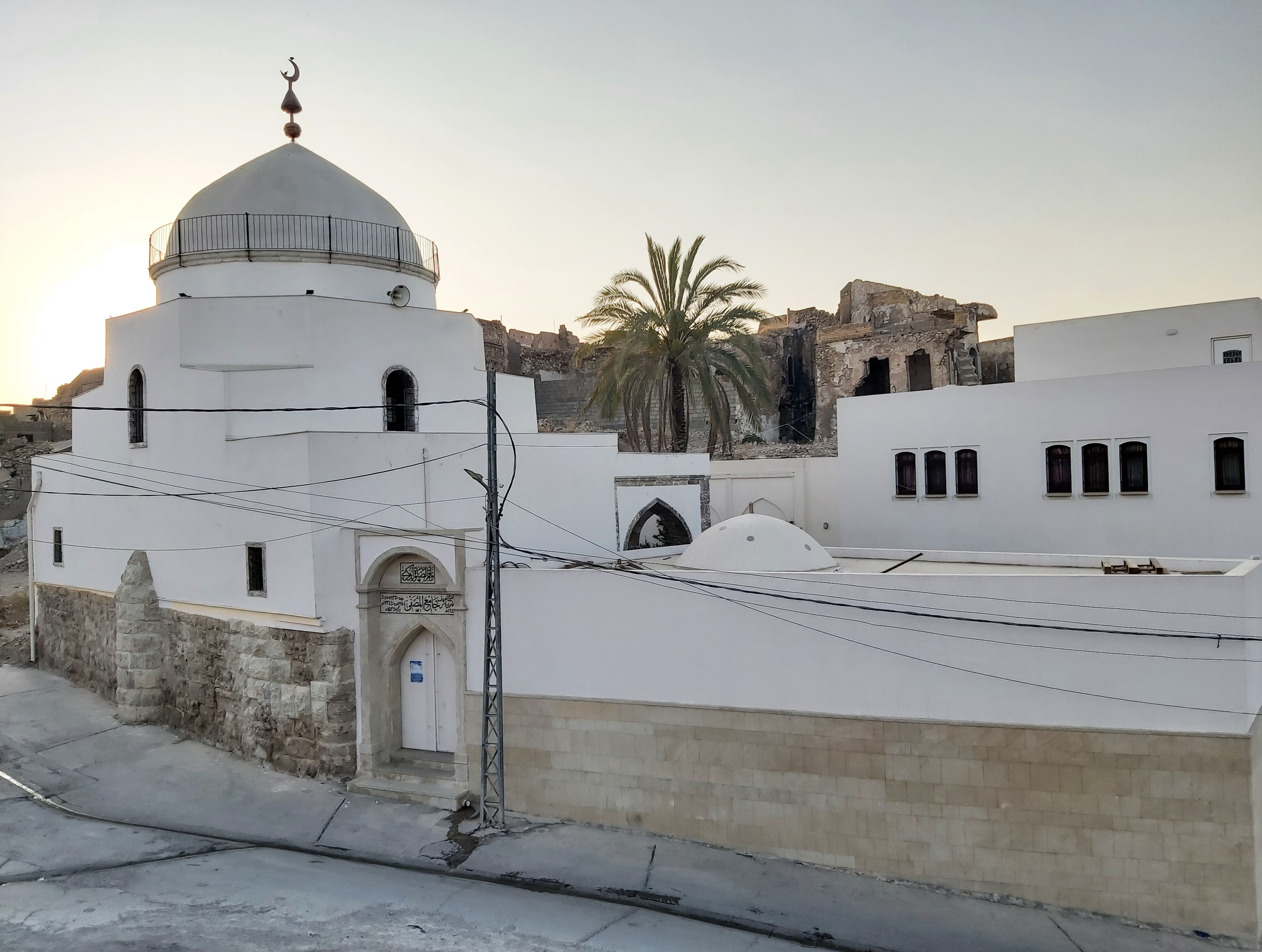
- Umayyad Mosque of Mosul, located in the place of the mosque built in 637 during the early Arab conquests

Total population
- Total number unknown, historically comprised a demographic majority in the regions of West Iraq and Iraqi Kurdistan with a notable Sunni minorities residing in Basra and Baghdad

Regions with significant populations
- West Iraq and Iraqi Kurdistan

Languages
- Mesopotamian Arabic (majority, lingua franca); North Mesopotamian Arabic, Kurdish, Turkmen

Religion
- Sunni Islam (Hanafi, Shafi'i, Salafi)

Related ethnic groups
- other Sunni Muslims

Sunni Islam in Iraq (Arabic: الإسلام السني في العراق) is the second-largest sect of Islam in Iraq after Shia Islam. The majority of Iraqi Sunni Muslims are Arabs with the second largest being Kurds. Iraqi Sunni Arabs are mostly situated in the western and northern regions bordering Kurdistan. Sunni Arabs primarily inhabit the Sunni Triangle, Upper Mesopotamia and the desert areas, such as Al-Anbar Governorate in the Arabian Desert and Syrian Desert. The Sunni Kurds inhabit the mountainous Iraqi Kurdistan region.

In 2003, the United States-based Institute of Peace estimated that around 95% of the total population of Iraq were Muslim, of which Sunnis made up around 40%. A CIA World Factbook report from 2015 estimates that 29–34% of the population of Iraq is Sunni Muslim. According to a 2011 survey by Pew Research, 42% of Iraqi Muslims are Sunni. There were about 9 million Sunni Arabs, 4 million Sunni Kurds and approximately 1.5 million Sunni Turkmens in Iraq (approximately 39%), according to a report published in 2015.

== Iraqi Sunni Arabs ==
Iraqi Sunni Arabs
العرب السنة العراقيين
- The Flag of Iraqi Sunni Arabs, originally used during Sunni Arab political hegemony is now used as an ethnic and protest flag for the group.

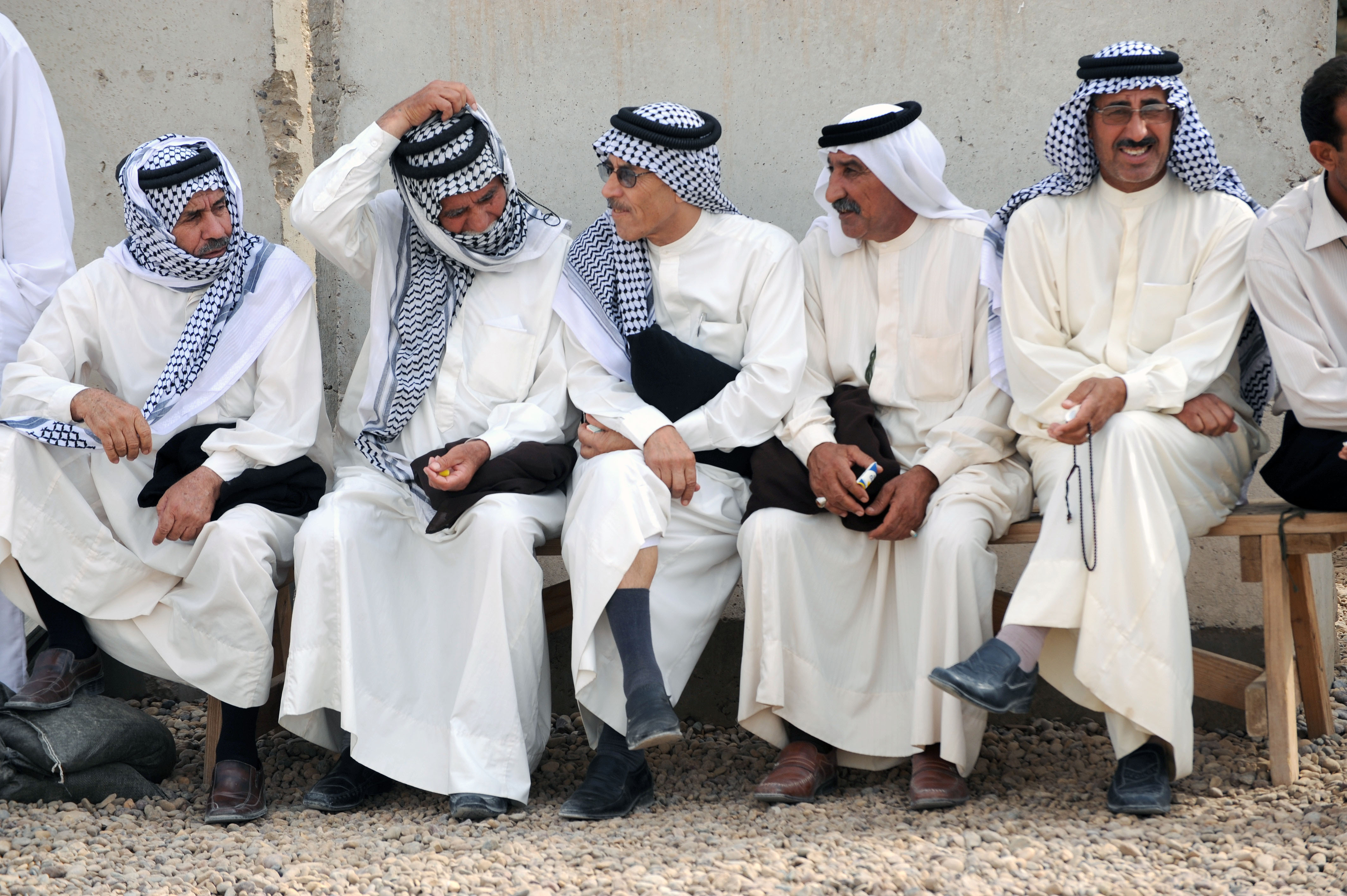
- Sunni Arab tribal chiefs representing the Sahwa after meeting with Iraqi security at Joint Security Station Loyalty, eastern Baghdad, May 16, 2009.

Regions with significant populations
- Iraq (primarily Sunni Triangle, Upper Mesopotamia and Syrian Desert); Around 9 million; 24% (2015 estimate)
- Jordan: 306,000–340,000

Languages
- Mesopotamian Arabic, Bedouin Arabic

Religion
- Sunni Islam

Related ethnic groups
- Syrians, Jordanians, Saudis

Iraqi Sunni Arabs (Arabic: العرب السنة العراقيين), historically referred to as the Arabs of Al-Jazira (Arabic: عرب الجزيرة), are an Iraqi Arab ethnoreligious group. Iraqi Sunni Arabs mainly inhabit the provinces of Al-Anbar, Salah al-Din, Nineveh, Kirkuk, Diyala, and areas of Baghdad with Sunni Bedouin inhabiting the desert regions of the south, the border with Kuwait and the Jordanian steppe. In the modern era, Iraqi Sunni Arabs are often mistaken by outsiders as simply Iraqi Arabs who follow Sunni Islam rather than Shia but constitute a distinct Arab people with a unique history and origin tied to the region of West Iraq they primarily inhabit.

Iraqi Sunni Arabs have traditionally been organized into large, indigenous tribal confederations, including Dulaim of Al-Anbar, al-Bu Nasir of Tikrit, al-Bu Nimr of Ramadi, and al-Ubaid of northern Salah al-Din and Kirkuk. These tribes have long functioned as key social, political, and economic structures within Sunni society.

In addition, several Bedouin tribes of Najdi and northern Arabian origin, notably the Shammar, Mutayr, Otaibah, and Banu Tamim, historically ranged across the western steppe and southern desert fringes of the Ottoman Empire's Baghdad Vilayet, covering what is now central and southwestern Iraq. Over the course of the 20th century, many members of these tribes integrated into mainstream Jazira-influenced Sunni Iraqi society, gradually transitioning from semi-nomadic livelihoods to urban residence in major centers such as Baghdad, Mosul, and Ramadi, in line with Iraq's broader processes of modernization, sedentarization, and urban expansion.

=== History ===
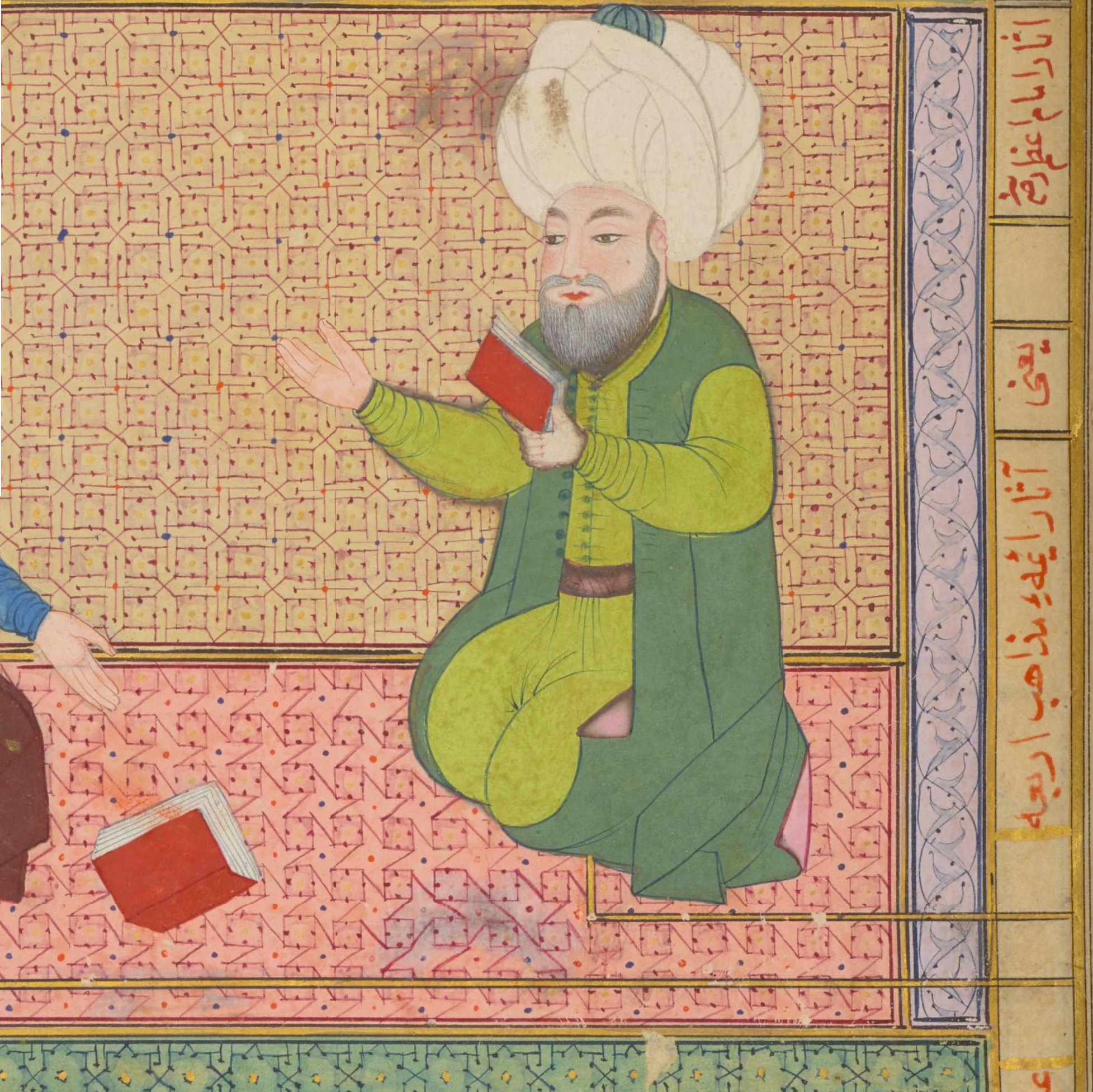
16th-century Ottoman miniature depicting Abu Hanifa, a scholar of Iraqi Sunni Arab descent, born in Kufa and founder of the Hanafi school of Sunni jurisprudence. His legal tradition remains one of the most widely followed within Sunni Islam worldwide.

Iraqi Sunni Arabs largely originated as a mixture of Arab Muslims who settled in Iraq after the Islamic conquest of the Sasanian Empire, as well as natives who were Arabized. In the early Islamic period, Iraq was a key center of the Abbasid Caliphate, with the city of Baghdad serving as its capital from the 8th to the 13th century. Sunni Arabs played a significant role in the administration (including the ruling Abbasid dynasty) and cultural life of the caliphate, and many important figures of Islamic scholarship and literature emerged from Iraq during this time and during the Islamic Golden Age. Before the creation of nation states, Iraqi Sunni Arabs identified with the wider neighboring Sunni Arab populations. After the dissolution of the Ottoman Empire, King Faisal I was installed as ruler of Iraq. Iraqi Sunni Arab identity consolidated after the independence of Iraq, where Iraqi Sunni Arabs inhabited the provinces of Al-Anbar, Salah al-Din, Nineveh, Kirkuk, Diyala, and parts of Baghdad.

Sectarian identities in Iraq were deeply tied to regional and tribal affiliation, with Sunnis and Shias historically inhabiting segregated regions —with a degree of overlap and coexistence— each with their own historical narrative. The regions inhabited by Iraqi Sunni Arabs were the historic regions of Al-Jazira and Upper Mesopotamia while the Shia stronghold has historically been southern Iraq, known as Babylonia or Sawad (the latter of which is also called Lower Mesopotamia), which, while remaining strongly Arab, has had more Persianate influence compared to Sunni areas (most recently contributed by the rule of the Safavid dynasty). Sunni identity in Al-Jazira and West Iraq strongly reflects Bedouin heritage and Arabian tribal traditions, following the Arab conquest of Mesopotamia and newer minor Ottoman-era connections to Levantine, Eastern European and Balkan cultures, contributing to a cultural background with different influences to that of the Shia-majority regions of the south but strongly rooted in the culture of Arabian Peninsula rather than the Mediterranean or Iran.

=== Culture ===
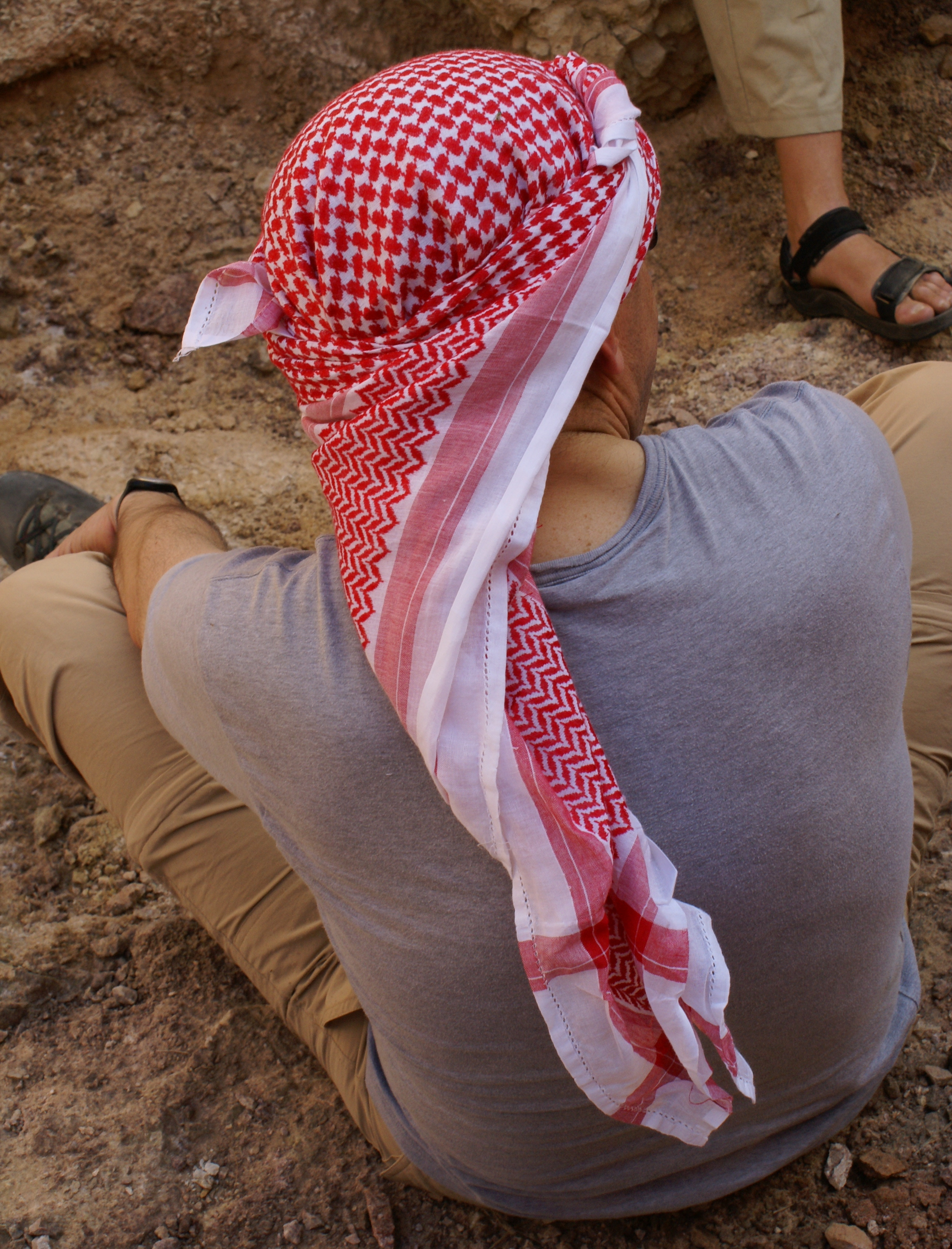
Sunni Arabs north of Tikrit commonly wear the red and white keffiyeh (šamāġ aḥmar), reflecting broader Levantine Arab traditions. In contrast, Arabs from regions south of Tikrit tend to wear the black and white keffiyeh (kūfiyya sōda w bēḍa), which is more commonly associated with Shia identity.

Sunni Iraqi Arab culture, particularly in cities such as Tikrit, Fallujah, Samarra, and Mosul, is characterized by a combination of tribal traditions and conservative Sunni Islamic practices. Common clothing includes the white dishdasha and red-and-white keffiyeh with a black agal, shared with other Arab groups. Regional food traditions vary, Mosul is known for Ottoman-influenced dishes such as baked sambusak with spiced lamb, dolma prepared with pomegranate molasses, and ćevapi (known locally as kebab hindi), a grilled minced meat dish of Balkan origin uncommon in other parts of Iraq. In Samarra, cuisine reflects Bedouin and tribal influences, including pacha with stuffed intestines and tripe, fried sambusak with heavier spices, and dishes like tashreeb (Bread Stew) and timman bil-tamatim (Spiced Tomato Rice) served during communal gatherings. Arabian dishes such as Mandi and Haneeth remain popular special occasion and gathering meals in more Bedouin-descendent desert regions such as Anbar and Saladin, spreading through tribes such as the Banu Tamim and the Mutayr and modern influence from the culture of Eastern Arabia among Sunni Arabs.

Diwaniyas in Sunni regions function as formal male-only spaces used for hospitality, dispute resolution, and tribal or religious consultation. Unlike the Shia majlis, Sunni diwaniyas tend to avoid sectarian symbolism and focus on tribal hierarchy and Sunni jurisprudence. Traditional games such as Tavli (backgammon), dominoes, and carrom are commonly played. Music is generally conservative, with limited instrumental use, though Iraqi maqam remains culturally significant. Religious life centers on mosque-based worship, Friday prayers, Ramadan, and Eid, contributing to a distinct Sunni Arab identity in central and northern Iraq.

=== Politics ===
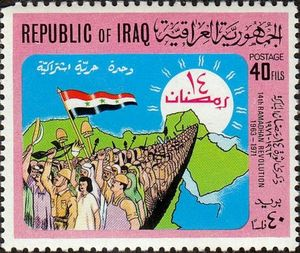
Ba'athist-era stamp depitcting Iraq as part of the broader Arab world. This correlation with Sunni Islam being the dominant religion in the Arab world and Sunni Arabs being in power was heavily taken advantage of in Ba'athist-era politics.

Sunni Arabs were the backbone of Saddam Hussein's Ba'athist Iraq regime. Under the Ba'athist regime, Sunni Arabs were portrayed in propaganda as the closest to the rest of the Arab world, fostering unity between Iraq and the rest of the Arab world. This benefited the Sunni minority as Iraqi identity was pushed to be closely tied to Arab socialist and Pan-Arabist ideologies, heavily influenced by Nasserist views originating in revolutionary Egypt. The pre-2003 Iraqi state reflected Sunni norms and culture, positioning Sunni Iraqis as the standard of national identity and enforced during Shia revolts against the state, such as the 1991 Iraqi uprisings. This has led to certain Ba'athist symbols such as the former flag of the Iraqi Republic under Ba'athism being reinterpreted as a distinctly Sunni symbol following its replacement in 2008. During the Iran–Iraq War, Ba'athist narratives portrayed Sunni-led Iraq as the last line of Arab and Sunni defense against Shia Iran, reinforcing a sense of historical mission and communal pride. Following the 2003 invasion of Iraq, Sunni Arabs became targeted by Shia militias. Due to continued repression by the Shia-led government, Sunni Islamist and Ba'athist armed groups such as the Naqshabandi Army took up arms against the government during the 2012–2013 Iraqi protests. This led to the 2013 Anbar campaign and beginning of the War in Iraq against the Islamic State which lasted until December 2017. This was followed by Sunni Arab calls for their own autonomous region in Iraq.

Map of the proposed Sunni Region, showing the areas of the country with a Sunni Arab demographic majority

During the sectarian conflict in Iraq, sectarian militias not only killed due to sect, but also due to family names, accents, physical appearances, and origins which could have implied their sectarian affiliation. In Iraq, by the 21st century, Sunni Arab converts to Shia Islam continued to be considered Sunni, while Shia Arab converts to Sunni Islam also continued to be considered Shia. The terms became identifiers for the two distinct Arab subgroups and began to transcend sectarian values. Ethnic Arab Christians in Iraq, distinct from Assyrians, were culturally identical with Sunni Arabs and well integrated together, thus often being included in the Sunni designation.

Nouri al-Maliki's Shia-led government repressed Sunnis, stressing the Sunni Arab tribes' favourable disposition towards the Islamic State, although they did not share the Salafist beliefs. A number of Sunnis have now taken up arms against the Islamic State to stop its attempts at establishing hegemony. In a survey in 2015, only 13 percent of Iraqi Sunni Arabs believed that their central government in Baghdad was heading in the right direction.

Today, Iraqi Sunni Arabs are represented in politics primarily by the secularist Progress Party and the mixed Sunni-secular Azem Alliance, historically after 2003 they were represented by the Iraqi Islamic Party and other groups associated with the Iraqi Accord Front, as well as the National Dialogue Front, the National Movement for Development and Reform, the Nasserist Socialist Vanguard Party, and the Uniters for Reform Coalition (Muttahidoon). While these parties have provided platforms for Sunni political engagement, their integration into the broader national framework remains slow and uneven. Persistent political marginalization, internal fragmentation, and ongoing instability continue to limit their overall influence in Iraqi politics.

According to a report published in 2015, there were about 9 million Sunni Arabs in Iraq.

== Non-Arab groups ==
=== Kurds ===
Iraqi Sunni Kurds
کوردی سوننەی عێراق
- Flag of Kurdistan

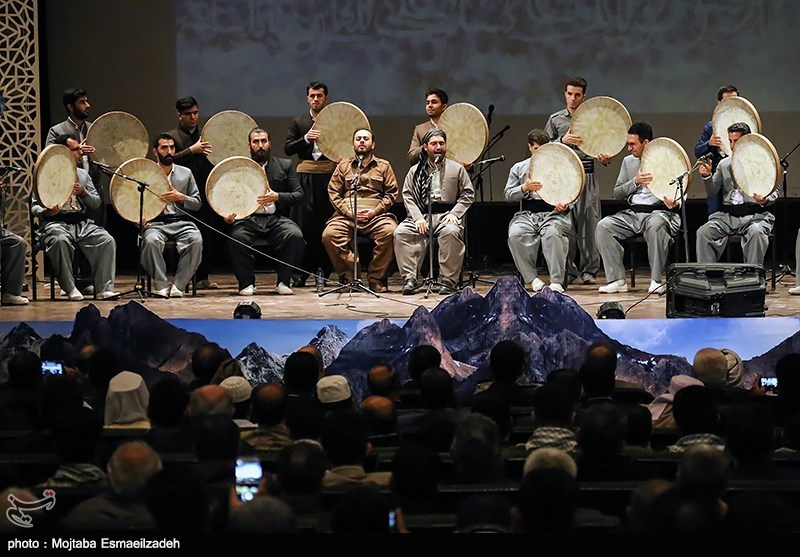
- Muslim Kurd Martyrs Congress in 2017

Total population
- 4,000,000

Regions with significant populations
- Iraqi Kurdistan

Languages
- Central Kurdish

95% of Iraqi Kurds are Sunni Muslims, while the remaining 5% are Shia Muslims. As a result of the spread of Islam, Sunni Islam (Shafi’i) became the dominant religion of the Kurdish people. There exists the Feyli Kurds who follow Shia Islam, namely Twelver Shiism. Islam is thought to be a religion of governance as well as spirituality, Kurds make sure to keep both their spiritual identity and national identity strong. Their practices and beliefs are very similar to those of Sunni Arabs.

Kurdish Sunnis have paid more attention to its Sufi dimensions in its manifestations within the sphere, particularly the Naqshbandi and Qadiri orders. As for Kurdish researchers themselves, due to the predominance of political reality and nationalist tendencies in academic discourse, they have rarely studied Kurdish religious identity. Consequently, the history of Islam in Kurdistan has remained obscure and is viewed as complementary to the general history of Sunnism within the Islamic sphere. Hence, the difficulty of studying Islam and exploring the nature of the Kurds' understanding of it and its role in shaping and directing their collective imagination, as well as the characteristics of this understanding and its manifestations at both the popular and elite levels.

Haider Lashkari, the assistant professor of the History of Religions at Koya University in the Iraqi Kurdistan Region, traces the historical formation of Sunni Kurds. This does not mean that other Islamic sects are absent from the religious map in Kurdistan, especially in modern times. “In addition to Sunnis, there are groups that have retained their old beliefs, or even those that have adopted non-Sunni doctrines and trends, even if they are considered unacceptable by Sunnis. Nevertheless, Kurds were viewed in the Islamic public sphere as part of the Sunni world and of the Shafi'i school of thought, to the point that expressions such as “Sunni Kurds” or “Shafi'i Kurds” became clearly understood and significant, and even a title for their religious identity. They were so religiously identified with this affiliation that non-Kurds were surprised by a Kurd who followed a non-Sunni school of thought.

The researcher points to the spread of Sufi orders in Kurdistan in later periods. In the fifteenth century, their followers and disciples were spread throughout Kurdistan, including Qadiriyya, Rifaiyya, Hurufiyya, Suhrawardiyya, Kubrawiyya, and others. However, over time, this number dwindled, and most orders disappeared, leaving only the Qadiriyya and Naqshbandi orders. Lashkri traces the influence of Sunni Islam on the Kurdish mentality, despite the difficulty of "clearly observing the impact of Sunni Islam on the Kurdish personality, due to the lack of texts produced by Kurdish religious scholars discussing the society in which they lived. Therefore, what can be said in this area applies to the mental representations produced by the general religious education system and how society received the religious personality of its members. On the social level, Kurdish individuals and tribal groups differed in their representation of this Sunni identity, according to their historical influence and proximity to the religious centers of authority. This reflected their affiliation with the Islamic nation-state, or lack thereof, to the extent that they represented and were aware of this identity."

=== Turkmens ===
Iraqi Sunni Turkmen
عراقلو سنی توركمن Iraklı Sünni Türkmen
- Flag of Turkmeneli is used by Sunni Turkmen

Regions with significant populations
- Turkmeneli

Languages
- Iraqi Turkish

Primarily Iraqi Turkmen are Sunni Muslims, most Iraqi Turkmen are politically secular yet remain practicing, having internalized the secularist interpretation of state–religion affairs practiced in the Republic of Turkey. The religious and tribal factors and tensions inherent in Iraq's political culture do not significantly affect the Iraqi Turkmen.

== Shiaphobia ==
In June 2014, Pew Research Center published a report citing a survey conducted in late 2011, according to which 14% of Iraqi Sunnis said that Shias are not Muslims — by contrast, only 1% of Iraqi Shias said that Sunnis are not Muslims.

== Notable people ==
Notable Iraqi Sunnis, or people of Iraqi Sunni descent include:

=== Politics ===
- Nuri al-Said (1888–1958), prime minister of the Kingdom of Iraq for eight terms
- Mahmud Barzanji (1878–1956), the king of Kurdistan
- Abdul-Rahman al-Bazzaz (1913 – 1973), former prime minister and 2nd Secretary General of OPEC
- Abdul Rahman Arif (1916–2007), former president and prime minister of Iraq.
- Mustafa Barzani (1903–1979), leader of the Kurdistan Democratic Party (KDP) and head of Kurdish revolts
- Ahmed Hassan al-Bakr (1914–1982), first president of Iraq from the Ba'ath Party
- Saddam Hussein (1937–2006), longest serving president of Iraq
- Mithal al-Alusi, Sunni Arab politician and activist known for advocating democratic reforms.
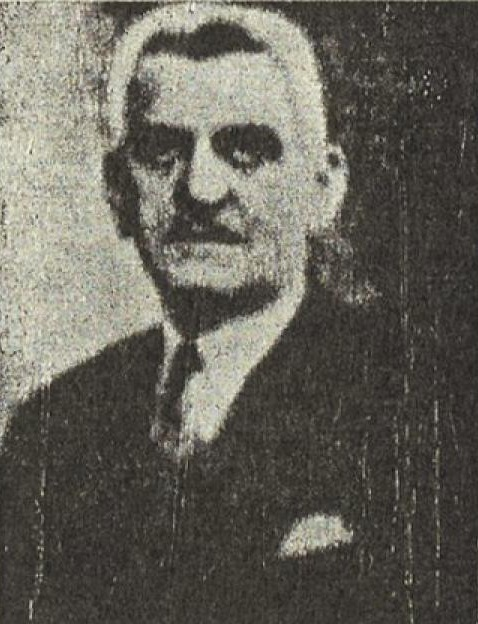
Hamdi al-Pachachi

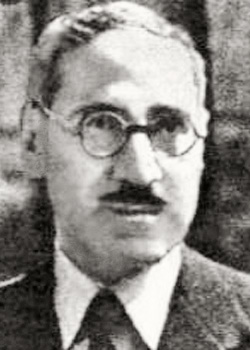
Rashid Ali al-Gaylani

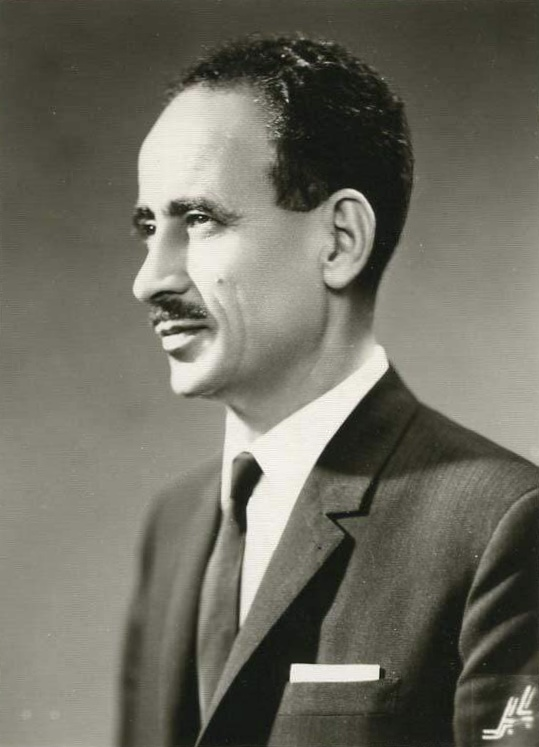
Abdul Rahman Arif

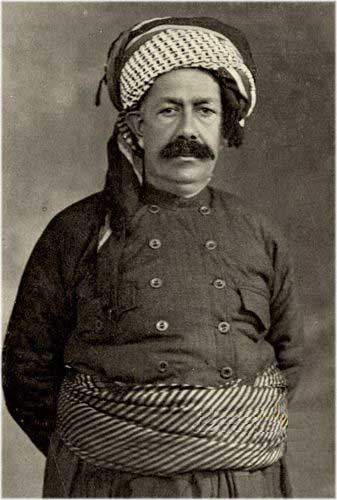
Mahmud Barzanji

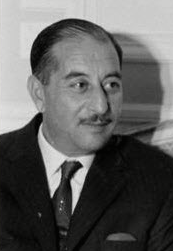
Ahmed Hassan al-Bakr

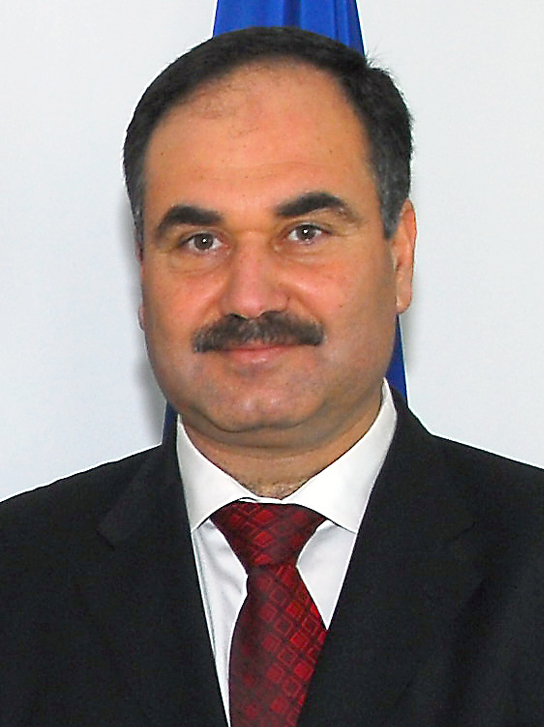
Rafi al-Issawi

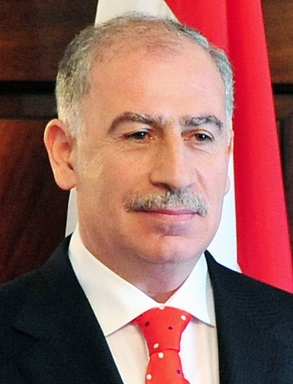
Osama al-Nujaifi

=== Diplomats ===
- Fareed Mustafa Kamil Yasseen (b. 1956), former Iraqi Ambassador to the United States and France and diplomatic adviser to Adil Abd al-Mahdi
- Adnan Pachachi (1923–2019), Iraq's Permanent Representative to the United Nations and foreign minister
- Nadim al-Pachach (1914–1976), Secretary-General of OPEC from January 1971 until December 1972. i
- Shathel Taqa
- Ahmad Muhammad Yahya* Ahmad Muhammad Yahya* Ahmad Muhammad Yahya
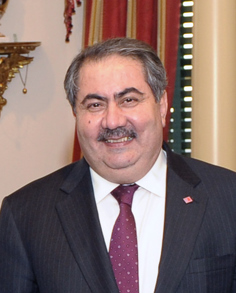
Hoshyar Zebari

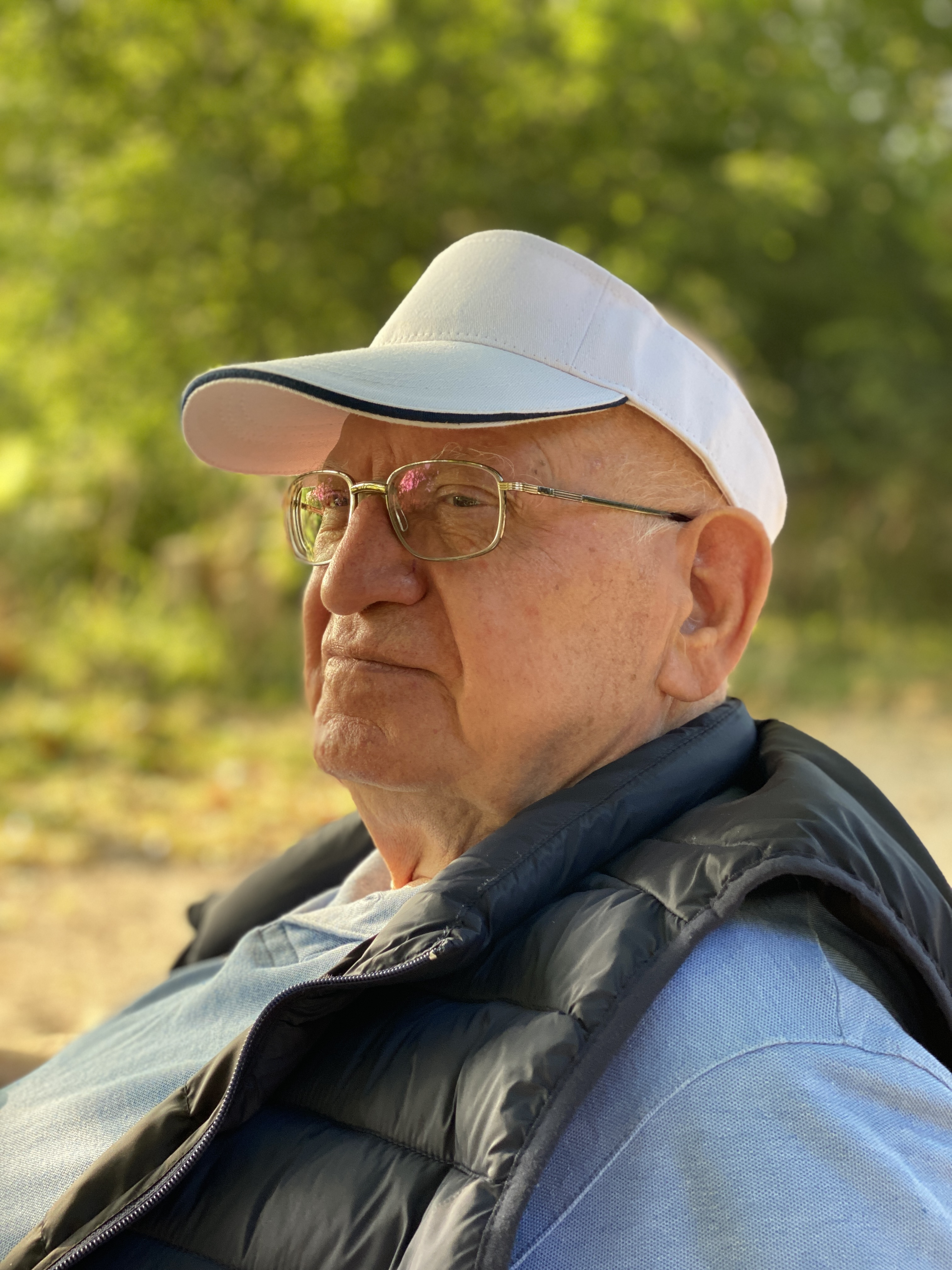
Faruq Ziada

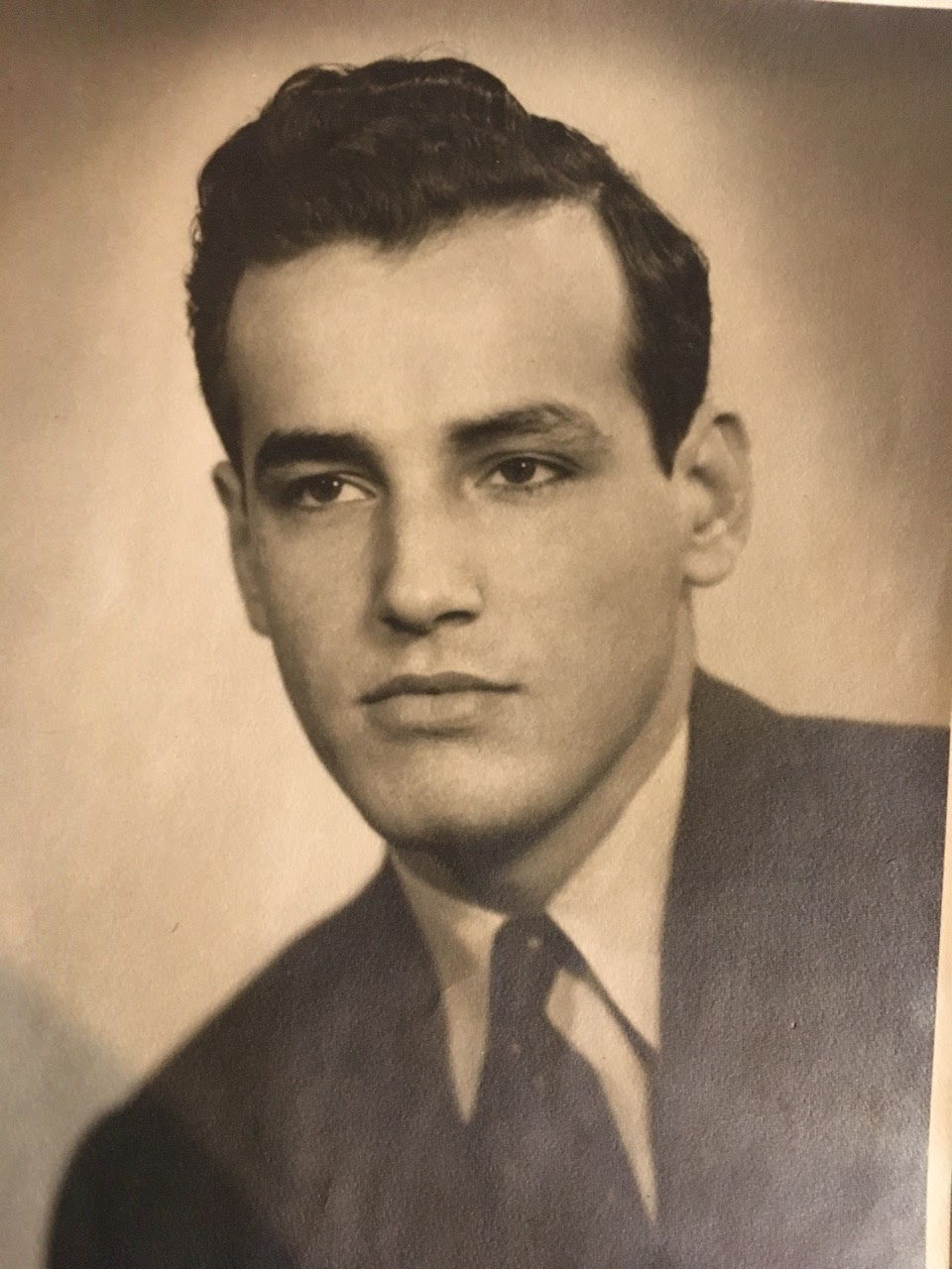

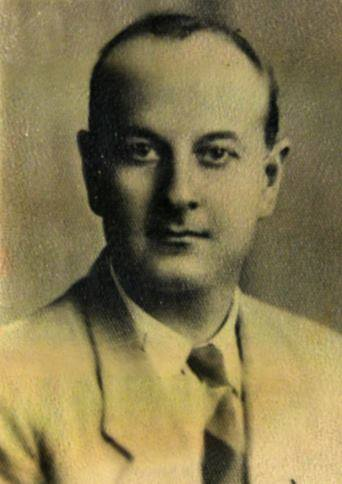

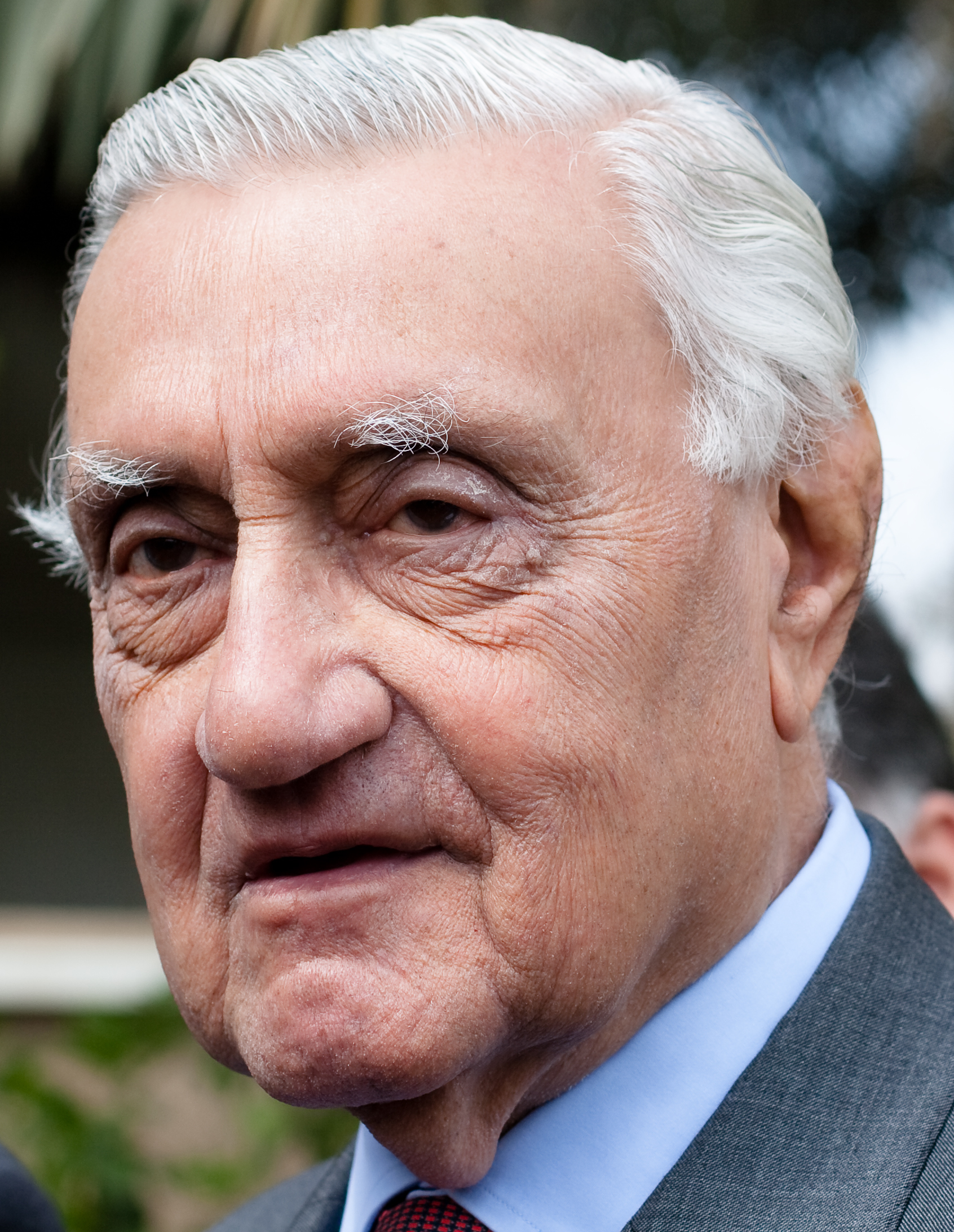

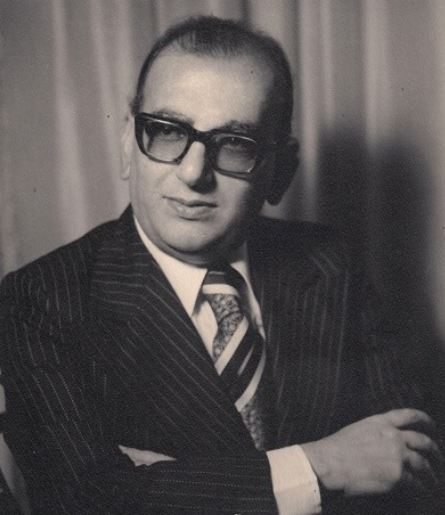

=== Architects ===
- Zaha Hadid, architect born in Baghdad, known for contemporary architecture. She was the first woman to receive the Pritzker Architecture Prize.
- Hisham Munir
- Jawad Saleem
- Raed Jarrar

=== Writers ===
- Dhu'l-Nun Ayyub
- Majid Khadduri
- Foulath Hadid
- Bahija Khalil Ismail
- Souad Naji Al-Azzawi
- Abdullah Goran
- Mariwan Halabjaee
- Hashim Al-Witry
- Mustafa Zalmi
- Namir Noor-Eldeen
- Kajal Ahmad
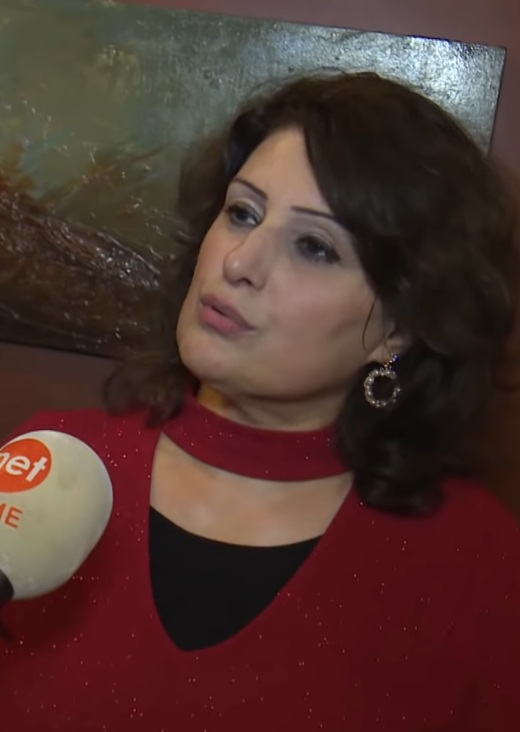

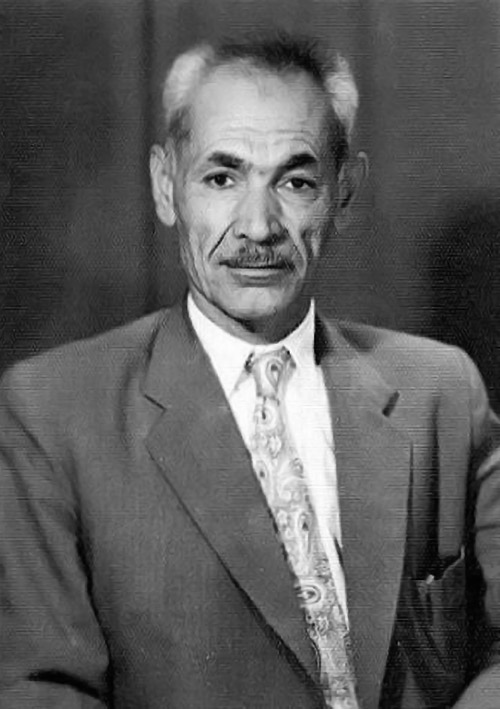

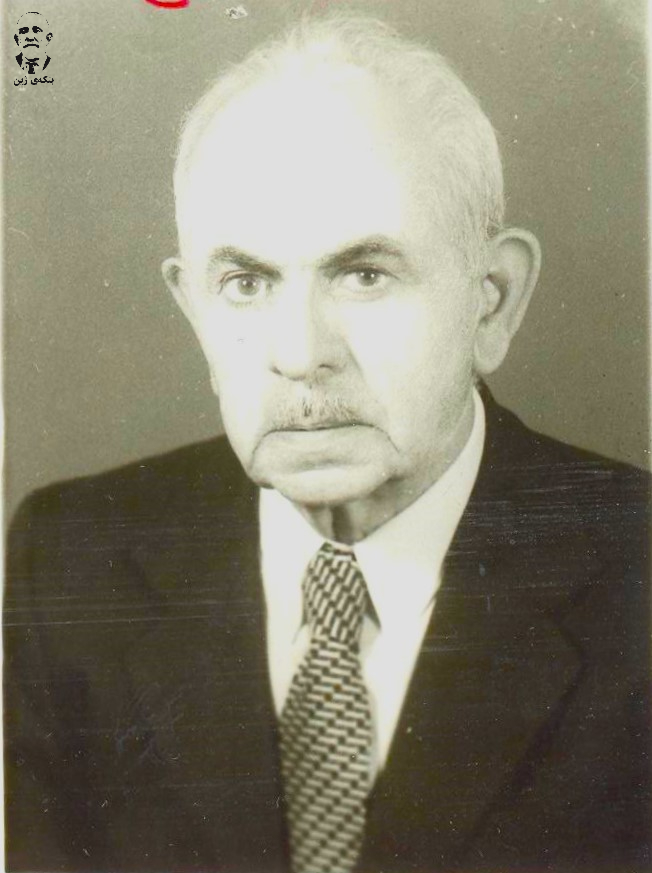

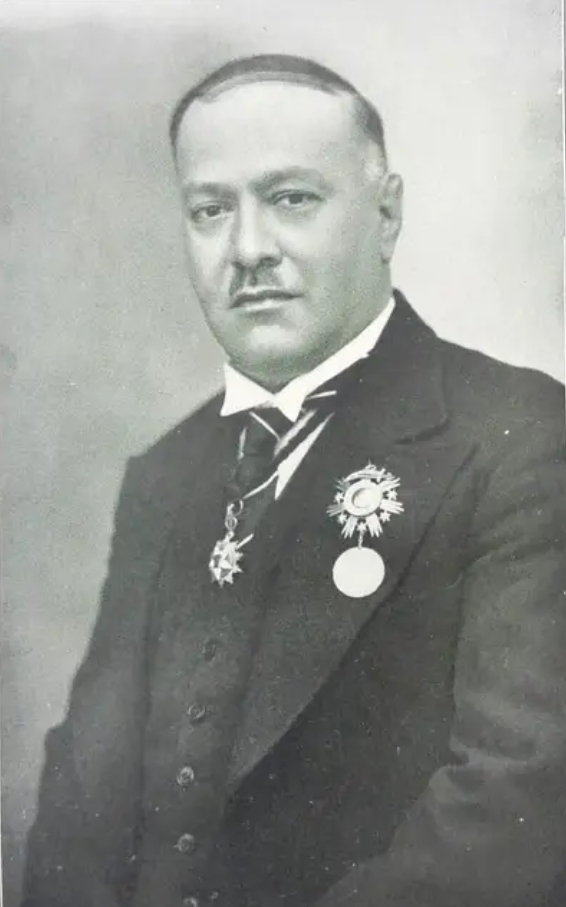

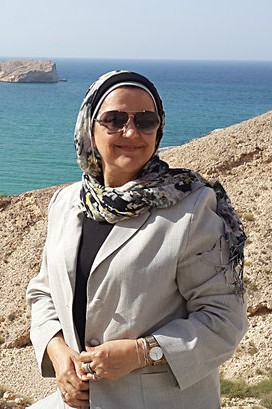

=== Movies and music ===
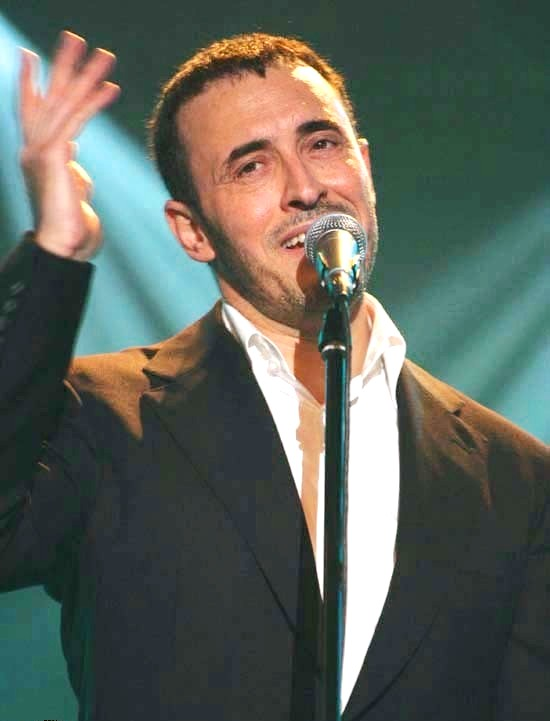
Kadim Al Sahir is recognized worldwide for blending classical Arabic poetry with modern music.

- Kadim Al Sahir, Singer, composer, and songwriter from Mosul, recognized for his contributions to Arabic music. Nicknamed “The Caesar,” was born in Mosul to a Sunni father from Samarra and a Shia mother from Najaf
- Ahmed Albasheer, television presenter and satirist, known for hosting The Albasheer Show, a political satire program.
- Omar Borkan Al Gala, model and actor, born in Baghdad and raised in the Gulf region, active in fashion and media.
- Ilham al-Madfai, musician and singer, known for blending Western guitar with traditional Iraqi music.

=== Business ===
- Nemir Kirdar
- Basima Abdulrahman
- Sirwan Barzani, Managing Director of Korek Telecom since 2000
- Aqeel Moften

=== Army ===
- Adnan Khairallah
- Salah Aboud Mahmoud
- Khaled al-Obaidi
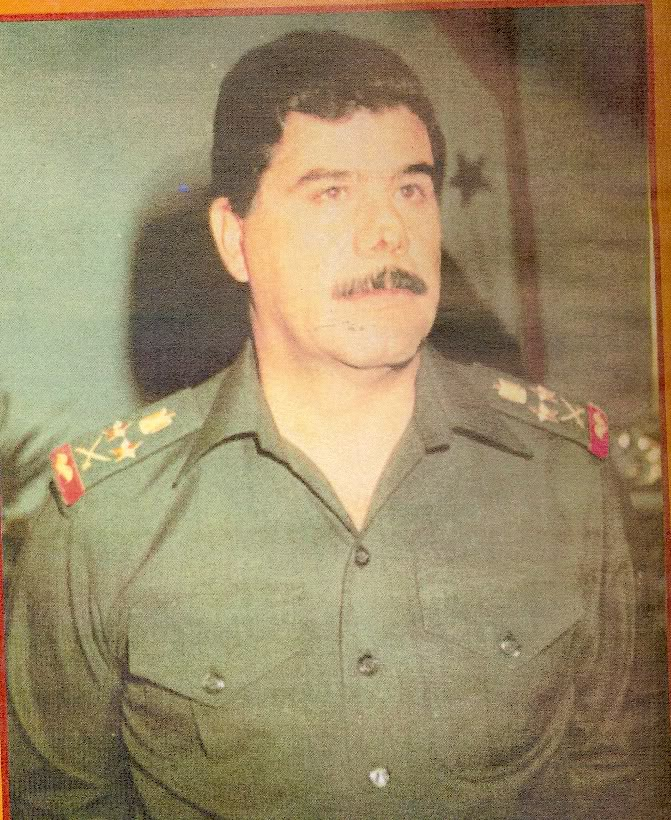

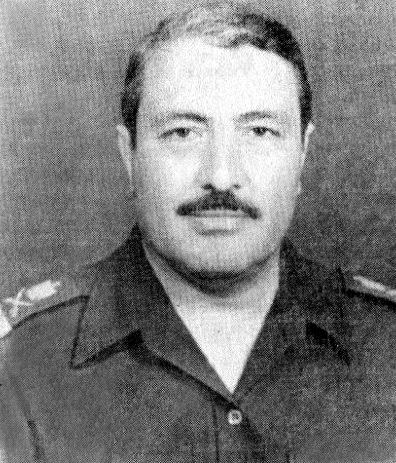

== See also ==
- Demographics of Iraq
- Sectarian violence against Sunni Arabs in Iraq
