= Hypothetical partition of Iraq =

Hypothetical disintegration of Iraq

A rough map of Iraq's ethnoreligious divide, with Shias in red (east), Sunnis in green (west), and Kurds in yellow (northeast)

The Partition of Iraq refers to the act of dividing the country into administrative divisions with either full or partial sovereignty.

== Overview ==
A hypothetical partition of the former kind of full sovereignty would render the country divided into several independent states, commonly proposed along ethnoreligious lines such as a tripartite separation based on the country’s main components; that is, the Shias, Sunnis and Kurds. This notion never gained significant support and the new Iraqi constitution adopted in 2005 defines Iraq as a "single, federal, independent, fully sovereign state", explicitly prohibiting secession and the division of sovereignty. However, the latter kind of partial sovereignty was arguably the de facto status quo in the form of loose confederalism, with Kurdistan Region possessing significant autonomy until the late 2010s when the Iraqi central government (with the aid of the Supreme Court) began to exert control over it and strip it of its autonomy.

== Salahuddin Conference ==
The current political system of Iraq was first proposed after the Gulf War by some members of the Iraqi opposition against Saddam Hussein's rule. In June 1992, a conference was held in Vienna, Austria, during which the Iraqi National Congress (INC) led by Ahmed Chalabi was created. Another conference held in October 1992, called the Salahuddin Conference, was held in Kurdish-controlled northern Iraq after the enforcement of the no-fly zone in northern Iraq. During the latter conference, the INC was expanded to include the two main Kurdish political parties; namely Kurdistan Democratic Party and Patriotic Union of Kurdistan as well as several other opposition parties. During the Salahuddin Conference, federalism coupled with decentralization was adopted as the official model and vision for a post-Saddam Iraq by INC, as a way to avoid a repeat of Saddam's tyrannical regime, which was heavily centralized. As this came after the Kurds gained self-rule in northern Iraq, the model was seen as an acknowledgement of that newly gained autonomy, but at the same time an approach inherently opposed to Kurdish independence. The Shi'i Islamist parties such as the Islamic Dawa Party and Sunni Arab nationalist parties opposed this approach, which was a kind of agreement of compromise, for the reason that it would only serve to fragmentalize the country.

== Post-2003 ==
After the invasion of Iraq, contrary to the vision adopted during the Salahuddin Conference, the Kurdistan Democratic Party initially sought to gain international backing for an independent Kurdistan and separate entirely from Iraq, but when no such support surfaced they practically conceded for reunification with Iraq —albeit under a loose confederal arrangement wherein the Kurdistan Region would (at least practically) enjoy a high degree of autonomy. However, flaws in the new Iraqi constitution hastily adopted in 2005, as well as the lack of necessary legislation that would solidify federalism, have allowed successive governments in Baghdad to resist federalization and decentralization and instead increase central control.

== See also ==
- Federal regions of Iraq
