= Anti-Sunni violence in Iraq =

Crimes against Sunni Arabs in Iraq

Sectarian violence against Iraqi Sunni Arabs
- Part of the Iraqi conflict and War against the Islamic State
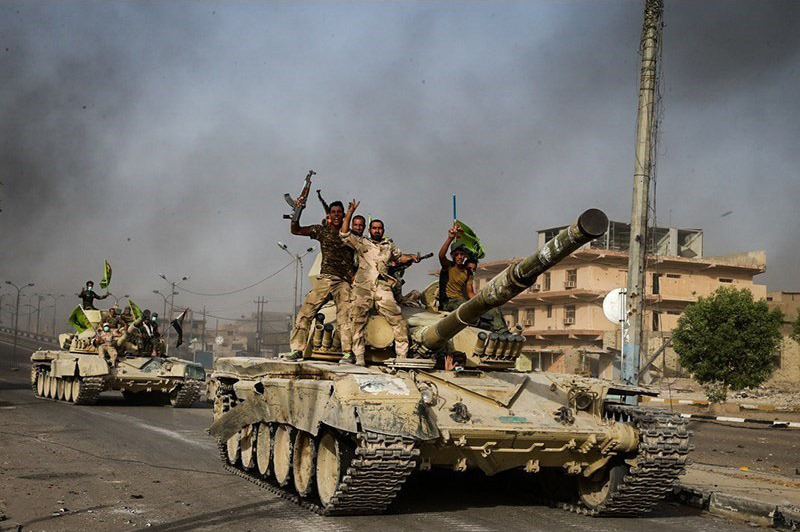
- Popular Mobilization Forces enter Fallujah in 2016
- Location: Iraq
- Date: 2003–present
- Target: Iraqi Sunni Arabs
- Attack type: Genocide (alleged); Revenge killing; Mass killing; Abduction; Torture; Extrajudicial killing; Summary execution; Forced displacement; Enforced disappearance
- Deaths: More than 100,000 (Note: Includes estimated 40,000 killed during 2005–2006, 20,000 killed during 2006–2007, 22,000 killed during 2014–2016 and "tens of thousands" of victims of enforced disappearance confirmed dead in 2022)
- Victims: 28,000 forcibly disappeared (2014–2017), 9,000 sentenced to death, thousands detained and tortured (European Union Agency for Asylum)
- Perpetrators: Iraq; Federal government of Iraq; Iraqi Security Forces; (Kurdistan Region) Kurdistan Regional Government; Peshmerga; Asayish; Special Groups (2007–2011); Popular Mobilisation Forces; Various Shia militias; 50th Brigade; Yazidi militias
- Motive: Revenge; Ethnic cleansing; Counterterrorism; Anti-Sunnism; Shia fundamentalism; De-Ba'athification

Since the US-led invasion of Iraq and the creation of the new Iraqi state, there have been reports of Iranian-backed Iraqi Shia militias supported by the Iraqi central government indiscriminately killing Sunni Arabs. In 2005, the post-Saddam Iraqi government that came to be dominated by Shia political parties was accused of operating death squads intending to commit genocide. Such reports intensified during the Iraqi civil war from 2006 to 2008 and the War in Iraq from 2014 to 2017 against the Islamic State. Peshmerga and Asayish have also "prosecuted, detained and tortured" Iraqi Sunni Arabs. According to an Amnesty International report, attacks conducted by Shia militias against Sunni civilians were carried out "driven by revenge" for previous attacks committed by Sunni ISIS against Shia civilians. There have also been reports of Yazidi militias targeting Sunni Arab civilians after the Yazidi genocide, and reports of Christian militias ethnically cleansing Sunni Arabs from Tel Keppe.

== History ==
Following the 2003 invasion of Iraq and the implementation of De-Ba’athification laws, thousands of Sunni Arab workers all around Iraq were removed from their positions. After the 2003 invasion, Sunni Arabs grew increasingly alienated from the rest of Iraq. Before the invasion, Iraq had been politically dominated by Sunni Arabs for over 80 years, and the end of Sunni Arab dominance caused many armed revolts instantly after the 2003 invasion.

Subsequently, following the end of the CPA government, Iran-backed Shia factions rapidly consolidated power over the Iraqi government. After the rise of Shia Islamist parties, the Sunni community was widely suspected of being former regime loyalists or insurgents. Iran-backed Shia militias began operating death squads that targeted Sunni Arabs with abduction, torture, and execution under the pretext of anti-terror operations. In cities with mixed populations, such as Baghdad, entire Sunni neighborhoods were ethnically cleansed.

According to a report published in 2006 citing a senior Iraqi Sunni politician, an estimated 40,000 Iraqi Sunnis were killed during the tenure of prime minister Ibrahim al-Jafari.

On 12 August 2007, Iraq's most senior Sunni politician, Adnan al-Dulaimi, called on Arab states to stop what he called an "unprecedented genocide campaign" by Iranian-backed Shia militias.

Sunni clerics, politicians, tribe leaders, and ordinary civilians were subject to targeted killings, unlawful detentions, and torture. While Abu Ghraib prison was initially infamous for the US Army prisoner abuses, it was later handed to the Iraqi government and became notorious for similar abuses. Sunni detainees were regularly targeted for various abuses, while Shia detainees were left alone.

After the Islamic State quickly captured large Sunni-majority areas such as Mosul, Ramadi, and Fallujah, the Iraqi government further suspected Sunni Arabs of supporting extremist groups. Following the defeat of the Islamic State, the Iraqi Army and allied Shia militias placed entire Sunni populations under collective punishment. Families of suspected IS members were denied documentation, displaced en masse, and barred from returning to their homes, even when they had no known connection to the Islamic State.

Militias of the Popular Mobilization Forces carried out extrajudicial executions, looting, and the destruction of Sunni property, often without accountability from the Iraqi government. It has been estimated that around 22,000 Iraqi Sunnis have been killed between 2014 and 2016 amid sectarian violence, while thousands of families have fled their homes. By 2017, the PMF had destroyed 345 Sunni homes to the west of Mosul after retaking them from ISIS, which according to Human Rights Watch had "no apparent military necessity" and may have qualified to be considered war crimes.

Furthermore, Human Rights Watch called on the United States and other Western states that had given equipment to Iraq in order to fight against IS to use their leverage to force the Iraqi government to investigate allegations of war crimes and human rights violations and abuses against Sunni Arabs. According to Amnesty International, Shia militias have operated with "total impunity" regarding their war crimes against Sunnis, in retaliation for attacks by the Islamic State. This is primarily due to Iraqi Prime Minister Nouri al-Maliki's assertion that Sunni Arabs hold a favorable disposition towards IS.

In Jurf al-Nasr, the Sunni population was ethnically cleansed to create a security buffer zone between the Al-Anbar governorate and the Shia holy cities of Najaf and Karbala, where 3,000 Sunni homes were razed and 7,000 Sunni families were displaced and not allowed to return. In Nineveh governorate, Yazidi militias entered several Sunni Arab settlements and began massacring civilians as revenge for the Yazidi genocide. Shia Turkmen militias in Tuz Khurmatu harassed, kidnapped, arbitrarily detained, tortured, and killed Sunni Arab civilians, while looting and destroying their houses, as well as blocking the return of Sunni Arab residents in Tuz Khurmatu and Kirkuk. Said Turkmen militias engaged in significant destruction of homes and property of Sunni Arabs. Several human rights groups and local informants claimed that the destruction of Sunni Arab homes by Shia Turkmen militias showed patterns of an effort to permanently change the demographics. The Shabak Militia also targeted Sunni Arab civilians in revenge for Islamic State crimes against Shabaks.

In Tuz Khurmatu, where the south was controlled by Shia militias, mostly Turkmen, and the north was controlled by the Peshmerga, both factions targeted Sunni Arabs and expelled them.

During the war against the Islamic State, additional waves of displacement occurred, with up to 1.5 million Sunni Arabs displaced by 2018, many of whom remained in camps or were refused reentry into their former communities. After 2003, tens of thousands of Sunnis were killed by Shia militias in sectarian clashes. Over 20,000 Sunnis had died from 2006 to 2007 alone, with the numbers increasing by the thousands over the years. The violence decreased in 2017 and largely stopped by 2018.

Shia Arab leaders often dismissed Sunni grievances as exaggerated or illegitimate, framing their demands as attempts to relive Ba'athist nostalgia. Kurdish leaders offered limited battlefield support but were reluctant to offer extensive help to Sunni Arabs due to the persecution of Kurds by Saddam Hussein. International organizations, including the UN, condemned sectarian violence and collective punishment, but interventions were limited in scope and effect.

A 2020 report published by the European Union Agency for Asylum stated that Iraqi Sunni Arabs experienced torture and "other forms of ill treatment" because of family name, tribal affiliation or area of origin, as a form of "collective punishment and stigmatisation by government forces, other armed groups and the community".

The yearly US Department of State Report on International Religious Freedom in 2022 stated that Sunni Arabs represented about 90% of all prisoners in allegedly illegal detention in Iraq, including 9,000 that received death sentences. In 2023, Iraqi parliamentary speaker Mohamed Al-Halbousi stated that Iran-backed militias supporting the Iraqi government had kidnapped and executed thousands of Sunni Arab men and boys between 2013 and 2017. Opposition analyst Ahmed al-Mahmud stated that "Halbousi has effectively confirmed that the Iraqi government has engaged in a sectarian genocide against its own people, the Sunni Arabs.”
