= Ahmad Muhammad Yahya =

Ahmad Muhammad Yahya was born in the Mosul region in 1916 and died in Baghdad in 1998.

== Early life and education ==
He completed his primary and secondary studies in Mosul, joined the Military College in 1933 and graduated from it in 1935 with the rank of Second Lieutenant. Graduated from the Staff College in 1942 with the rank of Chief of Staff.

== Career ==
=== Military career ===
Ahmad Muhammad Yahya became a private escort to King Faisal II when he was in London with him. After the events of Basra in 1953 and the proclamation of martial law, he was appointed commander of the military forces in the Basra region, knowing that he was in the rank of lieutenant colonel. Then he assumed the position of commander of the fifteenth brigade in Basra in 1954, then commanded the Basra site until 1956. He returned to Baghdad to become head of the Iraqi military mission to the Hashemite Kingdom of Jordan and continued in this position until the declaration of the Hashemite union between the Iraqi and Jordanian kingdoms.

=== Political career ===
He remained in Jordan as part of the military mission there until the revolution of July 14, 1958. In a period after the revolution, he was appointed as Iraq's ambassador to Saudi Arabia, but he did not have the opportunity to join his position due to the disagreement that occurred between the two leaders, Abd al-Karim Qasim and Abd Salam Aref, so he was appointed Minister of Interior to succeed Abdul Salam Aref on October 1, 1958. He also assumed the position of Acting Minister of Agrarian Reform after the dismissal of Mr. Ibrahim Kubba on February 16, 1960. He continued in the positions of Minister of Interior and Minister of Agrarian Reform until the revolution of February 8, 1963 and the fall of the government of Abdul al-Karim Qasim, when he was arrested and sentenced to five years’ imprisonment. In April, 1964, he was released and he retreated to his home in Baghdad until his death in 1998.
