= Deaths in June 2016 =

The following is a list of notable deaths in June 2016.

Entries for each day are listed alphabetically by surname. A typical entry lists information in the following sequence:

- Name, age, country of citizenship and reason for notability, established cause of death, reference.

== June 2016 ==
=== 1 ===
- William Harrison Bell, 89, American surgeon.
- Leonard Boyle, 85, New Zealand Roman Catholic prelate, Bishop of Dunedin (1983–2005).
- Agostino Coletto, 88, Italian racing cyclist.
- David Daniell, 87, English literary scholar.
- Roger Enrico, 71, American businessman (PepsiCo, DreamWorks), snorkeling incident.
- Razak Khan, 65, Indian film actor (Baadshah, Hello Brother, Akhiyon Se Goli Maare), heart attack.
- Boyce F. Martin Jr., 80, American judge, Chief Judge of the United States Court of Appeals for the Sixth Circuit (1996–2003), brain cancer.
- Richard B. McHugh, 92, American statistician.
- Grigore Obreja, 48, Romanian sprint canoeist, world champion (1994), Olympic bronze medallist (1996).
- Kosit Panpiemras, 73, Thai banker (Bangkok Bank), cancer.
- Bob Rumball, 86, Canadian pastor and deaf rights advocate.
- John Simpson, 89, Australian Olympic fencer.
- Dalpat Singh Paraste, 66, Indian politician, MP for Shahdol (2004–2009), brain hemorrhage.
- David Spielberg, 77, American actor (Christine, Wiseguy, ER).
- John Taylor, 87, British Anglican bishop and theologian.
- Wang Jui, 85, Taiwanese actor, Golden Bell winner (1991, 1997, 2014).

=== 2 ===
- Klaus Biemann, 89, Austrian-born American biochemist.
- Walter Curley, 93, American diplomat, Ambassador to Ireland (1975–1977) and France (1989–1993).
- Alvin J. DeGrow, 90, American politician.
- Donny Everett, 19, American baseball player (Vanderbilt Commodores), drowned.
- Fulvio Galimi, 89, Argentine Olympic fencer (1948, 1952).
- Darko Grubor, 53, Serbian executive.
- Don Hardeman, 63, American football player.
- Sir Tom Kibble, 83, British physicist.
- Wayne Kingery, 88, American football player (Baltimore Colts).
- Pál Koczka, 77, Hungarian Olympic basketball player.
- Keith Lawrence, 96, New Zealand-born British flight lieutenant during World War II, surviving member of The Few.
- Yevhen Lemeshko, 85, Ukrainian football coach.
- Abderrahmane Meziani, 74, Algerian footballer (USM Alger).
- Dan Henry Nicolson, 82, American botanist.
- Andrzej Niemczyk, 72, Polish volleyball coach, European champion (2003, 2005).
- Sir John Pidgeon, 89, Australian property developer.
- Ulrik Plesner, 85, Danish architect.
- Lee Pfund, 96, American baseball player (Brooklyn Dodgers) and college baseball and basketball coach (Wheaton College).
- Willis Pyle, 101, American animator (Pinocchio, Bambi, Mr. Magoo).
- Brian Reidy, 77, New Zealand rugby league player (Auckland, national team).
- Helen Renton, 85, British air force officer, director of the WRAF (1980–1986).
- Kat Teasdale, 51, Canadian racing driver and businesswoman.
- Renato Valentini, 69, Italian Olympic ski jumper.
- Freddie Wadling, 64, Swedish singer and songwriter.
- Häns'che Weiss, 64–65, German jazz guitarist.

=== 3 ===
- Yevgeny Agureyev, 65, Russian field hockey player and administrator.
- Muhammad Ali, 74, American boxer, Olympic gold medalist (1960), three-time WBC world heavyweight champion (1964, 1974, 1978), septic shock.
- Balu Anand, 61, Indian actor, heart attack.
- Szabolcs Baranyi, 72, Hungarian tennis player.
- Sreten Asanović, 85, Montenegrin author.
- Adolph Cornelis van Bruggen, 86, Dutch malacologist.
- Henry Childs, 65, American football player (New Orleans Saints), heart attack.
- Mac Cocker, 74, English-born Australian radio presenter (2JJ, 105.7 ABC Darwin).
- Stephen Gasiorowicz, 87, American theoretical physicist.
- George Grosse, 86, American politician.
- Bernard Gotfryd, 92, Polish-born American photographer.
- Morris Jennings, 77, American drummer.
- Jocelyn Lovell, 65, Canadian Olympic cyclist (1968, 1972, 1976), Commonwealth (1978) and Pan American Games (1971, 1975) gold medalist.
- Sten Lundin, 84, Swedish motocross racer, world champion (1959, 1961).
- Leonard Marchand, 82, Canadian politician, Minister of Environment (1976, 1977–1979), Senator (1984–1998), first Aboriginal federal cabinet minister.
- Jeff W. Mathis III, 60, American major general.
- Joseph Michel, 90, Belgian politician, President of the Belgian Chamber of Representatives (1980–1981), Minister of the Interior (1974–1977, 1986–1988).
- Ken Morioka, 49, Japanese musician and composer (Soft Ballet), heart failure.
- J. Keith Murnighan, 67, American social scientist and author.
- Murray Murrell, 93, Australian football player (Collingwood).
- Victor Reux, 86, French Saint Pierre and Miquelon politician.
- Luis Salom, 24, Spanish motorcycle racer, race collision.
- Sabam Siagian, 84, Indonesian journalist, editor-in-chief of The Jakarta Post (1983–1991), Ambassador to Australia (1991–1994).
- Arve Solstad, 80, Norwegian newspaper editor (Dagbladet).
- Dave Swarbrick, 75, British folk musician and singer-songwriter (Fairport Convention), emphysema.
- Dennis Tedlock, 76, American anthropologist.
- Henrique N'zita Tiago, 88, Angolan separatist politician, President of the Armed Forces of Cabinda.

=== 4 ===
- Jeff Alltus, 61, American politician.
- Gil Bartosh, 86, American football player and coach.
- Frank Brown, 79, American Olympic skier.
- Annie Castledine, 77, British theatre director.
- Eamonn Cooke, 79, Irish DJ and criminal.
- Phyllis Curtin, 94, American soprano.
- Bobby Curtola, 73, Canadian singer.
- Sulabha Deshpande, 79, Indian actress.
- István Halász, 64, Hungarian footballer (Tatabánya, Vasas, national team).
- Antti Hyry, 84, Finnish writer.
- Geirmund Ihle, 81, Norwegian politician, MP (1969–1981).
- Nicky Jennings, 70, English footballer (Portsmouth, Exeter City).
- Rodney Johnson, 88, Australian Olympic sports shooter.
- Zoya Klyuchko, 83, Ukrainian entomologist.
- Piero Leddi, 85, Italian painter.
- Erich Linemayr, 83, Austrian football referee.
- Norman Longmate, 90, English historian.
- Sir Brian McGrath, 90, British courtier, private secretary to the Duke of Edinburgh.
- Carmen Pereira, 79, Bissau-Guinean politician, acting President (1984).
- Pulu Poumele, 44, American football player (San Diego Chargers, Baltimore Ravens).
- Alan Rathbone, 57, English rugby league player (Bradford, Warrington).
- Bill Richmond, 94, American television writer (The Carol Burnett Show, Three's Company) and screenwriter (The Nutty Professor).
- Farid Seiful-Mulyukov, 85, Uzbek-born Russian journalist and writer.
- Bill Snowden, 81, New Zealand rugby league player (Ponsonby, national team).
- Nicola Tanda, 87, Italian literary critic and philologist.
- William Wright, 85, American author.
- Mustafa Zalmi, 92, Iraqi Kurdish Muslim scholar.

=== 5 ===
- Manohar Aich, 104, Indian bodybuilder, Mr. Universe (1952).
- Gianluca Buonanno, 50, Italian politician, MEP (since 2014), traffic collision.
- Jerome Bruner, 100, American psychologist.
- David Gilkey, 50, American photojournalist, grenade explosion.
- Frank Griffin, 98, Irish judge.
- Julio Henri, Argentine Olympic equestrian.
- Taomati Iuta, 77, I-Kiribati politician, Vice President (1991–1994) and Speaker of the House (2003, 2007–2015), diabetes.
- David Lamb, 76, American war correspondent and journalist (Los Angeles Times).
- Abu Layla, 32, Syrian military commander, shot.
- Ortensia, 10, Australian thoroughbred racehorse, euthanized.
- Jarbas Passarinho, 96, Brazilian politician, Minister of Justice (1990–1992), Senate President (1981–1983), Governor of Pará (1964–1966).
- Cedric Robinson, 76, American political scientist.
- Patti Grace Smith, 68, American Federal Aviation Administration official, pancreatic cancer.
- Rick Speare, 68, Australian public health physician, traffic collision.
- Eleanor Zelliot, 89, American scholar.
- Aleksei Zharkov, 68, Russian actor, liver disease.

=== 6 ===
- Stuart Anderson, 93, American restaurateur (Black Angus Steakhouse).
- Rhoda Blumberg, 98, American author.
- Theresa Poh Lin Chan, 72, Singaporean writer and actress, lung cancer.
- Helen Fabela Chávez, 88, American labor unionist.
- Hélio Garcia, 85, Brazilian politician, Governor of Minas Gerais (1984–1987, 1991–1995).
- Harry Gregory, 72, English footballer (Charlton Athletic).
- John Harding, 2nd Baron Harding of Petherton, 88, British army officer and peer.
- Ayaz Jani, 48, Pakistani poet and journalist.
- Viktor Korchnoi, 85, Russian-born Swiss chess player.
- Basil McKenzie, 89, Jamaican Olympic sprinter.
- Remi Nadeau, 95, American historian.
- Federico José Pagura, 93, Argentinian Protestant minister, Bishop of the Evangelical Methodist Church of Argentina.
- Steve Pisanos, 96, Greek-born American air force officer.
- Theresa Saldana, 61, American actress (Raging Bull, The Commish, I Wanna Hold Your Hand), renal failure.
- Rolf Schweizer, 80, German composer.
- Sir Peter Shaffer, 90, British playwright (Amadeus, Equus, Black Comedy) and screenwriter, Tony (1975, 1981) and Oscar winner (1985).
- Kimbo Slice, 42, Bahamian-born American mixed martial artist (Bellator, UFC), boxer and actor (Merry Christmas, Drake & Josh), heart failure.
- Keith Smith, 87, New Zealand cricketer.
- Tunga, 64, Brazilian sculptor and performance artist, cancer.
- André Warusfel, 79, French mathematician and writer.
- Jimmy Williams, 90, Canadian baseball player and manager.
- Héctor Zumbado, 84, Cuban writer and comedian.

=== 7 ===
- Leandro Ribera Abad, 81, Spanish Olympic water polo player.
- Børge Bach, 71, Danish footballer (AaB).
- Åke Berntsson, 81, Swedish Olympic rower.
- Bretagne, 16, American Golden Retriever rescue dog, euthanized after kidney failure.
- Johnny Brooks, 84, English footballer (Tottenham Hotspur, Chelsea, Brentford).
- John H. Eicher, 95, American scientist and author.
- Tanju Gürsu, 77, Turkish actor and film director, respiratory failure.
- Amber Gurung, 78, Nepalese musician and composer (national anthem).
- Frans Harjawiyata, 84, Indonesian Roman Catholic abbot.
- Robert Hall, 85, Canadian politician.
- Leonard Hill, 68, American television executive and writer, property developer.
- Peter Jost, 95, British mechanical engineer.
- Stephen Keshi, 54, Nigerian football player (Anderlecht, Strasbourg) and manager (national team), heart attack.
- Sir Graham Latimer, 90, New Zealand Māori leader and politician.
- Marita Lindquist, 97, Finnish writer.
- Mary MacLeod, 78, English-born Scottish actress (If...., Enigma, Mapp & Lucia).
- Thomas Perkins, 84, American businessman (Kleiner Perkins Caufield & Byers).
- Anatoliy Polishchuk, 66, Soviet-Ukrainian volleyball player, Olympic silver medalist (1976).
- Rubén Quevedo, 37, Venezuelan baseball player (Chicago Cubs, Milwaukee Brewers), heart attack.
- Elayne Rapping, 77, American writer, breast cancer.
- Sean Rooks, 46, American basketball player (Dallas Mavericks, Minnesota Timberwolves, Los Angeles Lakers), heart disease.
- Didargylyç Urazow, 39, Turkmen footballer, stroke.
- Bryan Wiedmeier, 56, American sports executive (Miami Dolphins, Cleveland Browns, NFL Management Council), brain cancer.
- Rod Zimmer, 73, Canadian politician, Senator for Manitoba (2005–2013), complications from esophageal cancer and pneumonia.

=== 8 ===
- Smart Akraka, 82, Nigerian Olympic sprinter.
- Ted Atkinson, 95, Australian rules footballer (North Melbourne).
- Pierre Aubert, 89, Swiss politician, President (1983, 1987).
- Terje Fjærn, 73, Norwegian musician and conductor.
- Sascha Lewandowski, 44, German football manager (Bayer Leverkusen, Union Berlin).
- Qahhor Mahkamov, 84, Tajik politician, President (1990–1991).
- Philip Majerus, 79, American biochemist, prostate cancer.
- Marina Malfatti, 83, Italian actress (The Night Evelyn Came Out of the Grave, The Red Queen Kills Seven Times, Black Killer).
- Michael Manser, 87, British architect, complications from a stroke.
- Ngala Mwendwa, 94, Kenyan politician.
- William Smith, 62, Northern Irish paramilitary and politician.
- Robert Sussman, 74, American anthropologist, stroke.

=== 9 ===
- Hamza Ali, 20, English cricketer (Hampshire), drowning.
- Michael Baldasaro, 67, Canadian sect leader (Church of the Universe) and political candidate (Marijuana Party), cancer.
- Stepan Bondarev, 93, Belarusian Soviet army general.
- Alex Tamba Brima, 44, Sierra Leonean military commander (Armed Forces Revolutionary Council), convicted of war crimes and crimes against humanity during the Civil War.
- Stéphane Dumas, 46, Canadian astrophysicist, complications from influenza.
- Carillo Gritti, 74, Italian-born Brazilian Roman Catholic prelate, Territorial Prelate of Itacoatiara (since 2000).
- T. S. John, 76, Indian politician, chairman of the Kerala Congress.
- J. Reilly Lewis, 71, American choral conductor and Baroque music specialist, heart attack.
- James Lewis, 85, American politician, member of the Indiana Senate (1974–1978, 1986–2010) and House of Representatives (1970–1972).
- Hassan Muhammad Makki, 82, Yemeni politician, Prime Minister (1974).
- Panagiotis Mavrikos, 42, Greek newspaper publisher, traffic collision.
- Jim Plyler, 91, American football player.
- Bernard Shrimsley, 85, British newspaper editor (The Sun, News of the World).
- Brooks Thompson, 45, American basketball player (Orlando Magic) and coach (UTSA Roadrunners), multiple organ failure.
- A. Gordon Wetmore, 84, American theologian, President of the Northwest Nazarene College (1983–1992).
- Madeleen de Wijkerslooth de Weerdesteyn, 80, Dutch politician, member of the Senate (1980–1987) and Council of State (1987–2002).
- John Giffen Weinmann, 87, American diplomat.

=== 10 ===
- Shuaibu Amodu, 58, Nigerian football coach (Nigeria national football team).
- Robert C. Beckham, 81, American politician.
- Ángel Cuetos, 79, Spanish Olympic wrestler.
- Mary Feik, 92, American aviator.
- Alexander Gorlov, 85, Russian mechanical engineer.
- Alex Govan, 86, Scottish footballer (Plymouth Argyle, Birmingham City).
- Christina Grimmie, 22, American singer-songwriter (Find Me) and talent show participant (The Voice), shot.
- Gopal Gurung, 80, Nepali politician and author.
- Habib, 68, Iranian singer, heart attack.
- Margaret Vinci Heldt, 98, American hairstylist, creator of the beehive hairstyle.
- Ambrose Hickey, 71, Irish Gaelic footballer (Offaly GAA).
- Desmond Heeley, 85, British set and costume designer.
- John Horgan, 66, Irish hurler (Cork).
- Gordie Howe, 88, Canadian Hall of Fame ice hockey player (Detroit Red Wings, Hartford Whalers).
- Giannis Michalopoulos, 89, Greek actor.
- Ronald Nabakowski, 74, American politician, complications from amyotrophic lateral sclerosis.
- Mimmo Palmara, 87, Italian actor (A Long Ride from Hell, Hercules and the Conquest of Atlantis, Hercules Unchained).
- Alfred Oftedal Telhaug, 81, Norwegian educationalist.
- Giuseppe Virgili, 80, Italian footballer (Fiorentina, national team).
- Derek Wilson, 93, New Zealand architect and environmentalist.

=== 11 ===
- Rudi Altig, 79, German cyclist, winner of the 1962 Vuelta a España, world champion (1966), cancer.
- Asghar Bichareh, 89, Iranian photographer and actor.
- Gilbert Blue, 82, American Catawba chief (1973–2007), mesothelioma.
- Stacey Castor, 48, American convicted murderer, heart attack.
- Chico Fernández, 84, Cuban baseball player (Detroit Tigers), complications from a stroke.
- Paolo Leon, 81, Italian post-Keynesian economist.
- Inder Malhotra, 86, Indian journalist (The Guardian), editor (The Statesman, The Times of India) and columnist.
- Moonist, 5, American racehorse, complications of colic.
- Alberto Remedios, 81, British operatic tenor.
- Bryan Robinson, 41, American football player (Chicago Bears, Cincinnati Bengals, Arizona Cardinals), heart disease.
- Trudi Roth, 86, Swiss actress, dementia.
- Thomas Skidmore, 83, American historian.
- Lars Skytøen, 86, Norwegian politician, Minister of Industry (1979–1981).
- Veijo Valtonen, 80, Finnish footballer.

=== 12 ===
- Abdullah Ahmad, 79, Malaysian newspaper editor (New Straits Times), journalist and politician, cancer.
- Georgia Apostolou, 43, Greek actress (Erotas), heart attack.
- David K. Backus, 63, American economist, leukemia.
- Charles Briles, 70, American actor (The Big Valley), heart failure.
- Donald Carr, 89, English cricketer (Derbyshire, Oxford University, national team) and administrator (MCC, TCCB).
- Michelle Cliff, 69, Jamaican-born American writer, liver failure.
- Gordon Connell, 93, American actor (Hello, Dolly!).
- Vladimir Dolgopolov, 54, Soviet and Russian football player (FC Zenit Saint Petersburg), complications from a stroke.
- Robert F. Dorr, 76, American writer and diplomat, brain tumor.
- Franco Faggi, 90, Italian rower, Olympic gold medalist (1948).
- Earl Faison, 77, American football player (San Diego Chargers).
- Dagfinn Gedde-Dahl, 79, Norwegian physician.
- Dana Giacchetto, 53, American stockbroker and convicted fraudster.
- Gunnar Gran, 84, Norwegian media executive (NRK).
- P. V. Guharaj, 91, Indian police surgeon.
- Curley Johnson, 80, American football player (New York Jets), Super Bowl winner (1969).
- Danny Kopec, 62, American chess player, pancreatic cancer.
- Harold La Borde, 82, Trinidadian sailor, fall.
- Achyut Lahkar, 85, Indian actor and playwright.
- Rodney Leach, Baron Leach of Fairford, 82, British banker and politician.
- Tom Leppard, 80, British tattooed man.
- Omar Mateen, 29, American mass murderer (Orlando nightclub shooting), shot.
- Michu Meszaros, 76, Hungarian-born American actor (ALF).
- Elín Ortiz, 81, Puerto Rican actor, comedian, and producer, Alzheimer's disease.
- Fabrizio Pirovano, 56, Italian motorcycle road racer, tumour.
- Alfonso Portugal, 82, Mexican footballer (national team).
- Jerry Vaflor, 76, Filipino football player and coach, pneumonia.
- George Voinovich, 79, American politician, Senator from Ohio (1999–2011), Governor of Ohio (1991–1998), Mayor of Cleveland (1980–1989).
- Janet Waldo, 96, American actress and voice artist (The Jetsons, The Flintstones, Wacky Races).
- Chris Warren, 49, American musician (WWF).
- Cezary Wodziński, 57, Polish philosopher, historian, essayist and translator (Jagiellonian University, University of Warsaw).

=== 13 ===
- Anahid Ajemian, 92, American violinist.
- Uriah Asante, 24, Ghanaian footballer (Hearts of Oak), heart attack.
- John Arnold Baker, 90, British judge and politician.
- Irene Bauer, 71, Norwegian politician.
- Tony Byrne, 70, Irish footballer (Hereford, Southampton).
- Tet Garcia, 75, Filipino politician.
- Gladys Gunzer, 76, American sculptor.
- Ofelya Hambardzumyan, 91, Armenian folk singer.
- Oleg Karavaychuk, 88, Soviet and Russian composer.
- Joshua Wanume Kibedi, 74, Ugandan diplomat and politician, Foreign Minister (1971–1973), Ambassador to the United Nations (1986–1988).
- Randy Jones, 72, British-born American jazz musician (Chet Baker, Dave Brubeck, Maynard Ferguson), heart failure.
- Ron Mason, 76, Canadian ice hockey coach and university administrator (Michigan State).
- Mohammad Moniruzzaman Miah, 81, Bangladeshi academic.
- Chips Moman, 79, American songwriter ("(Hey Won't You Play) Another Somebody Done Somebody Wrong Song") and record producer, Grammy winner (1976).
- Mudrarakshas, 82, Indian Hindi author.
- Robert T. Paine, 83, American ecologist, acute myeloid leukemia.
- Gregory Rabassa, 94, American literary translator (Hopscotch).
- Gerald J. Wasserburg, 89, American geologist.

=== 14 ===
- Lidia Biondi, 75, Italian actress (Eat Pray Love, Casanova, Rome).
- Roger Breeze, 69, English veterinary scientist.
- Robert Després, 91, Canadian businessman, lung cancer.
- Anatol Dumitraș, 60, Moldovan singer, cancer.
- Melvin Dwork, 94, American interior designer and gay rights activist.
- Ronnie Claire Edwards, 83, American actress (The Waltons, The Dead Pool, Designing Women), chronic obstructive pulmonary disease.
- Fanchon Fröhlich, 88, American artist.
- Anatoli Grishin, 76, Russian sprint canoeist, Olympic champion (1964).
- Ann Morgan Guilbert, 87, American actress (The Dick Van Dyke Show, The Nanny, Grumpier Old Men), pancreatic cancer.
- Per Hovdenakk, 80, Norwegian art historian.
- OJB Jezreel, 49, Nigerian singer and record producer, complications from kidney failure.
- Gertrude Kerbis, 89, American architect (O'Hare International Airport), liver cancer.
- Pamela Kurrell, 77, American Olympic discus thrower.
- Gilles Lamontagne, 97, Canadian politician, Lieutenant Governor of Quebec (1984–1990), MP (1977–1984), Mayor of Quebec City (1965–1977).
- Ali Lazrak, 68, Dutch politician, member of the House of Representatives (2002–2006), lung cancer.
- Henry McCullough, 72, Northern Irish guitarist (Spooky Tooth, Wings, The Grease Band).
- Samuel Mumbengegwi, 73, Zimbabwean politician.
- Ken Orr, 77, American software engineer.
- Irma Roy, 84, Argentine actress and politician, national deputy (1995–2005).
- Ovie Scurlock, 97, American jockey.
- Yumi Shirakawa, 79, Japanese actress (Rodan, The Mysterians, The H-Man).

=== 15 ===
- Somawansa Amarasinghe, 73, Sri Lankan politician, leader of Janatha Vimukthi Peramuna (1994–2014), stroke.
- Anton Barten, 86, Dutch economist.
- Nicholas Clinch, 85, American mountaineer and lawyer.
- Claude Confortès, 88, French actor (War of the Buttons).
- Lois Duncan, 82, American author (I Know What You Did Last Summer, Hotel for Dogs, Who Killed My Daughter?).
- Aslam Farrukhi, 92, Pakistani writer and critic.
- Gypsy Joe, 82, Puerto Rican professional wrestler (WWC, CWA, AJPW).
- David Hall, 88, New Zealand chemistry academic (University of Auckland).
- Roland Hardy, 90, British Olympic race walker (1952, 1956).
- Bob Holman, 79, British academic (University of Bath) and community worker, motor neurone disease.
- Joaquin Jackson, 80, American Texas Ranger.
- Fred James, 71, Canadian football player (Calgary Stampeders).
- Ladislav Kupkovič, 80, Slovak composer and conductor.
- Richard O. Linke, 98, American television producer (The Andy Griffith Show, Mayberry R.F.D., The Jim Nabors Hour).
- Milorad Mandić, 55, Serbian actor (Selo gori, a baba se češlja, Pretty Village, Pretty Flame, Klopka), heart attack.
- Hiroshi Minatoya, 72, Japanese judoka, world champion (1967, 1969).
- Alavi Moulana, 84, Sri Lankan politician, Minister of Labour (2000–2001), Governor of Western Province (2002–2015).
- Harry Moule, 94, English cricketer (Worcestershire).
- Richard Selzer, 87, American surgeon and author.
- Giuseppe Spagnulo, 79, Italian sculptor.
- A. C. Tirulokchandar, 86, Indian film director (Iru Malargal, Deiva Magan, Adhey Kangal).
- John Tremelling, 86, Australian Olympic sports shooter.
- Elaina Marie Tuttle, 52, ornithologist and behavioral geneticist

=== 16 ===
- Sulo Aittoniemi, 79, Finnish politician, MP (1987–2003).
- Bill Berkson, 76, American poet and art critic, heart attack.
- Doug Cherry, 83, Canadian politician.
- Jo Cox, 41, British politician, MP for Batley and Spen (since 2015), shot and stabbed.
- Manimala Devi, 84, Indian actress (Kaa).
- Wayne Dowd, 74, American politician, member of the Arkansas Senate (1978–2000), cancer.
- Anjan Dutta, 64, Indian politician.
- Rolland V. Heiser, 91, American lieutenant general.
- Hans Lipschis, 96, Lithuanian-born German military officer.
- Luděk Macela, 65, Czech footballer, Olympic gold medalist (1980).
- Irving Moskowitz, 88, American businessman and philanthropist.
- Candy Ruff, 65, American politician, member of the Kansas House of Representatives (1993–2009).
- Bernard Skinner, 85, Canadian Olympic sailor.
- Pat Suggate, 94, British-born New Zealand geologist.
- Jerome Teasley, 67, American drummer, complications from liver and lung cancer.
- Charles Thompson, 98, American pianist.
- Marilyn Wood, 86–87, American choreographer.

=== 17 ===
- Rubén Aguirre, 82, Mexican actor (El Chavo del Ocho, El Chapulín Colorado, Chespirito).
- Willy Andresen, 94, Norwegian jazz pianist.
- Teng Bunma, 74–75, Cambodian businessman, complications from diabetes and high blood pressure.
- Attrell Cordes, 46, American rhythm and blues singer (P.M. Dawn), renal disease.
- Angel Gelmi Bertocchi, 78, Italian-born Bolivian Roman Catholic prelate, Auxiliary Bishop of Cochabamba (1985–2013).
- Audrey Disbury, 82, English cricketer.
- Peter Feuchtwanger, 76, German-born British pianist, composer and piano teacher.
- Thomas Ashley Graves Jr., 91, American academic, President of the College of William & Mary (1971–1985).
- Bud Gregory, 90, Canadian politician.
- Phil Hennigan, 70, American baseball player (Cleveland Indians, New York Mets), lung cancer.
- Sam Beaver King, 90, Jamaican-born British political activist, Mayor of Southwark (1983), co-founder of the Notting Hill Carnival.
- Reidar Kvaal, 100, Norwegian World War II military officer.
- Ron Lester, 45, American actor (Varsity Blues, Popular, Good Burger), liver and kidney failure.
- David Morgenthaler, 96, American businessman.
- Loretto Petrucci, 86, Italian racing cyclist.
- Corinne Philpott, 62, Northern Irish judge.
- Tenor Fly, 48, English rapper and ragga vocalist.
- Wang Sichao, 77, Chinese astronomy scholar, cerebral hemorrhage.

=== 18 ===
- Paul Cox, 76, Dutch-born Australian film director (My First Wife, A Woman's Tale, Exile), liver cancer.
- Sharon Douglas, 95, American actress (Fog Island).
- Susana Duijm, 79, Venezuelan beauty queen, Miss World winner (1955).
- Alejandro Jano Fuentes, 45, American singer (La Voz... México), shot.
- Graham Gibbons, 96, Bermudian businessman and politician, Mayor of Hamilton, Bermuda (1972–1988).
- Jim Harrison, 80, American writer and artist, heart attack.
- Curt Hofstad, 70, American politician, member of the North Dakota House of Representatives (since 2006), heart attack.
- Väinö Huhtala, 80, Finnish cross-country skier, Olympic champion (1960).
- Jeppiaar, 85, Indian educationist, founder and chancellor of Sathyabama University.
- Sverre Kjelsberg, 69, Norwegian musician (The Pussycats).
- William J. Livsey, 85, American army general.
- Sibe Mardešić, 89, Croatian mathematician.
- Rachel McCulloch, 74, American economist.
- Vittorio Merloni, 83, Italian entrepreneur and industrialist, founder of Indesit.
- Robert L. Moore, 73, American psychologist.
- Kitty Rhoades, 65, American politician, member of the Wisconsin State Assembly (1999–2011), pneumonia.
- Stanisław Romik, 90, Polish shooter.
- Joe Schaffernoth, 78, American baseball player (Chicago Cubs, Cleveland Indians), cancer.
- Edith Turner, 95, English-born American anthropologist.
- Wu Jianmin, 77, Chinese diplomat, Ambassador to France and the Netherlands (1998–2003), traffic collision.

=== 19 ===
- Mihnea Berindei, 68, Romanian-born French historian.
- Nicolae Bocșan, 68, Romanian historian.
- Michael Brewster, 69, American artist.
- Laurie Evans, 82, Canadian politician.
- Nicolás García Uriburu, 78, Argentine artist and landscape architect.
- Götz George, 77, German actor (Tatort).
- Fan Ho, 84, Chinese photographer, film director and actor, pneumonia.
- David Johnson, 83, Australian-born American business executive (Campbell's).
- John Love, 73, British-born Australian scientist.
- Marjorie Lynn, 94, American singer.
- Ricardo Obregón Cano, 99, Argentine politician, Governor of Córdoba (1973–1974).
- Allan Paivio, 91, Canadian psychologist.
- Ixora Rojas Paz, 60, Venezuelan lawyer and politician, president of the Chamber of Deputies (1998–1999).
- Alan Saville, 69, British archaeologist and museum curator, cancer.
- Victor Stănculescu, 88, Romanian general and politician, Minister of National Defence.
- Norbert Thériault, 95, Canadian politician, MLA (1960–1979) and Senator for New Brunswick (1979–1996).
- Niki Tobi, 75, Nigerian judge, Associate Justice of the Supreme Court (2002–2010).
- Randolph Vigne, 87, South African political activist.
- Anton Yelchin, 27, Soviet-born American actor (Star Trek, Alpha Dog, Fright Night), blunt traumatic asphyxia.

=== 20 ===
- Ann Atwater, 80, American civil rights activist.
- Frank Chapot, 84, American equestrian, Olympic silver medalist (1960, 1972).
- Fiqre Crockwell, 30, Bermudian cricket player, shot.
- Eamonn Dolan, 48, Irish football player and coach, cancer.
- Alvin Endt, 82, American politician, member of the Mississippi House of Representatives (1984–1999).
- Alan Epstein, 66, American author.
- Benoîte Groult, 96, French journalist, writer and feminist activist.
- Bill Ham, 79, American band manager (ZZ Top).
- Barry Hanson, 72, British film producer (The Long Good Friday).
- Goro Hasegawa, 83, Japanese board game designer.
- Hal Holman, 93, Australian artist.
- Michał Józefczyk, 69, Polish Roman Catholic priest.
- Aulis Kähkönen, 85, Finnish Olympic swimmer.
- Helen S. Lang, 69, American philosopher, brain cancer.
- Willie Logie, 83, Scottish footballer (Rangers).
- Ernesto Maceda, 81, Filipino politician, Senate President (1996–1998), Senator (1971–1972, 1987–1998) and columnist, multiple organ failure.
- Dan Maraya, 69, Nigerian griot.
- Rich Olive, 66, American politician, member of the Iowa Senate (2007–2011), cancer.
- Edgard Pisani, 97, French politician, philosopher and writer, President of the AWI (1988–1995), High Commissioner of New Caledonia (1985), Minister of Agriculture (1961–1966).
- William Craig Rice, 61, American academic.
- Chayito Valdez, 71, Mexican-born American folk singer and actress, complications from a cerebral hemorrhage.
- James Victor, 76, American actor (Stand and Deliver, Zorro).

=== 21 ===
- Guda Anjaiah, 60, Indian poet, singer and lyricist, kidney ailment.
- Jim Boyd, 60, American singer-songwriter.
- Karl Dallas, 85, British journalist, author and campaigner, cancer.
- Dan Daniel, 82, American radio personality (WMCA, WYNY, WCBS).
- Bryan Edwards, 85, British footballer (Bolton Wanderers).
- Helen T. Edwards, 80, American physicist.
- Pat Friday, 94, American singer.
- Jack Fuller, 69, American journalist and publisher (Tribune Publishing), cancer.
- Kunio Hatoyama, 67, Japanese politician.
- Henk Hofland, 88, Dutch journalist, columnist and writer.
- Al Howie, 70, Canadian long-distance runner.
- Wayne Jackson, 74, American musician (The Mar-Keys, The Memphis Horns), heart failure.
- Shem Kellogg, 34, American politician.
- Pierre Lalonde, 75, Canadian singer and television host, complications from Parkinson's disease.
- Roger Margerum, 86, American architect, complications from a stroke.
- Kenworth Moffett, 81, American art curator (Boston Museum of Fine Arts), museum director (Museum of Art Fort Lauderdale) and writer.
- Mohammed Nizamuddin, 83, Indian trade unionist and politician.
- Jim Randell, 87, Australian politician, member of the Queensland Legislative Assembly for Mirani (1980–1994).

=== 22 ===
- Joan Acker, 92, American sociologist.
- John William Ashe, 61, Antiguan diplomat, President of the United Nations General Assembly (2013–2014), heart attack.
- Vasily Bochkaryov, 67, Russian politician.
- Steve French, 56, American gospel singer (Kingdom Heirs), suicide by jumping.
- John Garrow, 87, British nutritionist and physician.
- Luis Gutiérrez Martín, 84, Spanish Roman Catholic prelate, Bishop of Segovia (1995–2007).
- Mike Hart, 72, British singer-songwriter.
- David J. Hickson, 85, British organisational theorist.
- Mohammad Kilani, Jordanian politician, Water Minister (1989).
- Andrzej Kondratiuk, 79, Polish film director (Hydrozagadka), screenwriter, actor and cinematographer.
- Roberto Lovera, 93, Uruguayan basketball player, Olympic bronze medalist (1952).
- Melânia Luz, 88, Brazilian Olympic sprinter.
- Alan Mitchell, 55, English comic book writer.
- J. V. Ramana Murthi, 83, Indian actor.
- Yaşar Nuri Öztürk, 71, Turkish theologian and politician, stomach cancer.
- William Patrick, 84, Canadian Olympic diver.
- Harry Rabinowitz, 100, British film composer (Reilly, Ace of Spies) and conductor (Chariots of Fire, Cats).
- Samir Roychoudhury, 82, Indian writer (Hungry Generation).
- Tokia Russell, 38, Bermudian footballer, traffic collision.
- Amjad Sabri, 45, Pakistani qawwali singer, shot.

=== 23 ===
- Eoin Cameron, 65, Australian radio presenter (ABC Radio Perth) and politician, MP for Stirling (1993–1998), heart attack.
- Earle M. Chiles, 83, American businessman and philanthropist.
- Mike Flynn, 48, American online journalist and conservative activist.
- Arie Gluck, 86, Israeli Olympic runner (1952).
- James Green, 71, American historian, leukemia.
- Michael Herr, 76, American author (Dispatches) and screenwriter (Full Metal Jacket, Apocalypse Now).
- Shirley Fenton Huie, 91, Australian author.
- Jin Yaqin, 91, Chinese actress (You and Me), cancer.
- Shelley Moore, 84, British-born American jazz singer.
- Stanley Mandelstam, 87, American theoretical physicist.
- Peter Morley, 91, German-born British filmmaker.
- Stuart Nisbet, 82, American actor (Casino, In the Heat of the Night, Bewitched).
- Robert Clifford Pelletier, 83, American businessman.
- Ralph Stanley, 89, American bluegrass musician (The Stanley Brothers), Grammy winner (2002), skin cancer.
- Peter Tennant, 74, English cricketer.
- Rane Vaskivuori, 49, Finnish designer.

=== 24 ===
- Dick Bensfield, 90, American television writer (The Adventures of Ozzie and Harriet, Hello, Larry, Mayberry R.F.D.).
- Francisco Ivens de Sá Dias Branco, 81, Brazilian billionaire businessman.
- Charles Chaynes, 90, French composer.
- Robert A. Duin, 91, American rear admiral.
- Tony Feher, 60, American sculptor, liver cancer.
- Asım Can Gündüz, 60, Turkish rock guitarist, heart attack.
- Steven Hancock, 58, British Olympic kayaker (1980) and business executive (VidWrx Inc.), traffic collision.
- Chaim Avrohom Horowitz, 83, American Chasidic rabbi of the Boston Hasidic dynasty.
- Donald Jelinek, 82, American civil rights lawyer, lung disease.
- Allah Dino Khaskheli, 50, Pakistani singer, traffic collision.
- Andries Kinsbergen, 89, Belgian politician, Governor of Antwerp (1967–1993).
- James Lee, 36, American football player (Green Bay Packers), complications from diabetes.
- Kelly Mader, 64, American rancher and politician, heart attack.
- Edoardo Müller, 78, Italian opera conductor.
- Oscar Obert, 85, American handball player.
- Greg Pierce, 66, Australian rugby league player and captain (Cronulla Sharks, national team), cancer.
- Dalma Takács, 83, Hungarian-born author.
- Gerald Walpin, 84, American attorney and author.
- Bernie Worrell, 72, American musician (Parliament-Funkadelic), lung cancer.

=== 25 ===
- Raymond Bateman, 88, American politician, New Jersey state senator (1968–1978).
- Percy Beake, 99, Canadian-born British World War II fighter pilot.
- Benjamin Bistline, 81, American historian.
- Antonin Canavese, 87, French cyclist.
- Nicole Courcel, 84, French actress (Rendezvous in July, Sundays and Cybele).
- Jack Cropp, 89, New Zealand yachtsman, Olympic gold medalist (1956).
- Bill Cunningham, 87, American fashion photographer (The New York Times).
- Maurice G. Dantec, 57, French science fiction writer and musician.
- Giuseppe Ferrara, 83, Italian film director (The Moro Affair, One Hundred Days in Palermo, Giovanni Falcone).
- Steve Ferrughelli, 67, Canadian football player (Montreal Alouettes).
- Shōichi Fujimori, 89, Japanese royal steward.
- Jim Hickman, 79, American baseball player (New York Mets, Chicago Cubs).
- Peter Hutton, 71, American film director, cancer.
- Farrakh Khan, 77, Pakistani army general, Chief of General Staff (1991–1994).
- Chester Krause 92, American author and numismatist, heart failure.
- Hal Lear, 81, American basketball player (Temple University).
- Patrick Mayhew, Baron Mayhew of Twysden, 86, British barrister and politician, Secretary of State for Northern Ireland (1992–1997).
- Mohapatra Nilamani Sahoo, 89, Indian writer, multiple organ failure.
- Ben Patterson, 82, American artist and musician.
- Julie Plawecki, 54, American politician, member of the Michigan House of Representatives (since 2015), heart attack.
- Wolfgang Richter, 89, Brazilian Olympic sailor.
- Adam Small, 79, South African writer and poet, complications from surgery.
- Ermin Smrekar, 85, Italian architect.
- Trevor Steedman, 62, British actor and stuntman (Aliens, Snatch, Children of Men), complications from a stroke.
- Elliot Wolff, 61, American songwriter and music producer. (body discovered on this date)

=== 26 ===
- Jürgen von Beckerath, 96, German Egyptologist.
- Austin Clarke, 81, Canadian novelist (The Polished Hoe).
- Sergei Cortez, 81, Chilean-born Belarusian composer.
- Kristiina Elstelä, 73, Finnish actress.
- Gerhard Gehring, 71, German Olympic skier.
- Jona Goldrich, 88, Polish-born American real estate developer and philanthropist.
- Barbara Goldsmith, 85, American author, heart failure.
- Samuel L. Green Jr., 89, American pastor and bishop (Church of God in Christ).
- Andrés Hernández Ros, 67, Spanish politician, President of the Region of Murcia (1982–1984).
- Henrietta Rach Hoernle, 103, German-born American philanthropist.
- Ryan Jimmo, 34, Canadian mixed martial artist (UFC, MFC), vehicular homicide.
- Kim Sung-min, 43, South Korean actor (Miss Mermaid), suicide by hanging.
- Anatoliy Kutsev, 57, Moldovan-born Ukrainian football player, referee and manager (women's national team).
- Alexander Litaay, 67, Indonesian ambassador, Ambassador to Croatia (since 2016), heart attack.
- Hazel Newhook, 101, Canadian politician, MHA for Gander (1979–1985), Mayor of Gander (1973–1977).
- Kavalam Narayana Panicker, 88, Indian dramatist, theatre director and poet.
- Mike Pedicin, 98, American jazz bandleader.
- William Rohwer, 78, American educational psychologist.
- John J. Santucci, 85, American lawyer and politician, New York state senator (1968–1976).
- Gino Sovran, 91, Canadian basketball player (Toronto Huskies).
- Chineko Sugawara, 77, Japanese actress.
- William C. Waterhouse, 74, American mathematician.
- Rostislav Yankovsky, 86, Belarusian film and stage actor, People's Artist of the USSR (1978).

=== 27 ===
- Franz Cibulka, 69, Austrian composer.
- Adelmar Faria Coimbra-Filho, 92, Brazilian biologist.
- Caçapava, 61, Brazilian footballer.
- Elmer Cravalho, 90, American politician, Speaker of the Hawaii House of Representatives (1959–1967), Mayor of Maui (1969–1979).
- Henry Sebastian D'Souza, 90, Indian Roman Catholic prelate, Archbishop of Calcutta (1986–2002).
- Xerxes Desai, 79, Indian executive (Titan).
- Ronald Falk, 80, Australian actor (Star Wars: Episode II – Attack of the Clones, Jack Irish, Evil Angels).
- Pelle Gudmundsen-Holmgreen, 83, Danish composer, cancer.
- Harry Halbreich, 85, Belgian musicologist.
- Dave Heath, 85, American photographer.
- Dame Grace Hollander, 94, New Zealand community leader.
- Aharon Ipalé, 74, Moroccan-born Israeli actor (The Mummy, Fiddler on the Roof, Alias), cancer.
- Arthur Lavine, 93, American photojournalist, complications from Alzheimer's disease.
- George W. Miller, 75, American federal judge.
- Oh Se-jong, 33, South Korean short track speed skater, Olympic champion (2006), traffic collision.
- Simon Ramo, 103, American engineer, businessman and author.
- Mack Rice, 82, American songwriter ("Mustang Sally", "Respect Yourself") and singer, complications of Alzheimer's disease.
- Edward D. Sheafer Jr., 75, American naval officer.
- Bud Spencer, 86, Italian actor (They Call Me Trinity, Watch Out, We're Mad!, Who Finds a Friend Finds a Treasure) and swimmer.
- Amar Suloev, 40, Armenian mixed martial artist, stomach cancer.
- Alvin Toffler, 87, American writer and futurist (Future Shock, The Third Wave).

=== 28 ===
- Leland Bardwell, 94, Irish poet, novelist and playwright.
- Theo Dilissen, 62, Belgian basketball player and businessman.
- Christer Ericsson, 74, Swedish businessman, drowning.
- Freddie Gilroy, 80, Northern Irish bantamweight boxer, Olympic bronze medalist (1956).
- Allan Greenshields, 90, Australian football player (Carlton, St Kilda).
- André Guelfi, 97, French racing driver (Formula One).
- Darell Koons, 91, American painter.
- George Matsumoto, 93, American architect.
- Joseph Atsumi Misue, 80, Japanese Roman Catholic prelate, Bishop of Hiroshima (1985–2011).
- Scotty Moore, 84, American guitarist (Elvis Presley).
- Fabiane Niclotti, 31, Brazilian model, Miss Universo Brasil 2004.
- Buddy Ryan, 85, American football head coach (Philadelphia Eagles, Arizona Cardinals) and defensive coordinator (Chicago Bears, Houston Oilers).
- Michel Soutif, 94, French physicist.
- Pat Summitt, 64, American basketball coach (Tennessee Lady Volunteers), dementia.
- Zurlon Tipton, 26, American football player (Indianapolis Colts), shot.
- Keith Vickerman, 83, British zoologist (University of Glasgow), Regius Professor of Zoology (1984–1998).

=== 29 ===
- Elechi Amadi, 82, Nigerian writer.
- Margaret Bakkes, 84, South African author.
- Inocente Carreño, 96, Venezuelan composer.
- James Cooley, 89, American mathematician.
- Giuseppe De Andrea, 86, Italian-born American Roman Catholic prelate, Apostolic Nuncio to Bahrain, Kuwait, and Yemen (2001–2005), Qatar (2003–2005).
- John Farquharson, 86, Australian journalist.
- Gunnar Garbo, 92, Norwegian politician, MP (1958–1973).
- Stanley Gault, 90, American businessman, CEO of Rubbermaid and Goodyear.
- Robert Marie Gay, 89, Canadian-born Ugandan Roman Catholic prelate, Bishop of Kabale (1996–2003).
- Irving Gottesman, 85, American psychologist.
- Holsey G. Handyside, 88, American diplomat.
- Carl Haas, 86, American car racing team owner.
- Stan Harper, 94, American virtuoso harmonica player.
- Jan Hettema, 82, South African Olympic cyclist (1956) and rally driver, shot.
- Ojo Maduekwe, 71, Nigerian politician, Minister of Foreign Affairs (2007–2010).
- Frode Nilsen, 92, Norwegian diplomat.
- Veena Sahasrabuddhe, 67, Indian singer and composer.
- Edward L. Salmon Jr., 82, American Episcopal prelate, Bishop of South Carolina (1990–2008).
- Douglas W. Schwartz, 86, American archaeologist.
- Vasyl Slipak, 41, Ukrainian opera singer, shot.
- K. G. Subramanyan, 92, Indian artist.
- Arthur Underwood, 88, English cricketer.
- Rob Wasserman, 64, American musician (David Grisman Quintet, RatDog, Lou Reed), cancer.
- Xu Jiatun, 100, Chinese politician and dissident, Governor of Jiangsu (1977–1979).

=== 30 ===
- Charlie Akers, 76, American Olympic biathlete.
- Ann Cartwright DeCouto, 75, Bermudian politician, Deputy Premier (1989–1992).
- Don Friedman, 81, American jazz pianist.
- Paul T. Gillcrist, 87, American rear admiral.
- Gian Corrado Gross, 74, Italian Olympic swimmer (1964).
- Juan Habichuela, 83, Spanish flamenco guitarist.
- Sir Geoffrey Hill, 84, British poet.
- Quasar Khanh, 82, Vietnamese inventor and designer.
- Al Libous, 88, American politician, Mayor of Binghamton, New York (1969–1981).
- Tupay Loong, 69, Filipino politician, Governor of Sulu (1984–1996), liver cancer.
- Martin Lundström, 98, Swedish cross-country skier, Olympic champion (1948).
- Gordon Murray, 95, British puppeteer and television producer (Trumpton, Camberwick Green, Chigley).
- Don Parmley, 82, American bluegrass musician.
- Joe Scott, 90, American football player (New York Giants).
- Robert Squires, 89, British vice admiral.
- Thunder, 34, Australian professional wrestler (CMLL), stomach cancer.
- Witold Zagórski, 85, Polish basketball player (national team) and coach.
