= Elena Ostrovskaya =

Australian-Russian physicist

- Education: Moscow State University (M.S.c); Australian National University (Ph.D.)
- Scientific career
- Fields: Physics
- Workplaces: Australian National University
- Thesis: Optical vector solitons (1999)
- Website: https://polaritonbec.org/

Dr. Elena A. Ostrovskaya (Russian: Елена Авинировна Островская) is a professor at the Research School of Physics at Australian National University (ANU), where she leads the Polariton BEC (Bose-Einstein condensate) Research Group; she is also a founding member of the editorial board of AIP Publishing's AVS Quantum Science.

== Academic Career ==
Ostrovskaya graduated from Moscow State University's Physics Department in 1993 and completed her PhD through the Australian National University in 1999.

Her primary research interests are exciton-polaritons in semiconductor microcavities, the Bose-Einstein condensates of ultracold atoms as well as non-linear optics, photonics and dynamics. She has also been involved in numerous grants including as being the chief investigator or ARC Centre of Excellence in Future Low-Energy Electronics Technologies which ran between 2017 and 2023.

== Selected publications ==
- Ostrovskaya, Elena A. (March 10, 1999) [research undertaken between June 1995 and March 1999]. Optical Vector Solitons (PhD thesis). The research was conducted under the supervision of Dr. N. N. Akhmediev, Dr. Yu. S. Kivshar, and Prof. J. D. Love. Canberra: Optical Sciences Centre, Research School of Physical Sciences and Engineering, Australian National University. doi:10.25911/5d67b4f714774. hdl:1885/144731. OCLC 1441743957.
- Kivshar, Yu. S.; Ostrovskaya, E. A. (2000). "Multi-Soliton Transmission and Pulse Shepherding in Bit-Parallel WDM Optical Fiber Systems". In Hasegawa, Akira (ed.). Massive WDM and TDM Soliton Transmission Systems: A ROSC Symposium. Solid-State Science and Technology Library (SSST), vol. 6. Dordrecht: Springer Netherlands. pp. 41–61. doi:10.1007/0-306-47125-6_3. ISBN 978-0-306-47125-4. ISSN 1383-7141.
- Weilnau, Carsten; Denz, Cornelia; Krolikowski, Wieslaw; Geisser, Matthias; McCarthy, Glen; Luther-Davies, Barry; Ostrovskaya, Elena A.; Kivshar, Yuri S. (2001). "Observation of Dipole-Mode Vector Solitons". In Boardman, A. D.; Sukhorukov, A. P. (eds.). Soliton-driven Photonics. NATO Science Series II: Mathematics, Physics and Chemistry (NAII), vol. 31. Dordrecht: Springer Netherlands. pp. 229–234. doi:10.1007/978-94-010-0682-8_23. ISBN 978-94-010-0682-8. ISSN 1568-2609.
- Ostrovskaya, E. A.; Oberthaler, M. K.; Kivshar, Y. S. (2008). "Nonlinear Localization of BECs in Optical Lattices". In Kevrekidis, Panayotis G.; Frantzeskakis, Dimitri J.; Carretero-González, Ricardo (eds.). Emergent Nonlinear Phenomena in Bose-Einstein Condensates: Theory and Experiment. Springer Series on Atomic, Optical, and Plasma Physics (SSAOPP), vol. 45. Berlin, Heidelberg: Springer Berlin Heidelberg. pp. 99–130. doi:10.1007/978-3-540-73591-5_6. eISSN 2197-6791. ISBN 978-3-540-73590-8. ISSN 1615-5653.
