= Robert Beckham =

Robert Beckham may refer to:

- Robert Franklin Beckham (1837–1864), Confederate States Army officer
- Robert C. Beckham (1932–2016), American politician, member of the Georgia House of Representatives
- Bob Beckham (Robert Joseph Beckham, 1927–2013), American country music publisher
