= Bernard Skinner =

Bernard Skinner may refer to:

- Bernard Skinner (sailor)
- Bernard Skinner (entomologist)
