= Helen Lang =

Helen Lang may refer to:

- Helen S. Lang (1947–2016), American philosopher
- Helen Lang, a character in the 1950 American comedy film The Big Hangover played by Anna Q. Nilsson
- Helen Lang, a character a 1989 Australian mini series Bodysurfer played by Melissa Marshall
