= Valtanen =

Surname list

Valtanen is a Finnish surname. Notable people with the surname include:

- Jaakko Valtanen (1925–2024), Finnish general
- Juha Valtanen (born 1952), Finnish sailor

== See also ==
- Valtonen
