= Winter Kill =

1974 television film directed by Jud Taylor

- Genre: Mystery; Thriller
- Teleplay by: John Michael Hayes
- Story by: David Karp
- Directed by: Jud Taylor
- Starring: Andy Griffith; John Larch; Tim O'Connor; Lawrence Pressman; Eugene Roche; Charles Tyner; Joyce Van Patten; Nick Nolte
- Music by: Jerry Goldsmith
- Country of origin: United States
- Original language: English

Production
- Executive producer: Richard O. Linke
- Producer: Burt Nodella
- Production locations: Big Bear Valley, San Bernardino National Forest; Snow Valley, California
- Cinematography: Frank Stanley
- Editor: Henry Berman
- Running time: 94 minutes
- Production companies: Andy Griffith Enterprises; MGM Television

Original release
- Network: ABC
- Release: April 15, 1974

Winter Kill is a 1974 American made-for-television mystery-thriller film directed by Jud Taylor and written by John Michael Hayes and David Karp. It stars Andy Griffith as Sam McNeill, the police chief in a small resort town in the mountains of northern California. The film is mystery-suspense drama about McNeill's attempts to solve a string of local serial killings linked by messages left at the scenes of the crimes. Nick Nolte played the role of Dave Michaels.

The movie (which aired on April 15, 1974 as an ABC Movie of the Week) was the second attempt by writer/producer Lane Slate to adapt the 1972 movie They Only Kill Their Masters into a TV series. The movie starred James Garner as Abel Marsh, a Police Chief in a small, beachside community.

The first adaptation attempt was 1973's Isn't It Shocking?, starring Alan Alda as police chief Dan Barnes and the setting relocated to Oregon. Next, Griffith stepped in as the now-renamed Sam McNeill (Andy Griffith) in Winter Kill and then again in 1975 with two episodes of Adams of Eagle Lake (this time, the character was renamed Sam Adams). Two more reworkings followed in 1976 and 1977 starring Griffith, with the character's name restored to Abel Marsh: The Girl in the Empty Grave and Deadly Game.
