= Stuart Anderson =

Stuart Anderson may refer to:

- Stuart Anderson (Australian footballer) (born 1974), Australian rules footballer
- Stuart Anderson (Scottish footballer) (born 1986), Scottish footballer
- Stuart Anderson (American football) (born 1959), former American football linebacker
- Stuart Anderson (politician) (born 1976), British MP elected 2019
- Stuart Anderson (restaurateur) (1922–2016), American restaurateur
- Stewart Anderson (footballer) (1910–1962), Australian rules footballer
- Stewart Anderson (bowls) (born 1985), Scottish bowls player

== See also ==
- John Stuart Anderson (1908–1990), scientist
