= Mavrikos =

Mavrikos (Greek: Μαυρίκου) is a Greek surname. Notable people with the surname include:

- George Mavrikos (born 1950), Greek trade unionist
- Panagiotis Mavrikos (1974–2016), Greek newspaper publisher
