= Valtonen =

Valtonen is a Finnish surname. Notable people with the surname include:

- Elias Valtonen (born 1999), Finnish basketball player
- Elina Valtonen (born 1981), Finnish politician
- Jarmo Valtonen (born 1982), Finnish speed skater
- Jonne Valtonen (born 1976), Finnish composer
- Jorma Valtonen (born 1946), Finnish ice hockey player
- Jorma Valtonen (athlete) (1923–2001), Finnish athlete
- Kari Valtonen (born 1954), Finnish chess problemist
- Mato Valtonen (born 1955), Finnish actor and musician
- Mauri Valtonen (born 1945), Finnish astronomer
- Osmo Valtonen (1929–2002), Finnish artist and sculptor
- Tomek Valtonen (born 1980), Finnish ice hockey player
- Veijo Valtonen (1936–2016), Finnish footballer
