= Madeleen de Wijkerslooth de Weerdesteyn =

Dutch politician

Jonkvrouw Madeleen Leyten-de Wijkerslooth de Weerdesteyn
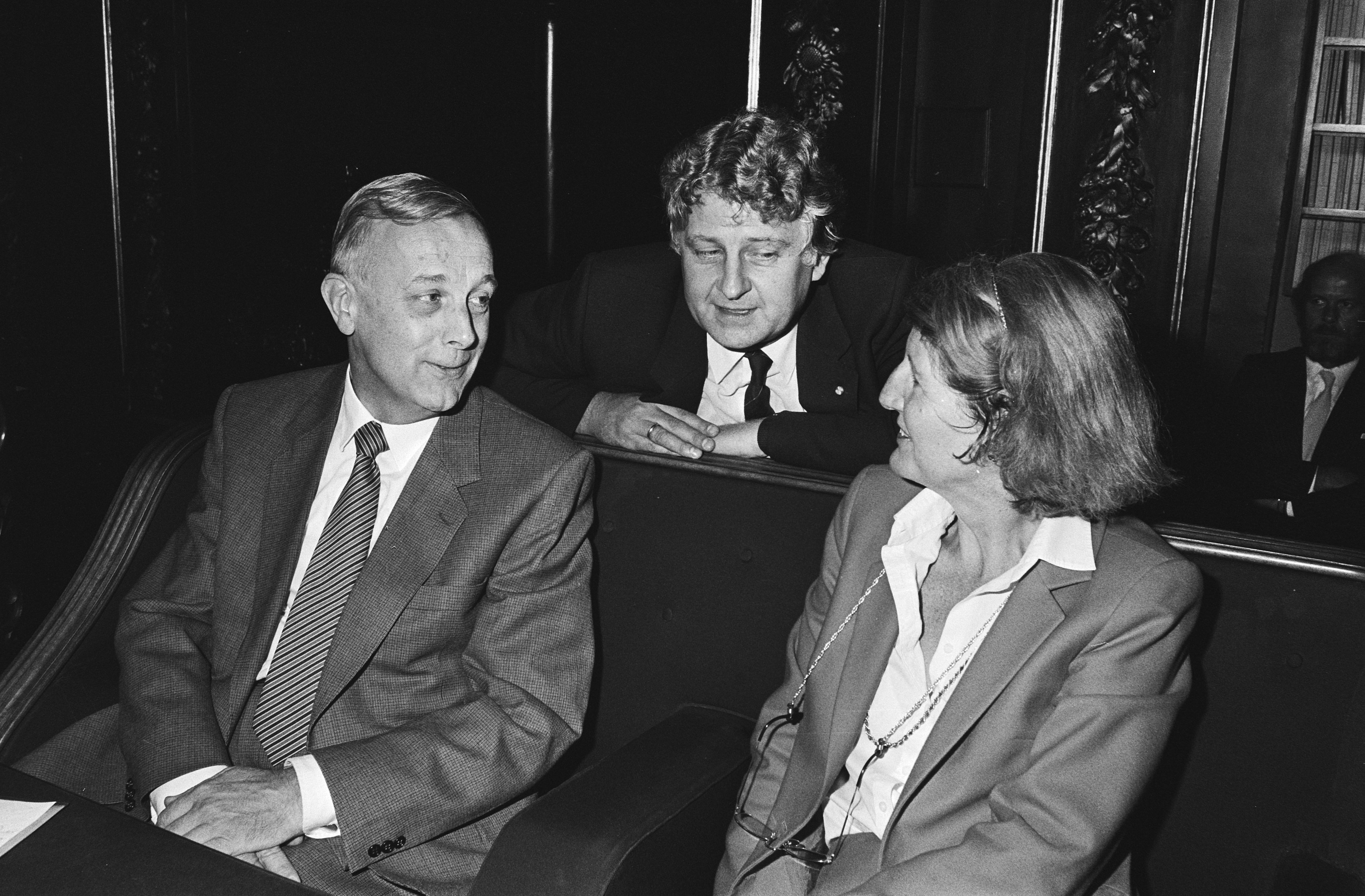
- Madeleen Leyten-de Wijkerslooth de Weerdesteyn (right) in 1983, with Piet Bukman (center) and Piet Steenkamp (left)

Member of the Senate
- In office 16 September 1980 – 1 October 1987

Personal details
- Born: Judith Juliëtte Madeleine Sophie de Wijkerslooth de Weerdesteyn; 29 September 1935 Zwolle, Netherlands
- Died: 9 June 2016 (aged 80) The Hague, Netherlands
- Party: Catholic People's Party (1959–1980); Christian Democratic Appeal (1980–2016)
- Spouse: Ton Leyten (m. 1966–2016)

Jkvr. Judith Juliëtte Madeleine Sophie "Madeleen" Leyten-de Wijkerslooth de Weerdesteyn (29 September 1935 – 9 June 2016) was a Dutch politician.

She was born in Zwolle and joined the Catholic People's Party (KVP) in 1959. For this party she was member of the States of North Brabant between 1970 and 1978. The KVP was absorbed by Christian Democratic Appeal in 1980. She represented CDA for the rest of her political career serving in the Senate from 1980 to 1987 and the Council of State from 1987 to 2002.

She died in The Hague in 2016 at the age of 80.
