= Holsey G. Handyside =

Foreign Service Officer

Holsey Gates Handyside (August 23, 1927, Cleveland, Ohio – June 29, 2016) was a career Foreign Service Officer who served as the American Ambassador to Mauritania.

Handyside was the great-great-grandson of Holsey Gates, the founder of Gates Mills, and namesake of the village of Gates Mills, Ohio. He grew up in Bedford, Ohio and attended Western Reserve Academy (Class of 1945). He served in the U.S. Army Air Corps before going on to earn a bachelor's degree at Amherst College (1950, majored in French with a “secondary major” in political science). He studied for a year in Grenoble, France on a Fulbright Scholarship and returned to complete the master's degree program at the Woodrow Wilson School of Public and International Affairs.,
