= P. V. Guharaj =

- Born: 1925
- Died: 12 June 2016 (aged 90–91); Kozhikode

Dr. P.V. Guharaj (1925 - June 12, 2016) was one of the first police surgeons in Kerala. He was director and professor of forensic medicine at Kozhikode Medical College. He has authored a book titled Forensic Medicine which is an authentic reference text in India.

== Professional life ==
He has a Diploma in Medical Jurisprudence from London as well as MRCP from Edinburgh and Glasgow.

Because of the statement he made in the Rajan Murder Case that police torture was the cause of death, Kerala policemen allegedly attacked his house. He appeared before the Kerala High Court and Coimbatore court to give evidence in this case.

The department of Forensic Medicine was started in Kozhikode Medical College during his stint. He worked as a police surgeon for the government of Kerala for 25 years. After retiring from government service, he worked in Nigeria for the Governor of Gongola for three months

The book he authored is a major reference book for police surgeons and barristers.

== Family ==
Aysha Guharaj, who was principal of Kozhikode, Thiruvananthapuram and Alappuzha Medical Colleges and Director of Medical Education, was his wife.
