= Jerry Vaflor =

Filipino footballer and manager

Personal information
- Date of birth: 1939 or 1940
- Date of death: June 12, 2016 (aged 76)
- Place of death: Iloilo City, Philippines
- Height: 5 ft 5 in (1.65 m)
- Position: Defender

Senior career*
Years	Team	Apps	(Gls)
- Meralco Reddy Kilowatts

International career
- Philippines

Managerial career
- Zig-Zag Jaro
- * Club domestic league appearances and goals

Jerry Vaflor (1939/40 – June 12, 2016) was a Filipino international footballer and coach who played as a central defender.

Vaflor played for the Philippines national football team. He played in Manila from 1959 to 1962 before the Philippine Football Federation hired British coaches Alan Rogers and Brian Birch to train the team following a dismal showing of the national team at 1962 Asian Games. The Asian Games stint also saw the Philippines loss to Malaysia by 15-1 which was led by Abdul Ghani who scored 11 of the goals for Malaysia. The two coaches were credited by Vaflor to have changed his playing style.

Jerry Vaflor was named as Mr. Football for 1963 by the Philippine Sportswriters Association due to his feat of scoring a goal in a 1-1 friendly game with the national team against Selangor F.A. led by its sole-scorer Abdul Ghani.

He played competitive football until 1972. Vaflor played for the Meralco Reddy Kilowatts and helped the club win the 1968 Lobregat Cup. After his playing years, he served as coach at La Salle Green Hills. In 1979, he led the Zig-Zag Jaro, composed mostly of collegiate players to the finals of the Philippine National Championship, losing to San Miguel in the final.

Vaflor died on June 12, 2016, at the St. Paul Hospital in Iloilo City due to pneumonia.
