= Curt Hofstad =

American politician (1946–2016)

Member of the North Dakota House of Representatives from the 15th district
- In office December 1, 2006 – June 18, 2016

Personal details
- Born: Curtis L. Hofstad; February 1, 1946 Devils Lake, North Dakota, U.S.
- Died: June 18, 2016 (aged 70) Devils Lake, North Dakota, U.S.
- Resting place: Devils Lake Cemetery, Devils Lake, North Dakota, U.S.
- Party: Republican
- Spouse: Annette Gette (m. 1968)
- Children: 3
- Education: North Dakota State University (BS)
- Occupation: Politician, farmer

Curtis L. "Curt" Hofstad (February 1, 1946 – June 18, 2016) was an American politician and farmer who served in the North Dakota House of Representatives from 2006 to 2016, representing the 15th legislative district of North Dakota as a Republican.

== Early life and education ==
Hofstad was born in Devils Lake, North Dakota on February 1, 1946 to Clarence Hofstad and Helen Lee. He graduated from North Dakota State University with a Bachelor of Science degree.

== Career ==
Hofstad served in the North Dakota House of Representatives from 2006 to 2016, representing the 15th legislative district of North Dakota as a Republican.

During his time in office, Hofstad served as vice chairman of the House Human Services Committee and as a member of the Energy and Natural Resources Committee.

Outside of the North Dakota Legislative Assembly, Hofstad was a farmer. He also served on the Devils Lake Airport Authority and the Starkweather School Board.

== Political positions ==
Hofstad received a 100% rating from North Dakota Right to Life in 2009. He received an A− rating from the NRA Political Victory Fund in 2010.

== Personal life and death ==
Hofstad married Annette Gette on August 3, 1968. They had three children together.

Hofstad died in office of an apparent heart attack on June 18, 2016, aged 70. He was interred in Devils Lake Cemetery.

North Dakota House of Representatives
Preceded by —	Member of the North Dakota House of Representatives from the 15th district 2006–2016	Succeeded by —
