= Marita Lindquist =

Finnish author (1918–2016)

- Born: Marita Elisabeth Gustafson; 10 November 1918; Helsinki, Finland
- Died: 7 June 2016 (aged 97); Helsinki, Finland
- Occupation: Novelist
- Spouse: Alvar Axel Lindquist ( 1940 (m. 1970, died))
- Writing career
- Language: Swedish
- Period: 1964–2000
- Genre: Children’s literature
- Notable work: Kotten series

Marita Elisabeth Lindquist (née Gustafson; 10 November 1918 – 7 June 2016) was a Finnish author of many children's books.

== Biography ==
Born in Helsinki, she was of the Swedish-speaking population of Finland. Her parents were businessman Gösta Henry Wilhelm Gustafson and Ingrid Gertrud Tihleman.In addition, she had written song lyrics, illustrated books, including some of her early works which she published under her maiden name, Gustafson, and worked as a translator, translating the literary history articles for the 1970 book Ungdomsboken i Finland förr och nu, materials writer, producer, editor, and journalist. She was the editor of the children's section at Hufvudstadsbladet from 1953 to 1977.

Lindquist graduated from high school in 1937 from Nya svenska samskolan and then studied languages. Lindquist was active in several literary organisations, serving as secretary for the Swedish Youth Author's Association in Finland and for Finland's Youth Authors from 1952 to 1964. From 1978, she was a board member of the Finnish Institute for Children's Literature. She was the author of hundreds of song texts and poems. Her repertoire included about forty children's books (usually the characters are fictional but for instance in Santtu Ellinoora series they were inspired by her grandchildren).

At the time of her death, Lindquist was already a widow and had two daughters – Marika and Anki, a folk singer (1945–2007). She was married to Alvar Axel Lindquist from 1940 until his death in 1970. She has received many awards (see Awards section), including National Literature Prize (1973, 1975) and Topelius Award (1982). Her books have been translated into many foreign languages.

== Bibliography ==
- Bara en backfish (as Marita Gustafson), 1937
- Ulla-Marika (as Marita Gustafson), 1939
- Lustiga Lisa och Pontus Pelleman (as Marita Gustafson), 1943
- Lilla Barbro Björkelöv, 1948
- Lillemors lapptäcke, 1948
- Vi två och segelsäcken, 1953
- Stina och jag, 1955
- Anderssons klocka i fara, 1957
- Malenas nya bror, 1964
- Malena börjar skolan, 1966
- Malenas finaste sommar, 1967
- Malena och glädjen, 1969
- Malena, 11 år, 1975
- Toffe och Andrea, 1976
- Andrea + 6 cm, Toffe + 7 cm, 1977
- Kottens bakvända B, 1978
- Du klarar det, Kotten, 1978
- Kotten vågar inte gå hem, 1978
- Vem tar hand om Kotten?, 1979
- Toffe och Andrea i sommarskogen, 1979
- Kalla mig Robban, 1979
- Det var ditt fel Robban, 1980
- Hugg i, Robban, 1981
- Marielle och Madame, 1982
- Marielle och Vera-Teresa, 1983
- Columbus och Matilda, 1984
- Av pappa, så klart!, 1984
- Columbus klass 1B, 1985
- Min katt heter Mirre Sundström: verser på lek och allvar, 1985
- Det var inte jag, 1988
- Du misstar dig Sanna, 1988
- Vuokko Vendela Kristofferson, 1989
- Stora planer, Sanna, 1990
- Spöket James och benbrotten, 1992
- Milligram och småspökena, 1993
- Nikodemus, 1995
- Festa och fira!: årets högtider förr och nu, 1995
- Teater! Teater!, 1998
- Majali i juni månad, 2000

== Awards ==
- 1970: Swedish Literature Society prize
- 1973: National Literature Prize
- 1975: National Literature Prize
- 1975: Bonniers children's scholarship
- 1980: Swedish Literature Society prize
- 1981: Swedish People's School Friends of Culture Prize
- 1982: Topelius Prize
- 1985: Swedish Authors' Fund prize
- 1989: State Children Cultural
- 1990: Nygrénska Foundation prize
- 1999: Cultural Foundation prize
- 2008: The Längman Culture Foundation Prize

== Sources ==
- Uppslagsverket Finland. (in Swedish)
- Swedish and Finnish Wikipedia
- Biography.
