= Mudrarakshas =

Hindi writer

- Born: Subhash Chandra; 21 June 1933; Lucknow, British India
- Died: 13 June 2016 (aged 82); Lucknow, India
- Education: M.A.
- Alma mater: University of Lucknow
- Occupations: Writer; journalist; activist; critic
- Writing career
- Notable awards: Sangeet Natak Akademi Award

Mudrarakshas (born Subhash Chandra; 21 June 1933 – 13 June 2016) was an Indian writer, journalist, activist, and critic. Based in Lucknow, he was a prominent figure in Hindi literature and contemporary thought, recognized for his advocacy for Dalits and marginalized communities.

== Early life and education ==
Subhash Chandra was born in Lucknow on 21 June 1933. He earned his M.A. in Hindi from the University of Lucknow. During the 1950s, he worked for the Kolkata-based Gyanodaya magazine. In 1962, he joined All India Radio (AIR) in Delhi as a script editor, eventually serving as an instructor until 1976, when he resigned to pursue independent writing and activism.

== Career ==
Mudrarakshas was a versatile contributor to Indian arts, particularly focusing on Awadhi folk forms such as Nautanki, Bhand, Swang, and Bharthari. Over a career spanning six decades, he authored over 60 books and directed approximately 30 stage productions. His literary work often engaged with social justice, critical theory, and the rights of minorities. He also served as the editor of the Hindi magazine Anuvaarta.

== Awards and recognition ==
He was a recipient of the Sangeet Natak Akademi Award and the Sangeet Natak Academy Ratna Sadasyata. Other honors included:

Awards: Sahitya Bhushan, Kaifi Azmi Award, and the Sarvoday Sahitya Award.

Titles: He was conferred titles such as Dalit Ratna, Shudracharya, and Lok Natya Shiromani in recognition of his social and cultural contributions.

== Bibliography ==
Mudrarakshas was a prolific writer, contributing to various literary genres, including plays, novels, short stories, satire, literary criticism, and children's literature. His works reflect his critical engagement with social and political issues.

=== Plays ===
- Yours Faithfully
- Daku
- Ala Afsar
- Tendua
- Santola
- Marjeeva
- Tilchatta
- Gufayein
- Ginipig
- Badbakht Badshah

=== English Literature ===
- The Hunted
- Re-reading Jesus

=== Novels ===
- Madelin
- Makbara
- Achla Ek Manahsthiti
- Shanti Bhang
- Bhagoda
- Hum Sab Mansaram
- Narkiya
- Dandvidhan
- Ardhvrat
- Hastakshep
- Shok Samvad
- Shabd Dansh
- Mera Naam Tera Naam
- Gyarah Sapno Ka Desh

=== Short Story Collections ===
- Pratihinsa Tatha Anya Kahaniyan
- Nihatthe
- 21 Shreshth Kahaniyan
- 10 Pratinidhi Kahaniyan
- Meri Kahaniyan
- Mudrarakshas Sankalit Kahaniyan
- Shreshth Dalit Kahaniyan

=== Satirical Works ===
- Mathuradas Ki Dairy
- Rakshas Uchav
- Prapanchtantra
- Suno Bhai Sadho
- Ek Aur Prapanchtantra

=== Critical and Analytical Works ===
- Dharmgranthon Ka Punarpaath
- Mudrarakshas Srajan Evam Sandarbh
- Bhartiya Arthtantra Nishane Pe
- Bahas Chaurahe Pe
- Beech Bahas Main
- Alochana Aur Rachna Ki Uljhane
- Kalateet
- Bhagat Singh Hone Ka Matlab
- Nemichandra Jain
- Dharm Banam Andhvishwas
- Bhartiya Sanskriti Aur Vampanth
- Sahitya Samiksha – Paribhashayein Aur Samasyayein
- Bhartiya Sanskriti Ke Chitra
- Nitshe
- Gospello Ka Punarpaath

=== Children's Literature ===
- Chitipuram Ke Bhure Lal
- Sarla Billu Aur Jala

Mudrarakshas also worked as an editor for the Hindi magazine Anuvaarta and made significant contributions to literary discourse through his critiques and analyses.
