= Ayaz Jani =

Sindhi-language poet (1967–2016)

- اياز جاني
- Born: Ayaz Hussain Channa; 4 October 1967; Larkana, Sindh, Pakistan
- Died: 6 June 2016 (aged 48); Karachi, Pakistan
- Occupation: Poet
- Spouse: Sajida Parveen
- Children: Mansoor Ali
- Writing career
- Subject: Sindhi poetry
- Website: www.ayazjani.com

Ayaz Hussain Jani (Sindhi: اياز جاني), (4 October 1967 – 6 June 2016) was a Sindhi-language poet. He died at the age of 49.

== See also ==
- Jani (disambiguation)
