= Robert Després =

- Born: September 27, 1924; Quebec City, Quebec
- Died: June 14, 2016 (aged 91)
- Occupation: businessman
- Awards: Order of Canada; National Order of Quebec

Robert Després, OC GOQ (September 27, 1924 – June 14, 2016) was a French Canadian businessman. Després had a bachelor's degree and an MBA from Université Laval.

In 2006, Després was appointed chairman of the Board of Directors of Cominar Real Estate Investment Trust, one of the largest commercial real estate property owners and managers in the province of Quebec.

In 1978, he was made an Officer of the Order of Canada. In 2003, he was made a Grand Officer of the National Order of Quebec. He died from lung cancer on June 14, 2016.

== Career ==
Robert Després was the president of D.R.M. Holdings Incorporated, and also the chairman of the board of directors at Domosys Corporation and Obzerv Technologies Incorporated. Després was also a member of the board of directors for the National Optics Institute, GenePOC Incorporated and H.R.S. Holdings Incorporated. In Després' past he had honorably served in the boards of directors in numerous companies, including: Camdev Corporation, CFCF Incorporated, Mitel Corporation, Atomic Energy of Canada Limited, Manulife Financial Corporation, Domtar Incorporated, Norcen Energy Resources Limited, Wajax Corporation Limited, Canada Malting Company Limited, Provigo Incorporated, Alliance Forest Products Incorporated, National Trust Company, and Sidbec-Dosco Incorporated.

Després was a fellow of the Order of Accredited Management Accountants of Quebec (FCMA), the Order of Certified Professional Accountants of Quebec (FCPA), the Order of Certified General Accountants of Quebec (FCGA) and the Institute of Corporate Directors. Després was a member of the Audit Committee and the Nominating and Governance Committee.
