= William Rohwer =

William D. Rohwer
- Born: William Dan Rohwer; October 2, 1937; Denver, Colorado
- Died: June 26, 2016 (aged 78)
- Education: Harvard University; University of California, Berkeley
- Spouse: Carol Rohwer
- Children: Four
- Scientific career
- Fields: Educational psychology
- Institutions: University of California, Berkeley

William Dan Rohwer Jr. (October 2, 1937 — June 26, 2016) was an American educational psychologist.

== Early life and education ==
Rohwer was born on October 2, 1937, in Denver, Colorado, to Dan and Gladys Rohwer. He was educated at Harvard University and the University of California, Berkeley.

== Academic career ==
Rohwer became a professor at the UC Berkeley Graduate School of Education in 1964. He was a fellow of the Center for Advanced Study in the Behavioral Sciences at Stanford University from 1979 to 1980. He served as Dean of the Graduate School of Education at Berkeley from 1989 until his retirement in 1996.

== Research ==
Rohwer has been called "a pioneer in the study of verbal and imaginal representational processes among children." He conducted research on the determinants of children's and adolescents' learning abilities, such as the type of educational technique used and the student's socioeconomic status.

== Personal life and death ==
Rohwer and his wife, Carol, had four children. William and Carol Rohwer were both wine aficionados who founded West Coast Fine Wines in their retirement. William died of lung cancer at his home on June 26, 2016.
