= Robert A. Duin =

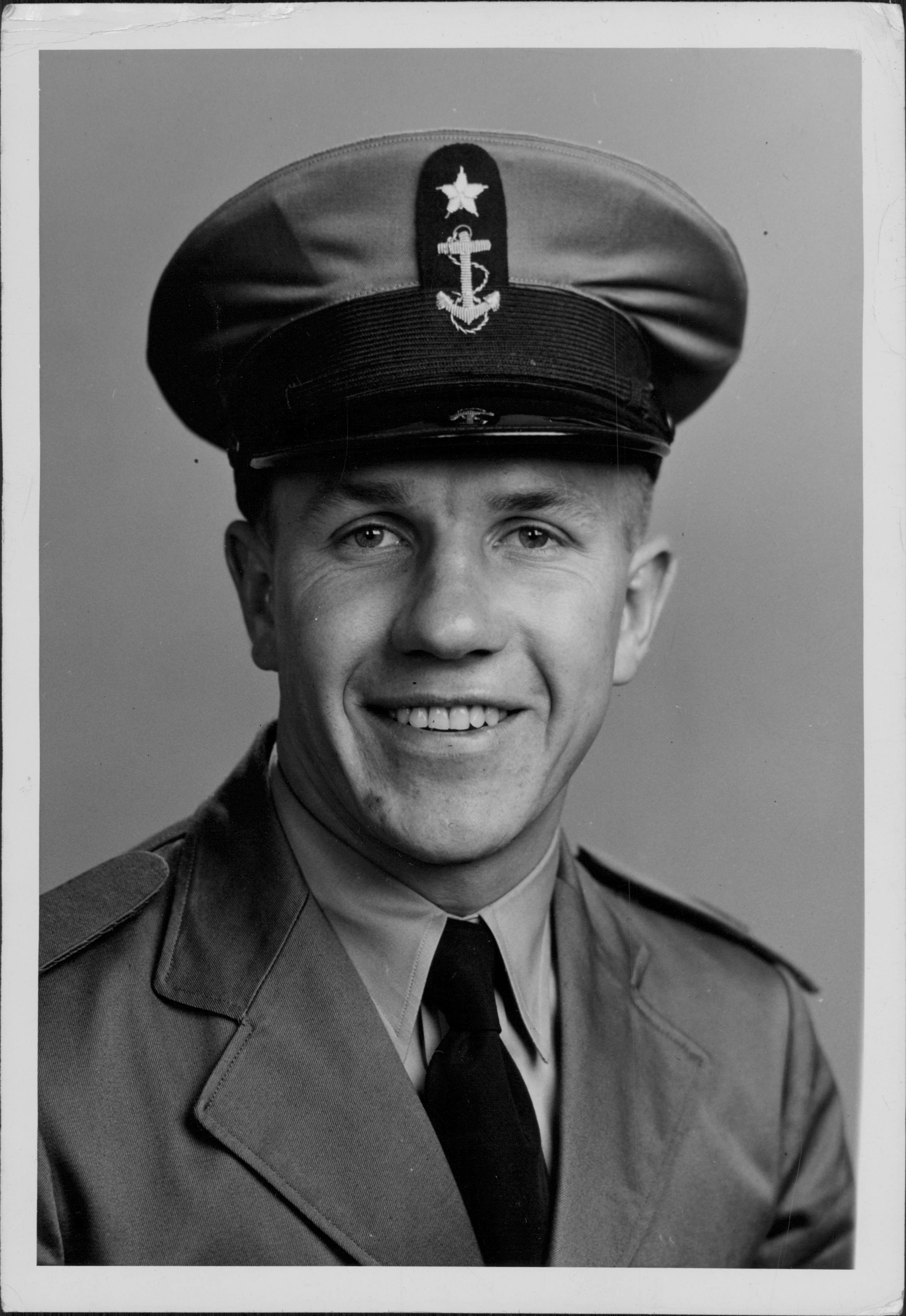
Robert Alan Duin

Robert Alan Duin (September 27, 1924 - June 24, 2016) was a rear admiral in the United States Coast Guard.

== Biography ==
Duin was born in 1924 in New Ulm, Minnesota. He later attended the University of Minnesota, Lafayette College and the Massachusetts Institute of Technology.

== Career ==
Duin originally joined the United States Army in 1943. He was assigned to the 69th Infantry Division at Camp Shelby.

The following year, he entered the United States Coast Guard Academy. While there, Duin became active in sports. He would play baseball and basketball and serve as captain of the football team. Duin was inducted into the Academy's Athletic Hall of Fame in 1984.

After graduating in 1948, Duin was assigned to the USCGC Gresham (WAVP-387). He later served aboard the USCGC Yakutat (WAVP-380) and the USCGC Coos Bay (WAVP-376) before being stationed in Canada from 1950 to 1951.

Duin later became Ship Superintendent of the United States Coast Guard Yard before serving aboard the USCGC Winnebago (WHEC-40) from 1956 to 1958. Afterwards, he was assigned to the Technical Division of the United States Merchant Marine staff.

From 1962 to 1966, Duin was a member of the faculty of the Coast Guard Academy. Additionally, he trained cadets aboard the USCGC Eagle (WIX-327).

After returning for a time to the Coast Guard Yard, Duin was named Chief of the Ocean Engineering Division in 1969. He remained in the position until 1971. In 1974, he returned to the Coast Guard Yard as commanding officer. Duin was promoted to rear admiral in 1975.

Awards he received for his service in both the Army and the Coast Guard include the Coast Guard Commendation Medal, the Army Good Conduct Medal, the World War II Victory Medal and the National Defense Service Medal.
