= Edward D. Sheafer Jr. =

United States admiral (1940–2016)

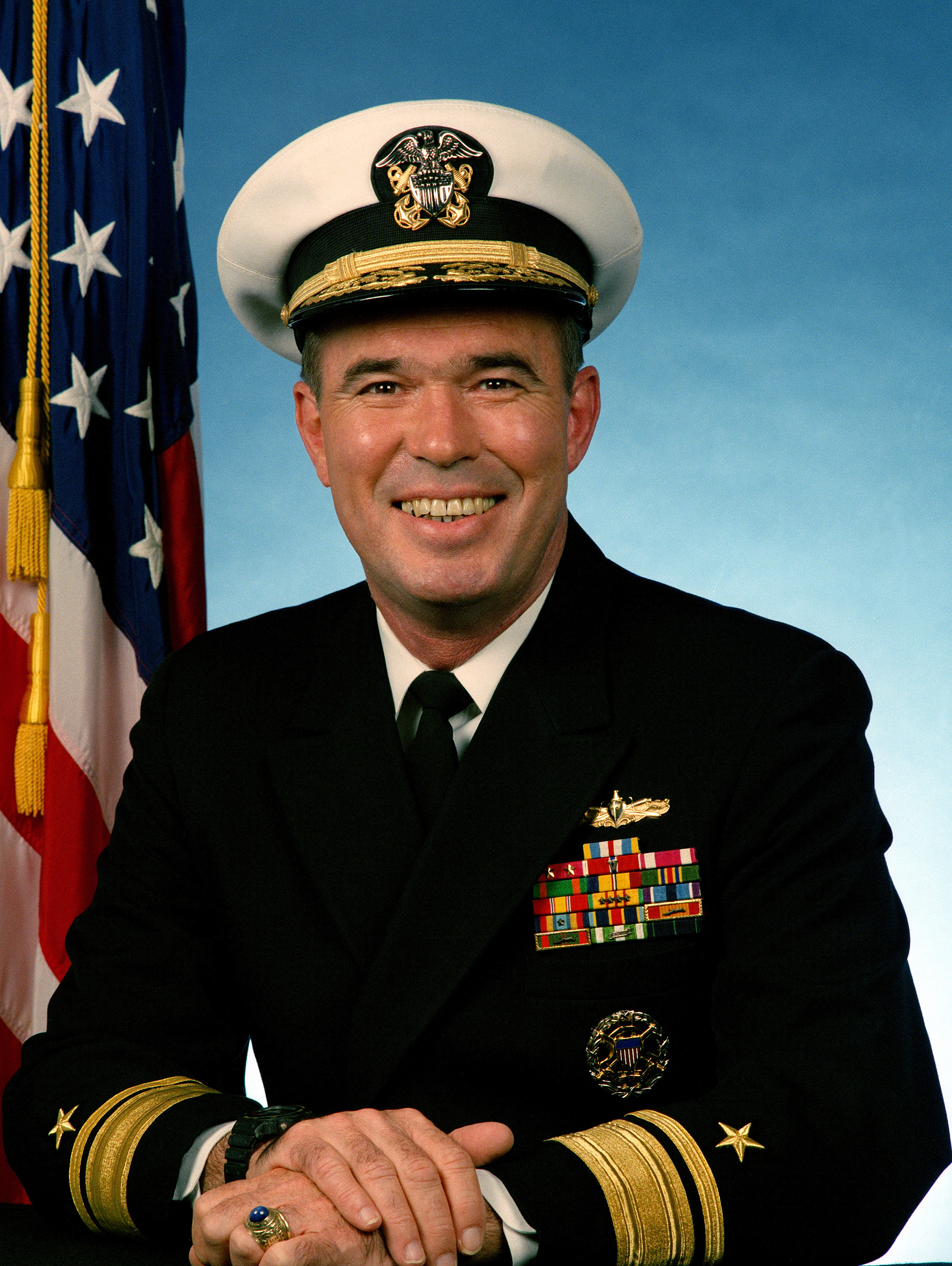
- Born: Edward David Sheafer Jr. November 27, 1940; Pittsburgh, Pennsylvania, U.S.
- Died: June 27, 2016 (aged 75); Central City, Pennsylvania, U.S.
- Occupation: Naval officer
- Known for: Intelligence assignments

Rear Admiral Edward David Sheafer Jr. (November 27, 1940 – June 27, 2016) was an officer of the United States Navy.

== Naval career ==
Born and raised in Pittsburgh, Sheafer graduated from the Shady Side Academy in 1958. After graduating from the U.S. Naval Academy in 1962, Sheafer served as a surface warfare officer for ten years, including command at sea of the USS Persistent (MSO-491), an oceangoing minesweeper. Following a tour in Vietnam, Sheafer attended graduate school at Georgetown University, where he received a master's degree in Foreign Service.

Sheafer's career includes assignments such as Chief Intelligence Officer (J-2) for the Chairman of the Joint Chiefs of Staff with Admiral William J. Crowe and General Colin Powell, and Deputy Director of the Defense Intelligence Agency during Desert Storm. Sheafer served as Director of Naval intelligence from August 1991 to September 1994, commanding an organization of 2,500 people, with a budget of more than $2 billion. Sheafer pioneered a number of efforts in the intelligence world and is known as the father of the Joint Worldwide Intelligence Communications System (JWICS).

Other positions Sheafer has held include:

- Fleet Intelligence Officer for Commander Seventh Fleet (Pacific/Indian Ocean)
- Officer-in-Charge (OIC) Fleet Ocean Surveillance Information Center (Hawaii)
- OIC Fleet Ocean Surveillance Information Facility (Japan)
- Soviet Submarine Analyst, Commander US Naval Forces Europe (London)

== Later career ==
Having served more than 35 years, Admiral Edward D. Sheafer Jr. retired from the Navy in 1995. Following his retirement, Sheafer served as an advisor at senior levels in the defense and intelligence communities.

== Personal ==
Sheafer was the son of Edward David Sheafer Sr. (February 2, 1900 – June 6, 1972) and Frances Spraggon Sheafer (April 18, 1907 – May 18, 1997). They were married in Pittsburgh on December 22, 1939. His father was a veteran of World War I.

Sheafer Jr. was married to Enid Suzanne Sheafer. The couple had two daughters and three grandchildren.

After his first marriage ended in divorce, Sheafer married divorcee Patricia Loughrey (Ganson) Westine in 1982.

Sheafer was interred at Arlington National Cemetery on March 24, 2017.
