= Yevgeny Agureyev =

Yevgeny Yakovlevich Agureyev (Russian: Евгений Яковлевич Агуреев; 16 January 1951 – 3 June 2016) was a Soviet bandy player, judge, coach and a functionary in Kazakhstan.

== Biography ==
In 1969 at age eighteen, Agureyev played for the Volga Ulyanovsk Bandy Club. Three years later, he was called up for military service. He served in Khabarovsk Krai as a member of the Sports Clubs of the Army.

In 1974, Agureyev moved to Alma-Ata where he played for the Dynamo Alma-Ata Bandy Club. Ten years later, Agureyev played his final season with the Kuzbass Kemerovo Bandy Club.

Over the course of his career in the USSR championship, Agureyev scored 634 goals. He also led the league in goals scored in the 1978-79 season with 74.

From 1986 to 1992, Agureyev was a judge of USSR championship matches in hockey and bandy. Between 1994-1995 Agureyev was the head coach of the Kazakhstan national bandy team. In 1995-1996, he was President of the Kazakhstan Bandy Federation. Later he worked for the State Committee for Physical Culture and Sports of Kazakhstan.
