= Wang Sichao =

Chinese astronomer and scholar (1937–2016)

Wang Sichao 王思潮
- Undated photo of Wang Sichao
- Born: 1937; Rong County, Guangxi, China
- Died: 17 June 2016 (aged 77); Nanjing, China
- Education: Peking University
- Occupation: Astronomer
- Years active: 1963–2016

Chinese name
- Chinese: 王思潮
Transcriptions
Standard Mandarin
- Hanyu Pinyin: Wáng Sī Cháo
Yue: Cantonese
- Jyutping: Wong^{4} Si^{1} Ciu^{4}

Wang Sichao (Chinese: 王思潮; 1937 – 17 June 2016) was a Chinese astronomer and scholar. Between 1963 and 1999, he was a researcher at the Purple Mountain Observatory in Nanjing. Wang researched asteroids, meteors, comets, and unidentified flying objects.

== Early life and education ==
Wang was born in 1937 in Rong County in Guangxi. His ancestral hometown is in Guangzhou in Guangdong. In his youth, he attended the primary and secondary schools affiliated with Sun Yat-sen University as well as the secondary school affiliated with South China Normal University. Wang attended the Peking University where he received an astrophysics degree from the Department of Geophysics.

== Career ==
Upon graduation, in 1963 Wang joined the Purple Mountain Observatory as a research intern. He was promoted to an assistant research position, an associate researcher position, and then a researcher position. He retired in 1999 from the observatory. As the first promoter in China of conducting studies of Near-Earth objects and asteroid impact avoidance, Wang was a pioneer of Chinese meteorology research.

Alongside Ouyang Ziyuan in 1976, Wang did in-depth studies of meteor showers that happened in Jilin. China News Service said Wang's research "achieved important results". To conduct research where a meteor hit in Ningqiang County, he visited the Qin Mountains to retrieve samples. Wang researched the falling ice in Wuxi. Wang conducted research on comets for China. In addition to studying Comet Hale–Bopp, he travelled to Australia with the astronomer Zhang Jiaxiang during Halley's Comet's 1986 apparition to collect information about it. His research team correctly foresaw when a comet would collide in 1994. Wang helped design and make a Near-Earth object telescope in Xuyi County.

Wang began investigating unidentified flying objects (UFOs) in 1971. Wang believed that extraterrestrial life exists, possesses anti-gravity technology and is benevolent, stating this during interviews with the media such as China Central Television. On one occasion, the popular science writer Fang Zhouzi stated that Wang had not provided proof for his claims. Through email, Wang reached out to people in China who had seen UFOs to work with them to investigate the UFOs.

China News Service called him "a well-known astronomy education expert in China". He taught about planetary science, Small Solar System bodies, meteorites, and the search for extraterrestrial life. He wrote popular science books and frequently appeared on television shows. During the Internet era, he started Sina Weibo and WeChat accounts through which he shared information about astronomy.

== Personal life and death ==
To fund his child's or children's overseas education, Wang borrowed 300,000 yuan (US$48,420.22). He put on pause the self-funded Big Dipper Observation Award (Chinese: 北斗星观测奖), which he had created in 2007 to raise awareness of UFOs, so that he could repay the education loan.

Wang died on 17 June 2016 in Nanjing at the age of 77 after a cerebral haemorrhage. His funeral was held on 19 June at the Nanjing Funeral Parlor in the Xitian Temple (Chinese: 西天寺).
