= Black Angus Steakhouse =

American steakhouse

- Black Angus Steakhouse in Los Angeles
- Type: Private
- Industry: Restaurants
- Genre: Casual dining
- Founded: April 3, 1964; 62 years ago Los Altos, California
- Founders: Stuart Anderson
- Headquarters: Burbank, California, United States
- Number of locations: 30 (October 2025)
- Key people: Stuart Anderson (founder)
- Revenue: $150 million (2017)
- Owner: Versa Capital Management
- Website: blackangus.com

Black Angus Steakhouse, also known before 2005 as Stuart Anderson's Black Angus, is an American restaurant chain that specializes in steaks. Founded in 1964 by Stuart Anderson, the chain is headquartered in Burbank, California.

== History ==
Stuart Anderson (1922–2016) founded the Black Angus Steakhouse chain in 1964. The chain grew in the 1960s and early 1970s promising reasonable prices for offerings. Western styled advertisements touted "steak dinner with all the fixings – just a buck ninety-nine." Saga acquired Black Angus in 1972. Marriott acquired Saga in 1987, and sold several of the Saga restaurants to American Restaurant Group.

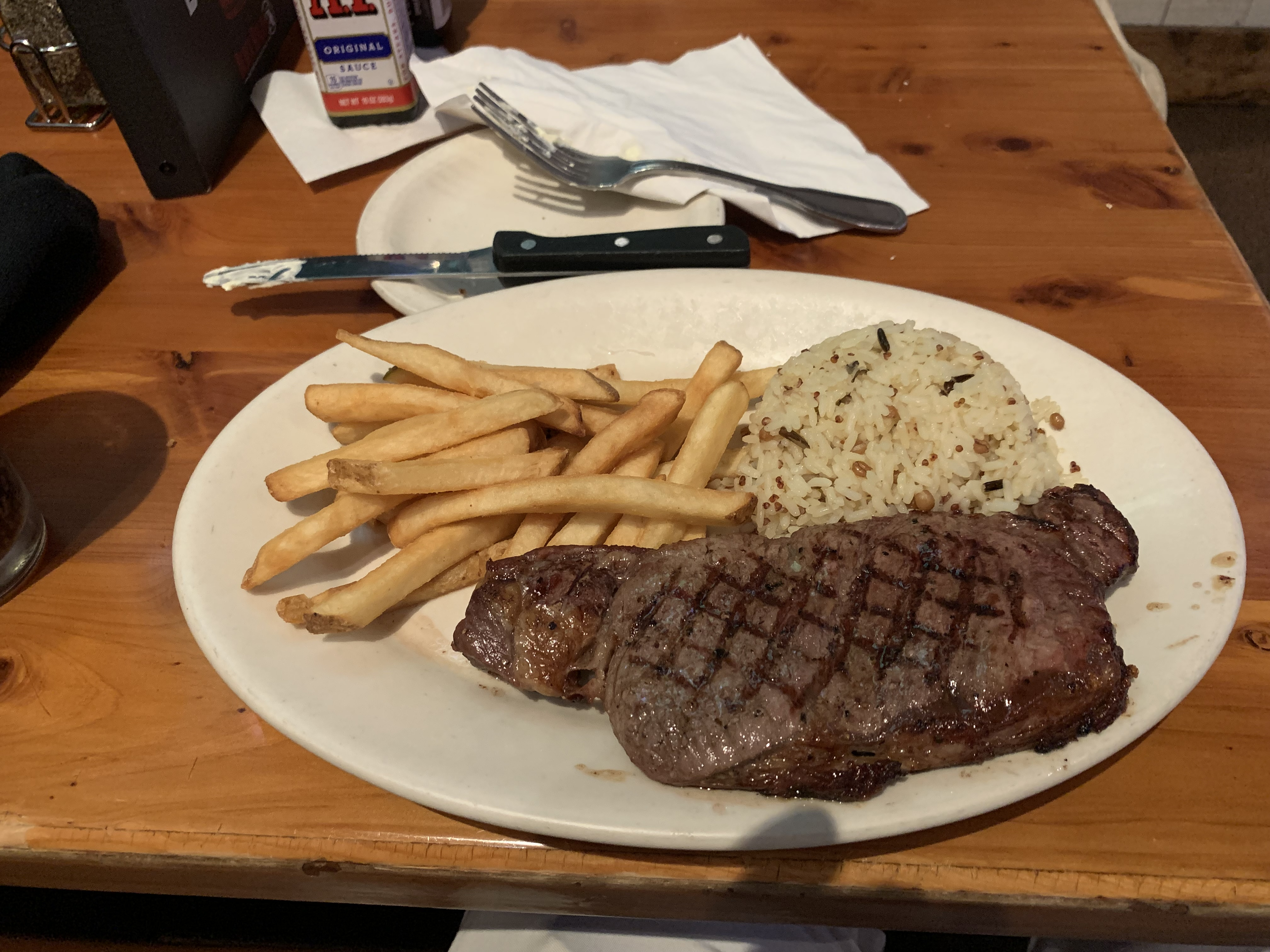
A New York Strip

In 1995, the chain had 101 restaurants and reported revenue of $244 million. In 1999, the overall parent company's profits were steady at $104.7 million, but higher for the Black Angus chain. By 2001, there were 103 Black Angus restaurants in 13 states, and each restaurant had approximately 75 employees and served an average of 3,000 customers weekly. By 2004, the number had fallen to 93 Black Angus and Cattle Company restaurants in 10 states, with 57 units in California.

In September 2004, American Restaurant Group filed for Chapter 11 bankruptcy protection for Black Angus Steakhouse. Black Angus was indebted approximately $202 million and had in 2003 reported revenue of $276.6 million resulting in a net loss of $32.5 million. The bankruptcy proceeded concurrently with an effort to re-brand and remodel the chain.

On January 15, 2009, American Restaurant Group itself filed for Chapter 11 bankruptcy protection. Versa Capital Management Inc. purchased Black Angus Steakhouse in March 2009. As of October 2025, there are 30 Black Angus locations across Arizona, California, Hawaii, New Mexico and Washington.

== In popular culture ==
It is referenced by Bart Simpson in The Simpsons episode "Lisa the Skeptic."

== See also ==
- List of buffet restaurants
- List of casual dining restaurant chains
- Sizzler
