= André Warusfel =

French mathematician

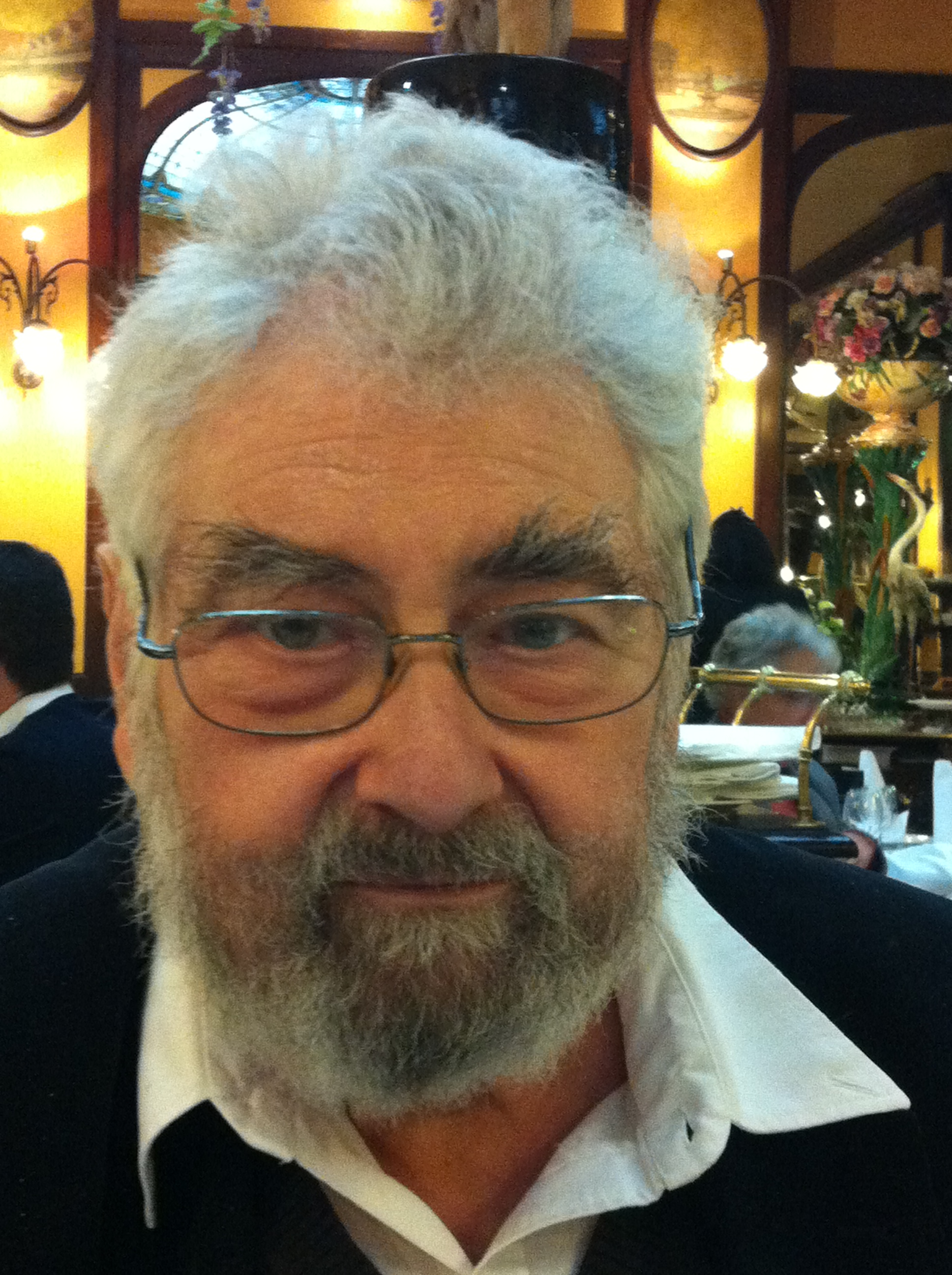
- Born: 1 December 1936; Douai, France
- Died: 6 June 2016 (aged 79)
- Education: École Normale Supérieure
- Scientific career
- Fields: Mathematics
- Website: https://andre.warusfel.fr

André Warusfel (1 December 1936 – 6 June 2016) was a French mathematician and an alumnus of the École Normale Supérieure.

He taught for many years in preparatory classes, mainly in high schools Henri IV and Louis-le-Grand. Inspector General of mathematics from 1994 to 2001, he is Inspector General Emeritus of Mathematics Education.

Editor of the Revue de mathématiques spéciales ("Journal of special mathematics") from 1974 until 2007, André Warusfel is also a writer and science journalist specializing in mathematics. As a science journalist, he was, in 1964, one of the reshapers of the journal Atomes ("Atoms"), future journal La Recherche ("Research").

Also passionate about the history of science, he devoted much of his recent research to the mathematical work of René Descartes. He assured a new edition of the text La Géométrie ("Geometry") which was published in 2009 in the third volume of the complete works of Descartes (TEL collection, ed. Gallimard). On the same subject, he defended a thesis at the University of Paris Sorbonne-Paris IV in June 2010, edited by Jean-Luc Marion.

He also published a 2009 book on the work of Leonhard Euler, which includes an introductory chapter providing a summary of the evolution of the history of mathematics.

He is also the author of several scientific papers on the history and education of mathematics, including a 2005 article on the formation of French mathematicians in the twentieth century, and on the same year on the history of the resolution of algebraic equations.

== Works ==
- 1961 : Les Nombres et leurs mystères ("Numbers and their mysteries"), Éditions du Seuil (réédité Collection Points, Le Seuil)
- 1966 : Dictionnaire raisonné de mathématiques ("Rational dictionary of mathematics"), Éditions du Seuil
- 1969 : Les mathématiques modernes ("Modern mathematics"), Éditions du Seuil
- 1971 : Structures algébriques finies ("Finite algebraic structures"), Hachette
- 1975 : Les Mathématiques ("Mathematics"), collective work in the encyclopedias of modern knowledge
- 1981 : Réussir Le Rubik's Cube ("Succeed with the Rubik's Cube"), Éditions Denoël, preface by Ernő Rubik
- 2000 : Les Mathématiques : plaisir et nécessité ("Mathematics: pleasure and necessity"), Éditions Vuibert, with Albert Ducrocq
- 2009 : Euler : les mathématiques et la vie ("Euler: mathematics and life"), Éditions Vuibert
