= Chineko Sugawara =

Japanese actress and voice actress

- 菅原 チネ子
- Born: 3 September 1938; Iwate Prefecture
- Died: 26 June 2016 (aged 77); Tokyo
- Other names: Chineko Wakasa (real name)
- Citizenship: Japan
- Occupations: Actress; voice actress
- Television: Wataru Seken wa Oni Bakari

Chineko Sugawara (菅原 チネ子, Sugawara Chineko; real name Chineko Wakasa (若狭 チネ子, Wakasa Chineko), 3 September 1938 – 26 June 2016) was a Japanese actress and voice actress from Iwate Prefecture. She was represented with Gekidan For You.

== Filmography ==
=== TV dramas ===
Year	Title	Role	Network
1972	Onihei Hankachō	Woman from Kaga	NET
1972	Taiyō ni Hoero!		NTV
1977	Aniki	Mrs. Okamura	TBS
1978	Shiroi Kyotō	Ume Yamada's wife	Fuji TV
1980	Hadaka no Taishō		Fuji TV
1980	Kinpachi-sensei	Kaneko Fujita	TBS
1981	Ore wa Gosenzo-sama		NTV
1981	Onna Taikō-ki	Asa	NHK
1983	Oyū		TBS
1990	Wataru Seken wa Oni Bakari	Hatsue Kawashima	TBS

=== Films ===
Year	Title	Role
1988	A Taxing Woman's Return	Woman from cafeteria

=== Dubbing ===
Year	Title	Role	Network
	Mirrors 2		
	The Girl with the Dragon Tattoo		
2010	Agatha Christie's Poirot "Mrs McGinty's Dead"	Laura Upward	NHK-BS2
2012	The Skin I Live In	Marilia	
2014	Agatha Christie's Poirot "Elephants Can Remember"	Mrs. McHam	NHK-BS Premium
