= Elaina Marie Tuttle =

American behavioral geneticist, biology professor (1963–2016)

- Born: November 9, 1963; Nashua, New Hampshire, U.S.
- Died: June 15, 2016 (aged 52); Indianapolis, Indiana, U.S.
- Education: State University of New York at Albany
- Occupations: Ornithologist; Professor
- Years active: 1993–2016
- Employer: Indiana State University
- Known for: Discovering the four sex "supergene" in the white-throated sparrow
- Spouse: Rusty Gonser
- Children: 1
- Awards: Theodore Dreiser Award for Research and Creativity; ISU President's Medal; 2006 Promising Scholar

Elaina Marie Tuttle (November 9, 1963 – June 15, 2016) was an American behavioral geneticist and biology professor whose academic research focused on ornithology and study of the white-throated sparrow. During her graduate and post-doctoral work, she investigated how bird sexual selection has evolved and the trade-offs in reproduction that have occurred alongside sperm competition mechanisms in sparrows and in the fairy wren.

Her last major publication in 2016 discussed the evolution of a sexual "supergene" in the white-throated sparrow that has created a complementary pair of genetic sexes in addition to the W and Z sex chromosomes found in birds. The decades of work researching the sparrow at the Cranberry Lake Biological Station (CLBS) for Indiana State University resulted in her being given multiple awards and the President's Medal for her accomplishments.

== Childhood and education ==
Born in Nashua, New Hampshire on November 9, 1963, to Raymond Tuttle and Ingeborg Leichsenring Tuttle and having later been raised in West Springfield, Massachusetts, Elaina attended West Springfield High School where she showed an early interest in ecology and investigating tadpoles in local environments. She attended Siena College for her undergraduate degree and then the State University of New York at Albany for her Ph.D and, during her work for the former, began acting as a field assistant for professor Doug Fraser at the CLBS. Her graduate studies were done with professor Thomas Caraco and she also did research with professors Chip Aquadro and David Westneat. Her 1993 Ph.D. dissertation discussed the white-throated sparrow and how the different color morphs are kept at a stable and equal amount in each subsequent generation.

She continued her research at Indiana University Bloomington as a post-doctoral fellow for Ellen Ketterson, which included an international trip to the United Kingdom for additional ornithology research with Tim Birkhead. The latter part of her post-doctoral education took place at the University of Chicago with an additional fellowship in the lab of Stephen Pruett-Jones and another international trip instead to Australia to study the fairy wren.

== Career ==
After completing her post-doctoral studies, Tuttle was hired as a faculty member and professor at St. Mary's College of Maryland where she ran her own undergraduate lab that focused around research conducted at the Cranberry Lake Biological Station. She later became a full professor at Indiana State University (ISU) and helped found the university's graduate level building for genetic counseling research named the Center for Genomic Advocacy. In early 2016, she was made associate dean for ISU's College of Graduate and Professional Studies.

Starting in 2010, Tuttle was made an associate editor for the academic journal The Auk.

== Research ==
The research that Tuttle focused on during her undergraduate work began with the white-throated sparrow alongside Doug Fraser and at the CLBS. Her later graduate and post-doctoral studies would expand to the subjects of sexual selection and reproductive trade-offs. This led into how the process of sperm competition functions in birds. A large amount of her research thereafter would involve sperm collection and she frequently made the subject a part of her speaking engagements and presentations, leading to her being given the nickname "The Sperminator".

In 2016, she and her husband published a study describing the four sexes that make up the white-throated sparrow species and how a genetic mutation had tied coloring differences to distinct behavioral activities, resulting in mating pairs only forming between differently colored sparrows. This active and recent evolutionary change was highly similar to the early formation of the human X and Y chromosomes, with a sequence inversion causing an inheritable "supergene" that caused differential groupings for mating. This has resulted in the species having not only common male and female individuals, but also independent tan and white individuals as sexual differentiators. The act of disassortative mating for the species revolves around the birds with white stripes having genetically connected behavior traits of being outgoing, aggressive in defending their territory, and generally promiscuous in a manner that is poor at raising chicks, while the birds with tan stripes are more docile, only mate monogamously, and are highly focused on raising and protecting their chicks. These behavioral differences have resulted in the species only forming white-tan mating pairs in order to be able to successfully defend their territory and raise their chicks, as any same color pairs would have a much lower likelihood of passing on their genes and raising chicks to adulthood.

== Awards and honors ==
From Indiana State University, Tuttle was given the Theodore Dreiser Award for Research and Creativity, along with the President's Medal from the university president. She was named an ISU Promising Scholar in 2006, which included grant funding from the Lilly Endowment, and this led to an approved National Institutes of Health research grant of $600,000 in October 2009. That same year, she was given the Outstanding Teacher award for ISU.

== Personal life ==
Tuttle married Rusty Gonser in 1994 while working on her graduate degree after having first met him in 1991. They had a son named Caleb in 2000. In 2011, Tuttle was diagnosed with breast cancer that went into remission after treatment, but re-emerged and spread to her lungs in 2013. She died on June 15, 2016.

== Selected publications ==
- — (May 2003). "Alternative reproductive strategies in the white-throated sparrow: behavioral and genetic evidence". Behavioral Ecology. 14 (3): 425–432. doi:10.1093/beheco/14.3.425.
- —; Bergland, Alan O.; Korody, Marisa L.; Brewer, Michael S.; Newhouse, Daniel J.; Minx, Patrick; Stager, Maria; Betuel, Adam; Cheviron, Zachary A.; Warren, Wesley C.; Gonser, Rusty A.; Balakrishnan, Christopher N. (February 2016). "Divergence and Functional Degradation of a Sex Chromosome-like Supergene". Current Biology. 26 (3): 344–350. Bibcode:2016CBio...26..344T. doi:10.1016/j.cub.2015.11.069. PMC 4747794. PMID 26804558.
