= Peter Tennant (cricketer) =

English cricketer

Personal information
- Full name: Peter Norie Tennant
- Born: 17 April 1942; Sutton Coldfield, Warwickshire, England
- Died: 23 June 2016 (aged 74)
- Batting: Right-handed
- Role: Wicket-keeper

Domestic team information
- Years: Team
- 1964: Warwickshire

Career statistics
Competition	First-class
Matches	1
Runs scored	–
Batting average	–
100s/50s	–/–
Top score	–
Balls bowled	–
Wickets	–
Bowling average	–
5 wickets in innings	–
10 wickets in match	–
Best bowling	–
Catches/stumpings	3/1
- Source: Cricinfo, 14 November 2011

Peter Norie Tennant (17 April 1942 – 23 June 2016) was an English cricketer. Tennant was a right-handed batsman who fielded as a wicket-keeper. He was born at Sutton Coldfield, Warwickshire.

Tennant made a single first-class appearance for Warwickshire County Cricket Club against Scotland at Edgbaston in 1964. He was not required to bat during the match, but behind the stumps he took 3 catches and made a single stumping. This was his only major appearance for Warwickshire.

He died in June 2016 at the age of 74.
