= Theo Dilissen =

Belgian basketball player and businessman (1953-2016)

- Born: 3 August 1953; Wilrijk, Belgium
- Died: 28 June 2016 (aged 62); Halle, Belgium

Theo Dilissen (3 August 1953 in Wilrijk, Belgium – 28 June 2016 in Halle, Belgium) was a Belgian businessman and basketball player. He was Chairman of the Board of Directors of Belgacom from October 2004 until 2012.

== Education ==
Theo Dilissen graduated with a degree in sociology and held a Master in Business Administration.

== Career ==
He started his career at ISS, a Danish company, where he became COO and Member of the Board. From 2000 to 2004 he was active at Real Software, a Belgian ICT company. From 2001 onwards he was the CEO of Real Software, and performed a restructuring in order to recover the company. Real Software following an M&A is currently known as RealDolmen. From 2005 to 2009 he was CEO and chairman of Aviapartner, a Belgian airport services provider. From June 2010 he was appointed CEO and chairman of Arcadis Belgium. Arcadis is an international company providing consultancy, design, engineering and management services in the fields of infrastructure, water, environment and buildings.

He was Chairman of the Board of Directors of Belgacom, now Proximus Group (2004–2012), and member of the board (2004–2015). He joined the Advisory Board of Waterland Private Equity Investments on 1 January 2005. He was Belgian Manager of the Year in 2001. Theo Dilissen was a member of VOKA (Flemish employers association) and of UZA (Antwerp University Hospital). Since 2006, he was the president of the Antwerp World Diamond Centre. Theo Dilissen died, aged 62, on 28 June 2016.

As a basketball player, he was selected 35 times for the Belgian National Basketball Team.

== Bibliography ==
- Theo Dilissen, Making Knowledge, 2005
