= Alexander Litaay =

Indonesian diplomat

Alexander Litaay (October 1, 1948 – June 26, 2016) was an Indonesian diplomat who served as Ambassador to Croatia from March 2016 until his death in June 2016.

Born in Ambon, Litaay was married to Usi Poppy and had three children: Natasya Alexandra Litaay, Adventya Zamyra Litaay, and Thomas Mandela Demokrasio Litaay. He was appointed Ambassador to Croatia in March 2016. However, he suffered a heart attack and stroke on April 23, 2016, soon after arriving in Croatia. Litaay remained in a coma from April 25, two days after his stroke, until he died at a hospital in Zagreb, Croatia, on June 26, 2016, at the age of 67.
