= Hamza Ali =

British Pakistani cricketer (1995–2016)

Personal information
- Full name: Hamza Sultan Ali
- Born: 5 August 1995; Bristol, England
- Died: 9 June 2016 (aged 20); Bristol, England
- Batting: Right-handed
- Bowling: Right-arm medium-fast

Domestic team information
- Years: Team
- 2015–2016: Rawalpindi Rams
- 2016: Hampshire
- Only First-class: 4 April 2016 Hampshire v Cardiff MCCU
- List A debut: 19 January 2015 Rawalpindi v National Bank
- Last List A: 22 January 2016 Rawalpindi v FATA

Career statistics
Competition	First-class	List A
Matches	1	6
Runs scored	–	24
Batting average	–	6.00
100s/50s	–/–	0/0
Top score	–	13
Balls bowled	102	260
Wickets	2	10
Bowling average	29.50	25.90
5 wickets in innings	0	0
10 wickets in match	0	0
Best bowling	2/47	3/39
Catches/stumpings	1/–	2/–
- Source: CricketArchive, 9 June 2016

Hamza Sultan Ali (8 August 1995 – 9 June 2016), also known as Hamza Shabbir, was a British Pakistani cricketer who played for Hampshire, Marylebone Cricket Club (MCC) Young Cricketers and Rawalpindi Rams. Primarily a right-arm fast-medium bowler, he also batted right handed. Ali attended City Academy Bristol and Filton Sixth Form College.

== Career ==
Ali played for many years for Stapleton Cricket Club in the West Of England League Bristol and North Somerset Division; his step father also played for the club. In 2016, he represented Downend Cricket Club, where he was known as one of the fastest bowlers in the Bristol leagues. During 2015, Ali also represented Omar Associates in the Patron's Trophy Grade II. He made his List A debut in 2014/15 for Rawalpindi Rams against National Bank of Pakistan; Ali took 4/39 from 8.3 overs. In the 2015 season, Ali made two appearances for Hampshire Second XI, and he made his first-class debut in April 2016 in a pre-season match for Hampshire against Cardiff MCCU, taking 2/47. Ali also represented the Marylebone Cricket Club (MCC) Young Cricketers, with his last appearance for them being in a Second XI Championship match against Sussex Second XI; Ali scored 44 and took 4 for 39 in the first innings of the match.

== Death and tributes ==
On 9 June 2016, Ali died at around 17:20 British Standard Time after drowning in the River Avon near Saltford Lock to the south-east of Bristol. He was 20 years old. Hampshire's Head of Player Development said of Ali that "He was an incredibly committed and enthusiastic cricketer who always gave 100% for the team that he was playing for", whilst MCC head coach Steven Kirby said that "He greatly impressed us with his energy, enthusiasm and exceptional all-round talent." In memory of Ali, Hampshire wore black armbands for their 2016 T20 Blast match on 9 June against Surrey, Downend players wore black armbands on their match on 11 June, and the flags at Stapleton Cricket Club were lowered to half-mast on 9 June.
