= Donald Jelinek =

American lawyer

Donald Jelinek (February 17, 1934 – June 24, 2016) was an American lawyer who defended civil rights workers from the Student Non-Violent Coordinating Committee (SNCC) in the South in the 1960s, and the Native Americans who seized Alcatraz Island in 1969.

== Early life and education ==
Donald Arthur Jelinek was born in the Bronx on February 17, 1934. His parents were immigrants to the United States. His father had a print shop and his mother worked as a secretary. He attended the Bronx High School of Science, and later obtained degrees from New York University and New York University Law School.

== SNCC ==
Jelinek left his job at a Wall Street law firm in 1965 and did pro bono work for the American Civil Liberties Union, defending members of the Student Nonviolent Coordinating Committee (SNCC). He stayed on after the summer, and in 1966 was arrested for practicing law in Alabama without a license.

He was director of the Southern Rural Research Project. In that role in 1968 he filed a lawsuit against the United States Department of Agriculture representing poor African Americans in Alabama. The suit demanded distribution of food stamps and surplus food in counties that were denying these services to the poor. The suit arose about of the work of the Southern Rural Research Project, which documented the extent of malnutrition in rural areas.

He stayed in the South for three years before moving to California. He remained connected to the civil rights movement and was a member of Bay Area Veterans of the Civil Rights Movement.

== Alcatraz and Attica ==
After moving to California, he represented the group of Native Americans who seized Alcatraz Island in the 1969 Occupation of Alcatraz. The Native Americans had claimed title to the island which belonged to the Federal government but was no longer being used. They claimed the island based on the terms of the 1868 Treaty of Fort Laramie. That treaty stated that unused federal land should be returned to its former native owners.

Beginning 1971, Jelinek coordinated the defense of the inmates charged after the Attica prison riot in New York. Litigation continued for decades, with inmates being eventually cleared of penalties.

== Later career ==
Jelinek also represented conscientious objectors during the Vietnam War. He served three terms on the Berkeley city council from 1984 to 1990. He ran for Berkeley mayor in 1994 and 1998 but lost both times. Working locally, he defended flea market vendors who were being evicted from the BART system parking lot, which they had originally used with the consent of the transport agency.

== Books ==
- Attica Justice: The Cruel 30-Year Legacy of the Nation's Bloodiest Prison Rebellion, Which Transformed the American Prison System. Berkeley, CA: Donald A. Jelinek, 2011. ISBN 9780970460714
- White Lawyer, Black Power: Civil Rights Lawyering during the Black Power Era in Mississippi and Alabama. Berkeley, CA: Donald A Jelinek, 2015. ISBN 978-0970460738

== Personal life ==
He married Estelle Cohen Fine while working in the South. Their marriage ended in divorce. He married Jane Scherr in Berkeley, and they remained married until his death on June 24, 2016. He asked that his epitaph read "he was part of SNCC."
