= Shirley Fenton Huie =

Australian writer

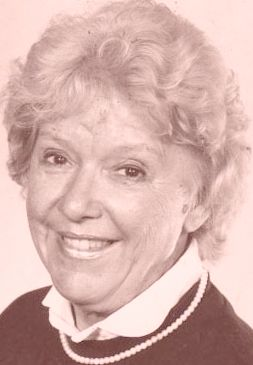
- Shirley Fenton Huie
- Born: Shirley Wanda Nonie Huie; 9 August 1924; Peak Hill, New South Wales, Australia
- Died: 23 June 2016 (aged 91); Canberra, Australian Capital Territory, Australia
- Occupation: Author
- Spouse(s): Russell Whiston Kerr, Edward Fenton, Denis Pile
- Children: Ceilidh Meribel Kerr, Thomas Finlay Whiston Kerr, Gina Fenton and Hereward Huie Atitlan Fenton
- Writing career
- Language: English, French, German, Spanish, some Indonesian
- Genre: Non-fiction
- Notable works: And the Second Prize is—Across Australia by Bus; Tiger Lilies; Someone Else's Country

Shirley Wanda Nonie Huie (9 August 1924 – 23 June 2016) was an Australian author. Her best-known published works are And The Second Prize Is—Across Australia by Bus, Tiger Lilies, The Forgotten Ones, and Someone Else's Country.

== Personal life ==
Shirley Fenton was born to a doctor, John Zeigler Huie, MB ChM, and Frances Georgina MacCormick at Peak Hill, New South Wales on 9 August 1924. A younger brother born in 1930, John Zeigler Huie, was the fourth to bear that name. Her early education was at the local school but her results were good enough to win her a place at the Presbyterian Ladies' College, Pymble in Sydney. She undertook her initial studies of French and German at this school. Her further education at the University of Sydney was interrupted by the outbreak of World War II and her decision to join the Women's Royal Australian Naval Service as a Wireless Telegraphist. Her knowledge of two foreign languages proved an advantage in this work.

In civilian life she met and married a former member of the Royal Australian Air Force, Russell Kerr. They moved to England in 1948 to live and had two children, Ceilidh Meribel and Thomas Finlay Whiston (later an osteopath). After their marriage dissolved and Shirley returned to Australia in 1954 with the two children, her former husband became a British Labour Party member of the House of Commons of the United Kingdom. In Sydney she met Edward Fenton, an American helicopter pilot who had served in Korean War, but who was working as an advertising executive. The family moved to a farm on Russell Island (Moreton Bay), where they grew bananas. Their daughter Gina was born during this time. Ed next accepted a contract to fly for helicopters in Colombia, South America. Later they moved to Honduras and Guatemala in Central America to work for the United Fruit Company spraying bananas. Their son Hereward Huie Atitlan Fenton (now the owner of the Truth News Web publication) was born in Central America. These years enabled Shirley to develop an excellent grasp of Spanish and to work as a translator. When the contracts ran out, the family moved to New Zealand.

When Ed obtained a contract to fly in Indonesia, Shirley returned to Australia where she opened an art gallery above her brother's wine bar in The Rocks, Sydney. With her two younger children she joined Ed in Balikpapan, Borneo and then Semarang, Java. After Ed was killed while flying in 1979, Shirley moved the family to Bali where she established the Legian Pub, serving tourists. However, in 1980 she needed to return to Australia to care for her elderly mother. During this time she wrote her first book, the text for a photographic essay by Bill Robinson called "Queensland's Sunshine Coast : then and now, 1882-1982". After Frances Georgina died in 1984, Shirley met Dennis Pile, a marketing and public relations consultant. When they moved together to Berry, New South Wales, Shirley took up writing in earnest, starting with "And the Second Prize Is—Across Australia by Bus".

She died on 23 June 2016.

== Writing career ==
Starting in the 1980s, she wrote ten books. For two of them ("Dancing with Unicorns" and "Twenty-one Days in Japan") Shirley prepared second editions, making a total of 12 books, and "The Forgotten Ones" was translated into Japanese. While "Queensland's Sunshine Coast : then and now" was her first as a collaborator "And the Second Prize is - Across Australia by Bus" was her first as an individual. In this book she describes her long coach trip around Australia, the result of a competition at a travel convention.

Her book "Someone Else's Country" was autobiographical. Her last book, "Heavenly Helicopters" (2008), featured a photograph of her late husband Ed Fenton with their baby son Hereward, taken in Honduras in the mid-1960s, on its front cover.

She donated eight boxes of papers associated with the writing of two of her books to the Research Centre of the Australian War Memorial.

== Bibliography ==
- Queensland's Sunshine Coast : then and now, 1882-1982 (1982)
- And the Second Prize is - Across Australia by Bus (1989)
- Tiger Lilies: Women Adventurers in the South Pacific (1990)
- The Forgotten Ones: Women and Children under Nippon (1992)
- Twenty-one Days in Japan, or, More "Forgotten" Stories of WWII: Searching to Understand the Riddle of Japan (1995, 1999)
- Dancing with Unicorns: a Love Story (1997, 1999)
- Ships Belles: the Story of the Women's Royal Australian Naval Service in War and Peace 1941-1985 (2000)
- Someone Else's Country: Living in Suharto's Indonesia (2003)
- Home to England: 49 Days to London (2005)
- Heavenly Helicopters (2008)
