= Rane Vaskivuori =

Rane Vaskivuori (1967 – 23 June 2016) was a Finnish designer whose best-known works include the Glowblow lamp (together with Vesa Hinkola and Markus Nevalainen), which MoMA New York has included in its permanent collection, and the Y umbrella and coat rack. He considered the Good Design Award granted by the Chicago Athenaeum in 1998 to be his best recognition.

Vaskivuori was a partner and founder of Valvomo Architects (Helsinki, Finland), who design interiors and products.
