= Alan Epstein =

American author

Alan Epstein (February 12, 1949 – June 20, 2016) was an American author. Epstein held a Ph.D. from NYU in European Studies. He wrote four books, including the travel book As The Romans Do (ISBN 0-06-093395-X), which was featured on The Oprah Winfrey Show.
