= Mohammad Kilani =

Jordanian politician

Mohammad Saleh Kilani (died 22 June 2016) was a Jordanian politician. He served as water minister in 1989.
