= Mustafa Zalmi =

Kurdish Islamic scholar (1924–2016)

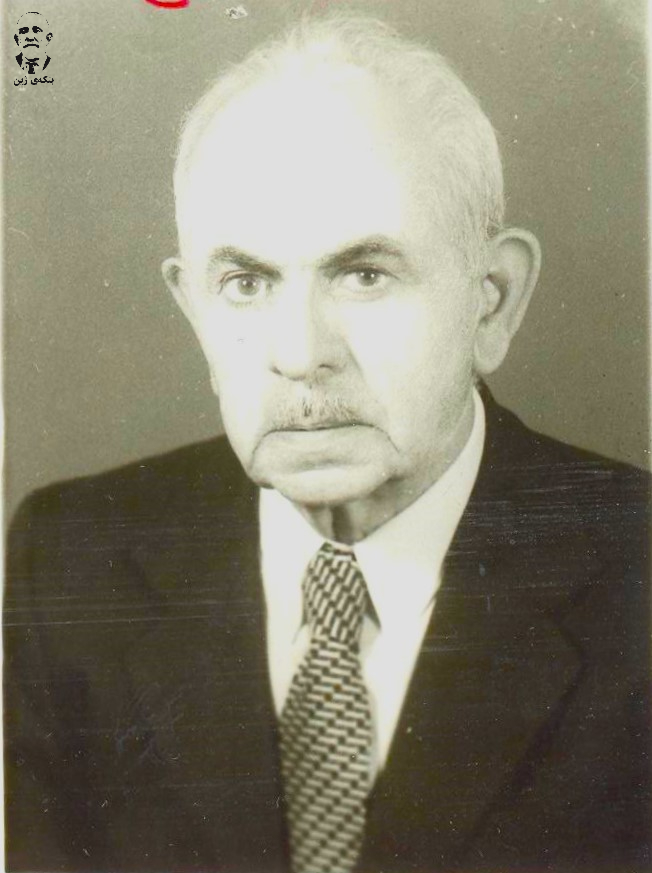
- Born: Mustafa Ibrahim Mohammed Amin; July 1, 1924; Iraqi Kurdistan
- Died: June 4, 2016 (aged 91)
- Occupations: Kurdish professor and expert in Islamic studies and Sharia law
- Title: professor

Mustafa Zalmi (Kurdish: مستەفا زەڵمی) (July 1, 1924 – June 4, 2016) was a Kurdish professor and expert in Islamic studies and Sharia law. Zalmi was born in 1924 in the village of Zalm in Hawraman in Sulaymaniyah province in Iraqi Kurdistan. He began to study in local religious schools in 1934 and has studied in both Iraq and Iran. He has finished his religious studies in 1946 in Koya city. Zalmi has received many significant certificates and awards throughout his life for his significant contributions to the Islamic and Sharia law. He is the author of more than 50 books many of which are being studied as the major curriculum in many universities in Iraq, Jordan, Indonesia, and Yemen. Zalmi has earned three master's degrees and three PhD's in Islamic studies and Sharia law. Zalmi has received more than 65 local and international awards in Muslim countries and his work on the interpretation of the Islamic and Sharia law are studied in Kurdistan, Iraq, Jordan, Turkey and Malaysia.

== Life ==
From the beginning of his life Zalmi had a lot of curiosity for education and studying. In the beginning of his youth Zalmi has started to study in his village Zalm in Hawraman. Then he has visited Iranian Kurdistan and Iraqi Kurdistan to reach many different scholars for education and self-improvement. After that he receives a certificate for finishing his education as a Muslim imam or scholar. In 1946 he also receives a certificate in Islamic studies. Then he goes into Iraqi army and serves as an Imam for the military troops in Jalawla town in the south of Iraq. Zalmi had a big impact of the Revolution of July 14 in 1958.

In 1959 he ended the study of the preparatory school, and in 1965 received a bachelor's degree in law at the University of Baghdad, and in 1969 received a master's degree in Islamic law at Baghdad University, and in 1973 received a master's degree at Al-Azhar University, and in 1975 he earned a PhD at the same university.

Professor Zalmi is one of the most popular professors of the law departments in the universities of Iraq. He was the first professor ever to receive a special command from the government under the rule of Saddam Hussein to stay as an active professor in the universities of Iraq and until the end of his life and not to retire from his work because of his excellency and success as a professor. Zalmi has contributed to the establishment of the curriculum of Iraqi universities in the fields of Law and Islamic Studies in all of the stages of the university. Four of his books are being studied as a part of the university curriculum from the first stage to the last in Law department. And one of his books is being studied for master's degree and one for PhD degree in law. His books are also been studied in Iraq, Jordan, Indonesia, and Yemen.

On June 4, 2016, he died in the Par Hospital in the city of Erbil and buried in his motherland near Khurmal town.

== Certificates ==
1. 1946 – Certificate of local religious school.
2. 1965 – Bachelor's degree in law.
3. 1969 – Master's degree in Islamic Law.
4. 1971 – Master's degree in Islamic Fiqh.
5. 1973 – Master's degree in law in Cairo University.
6. 1975 – PhD in Islamic Fiqh (Deep understanding of Sharia law).
7. 1981 – Assistant Professor in Baghdad University.
8. 1985 – Doctor (Dr.) in Baghdad University.
9. 1987 – Professor in Baghdad University.
10. 2005 – PhD in law in Baghdad University.

== Contributions ==
1. Zalmi is the Author of more than 50 books in the fields of Sharia Law and Law and has more than 40 scientific researches in the fields of Law and Philosophy.
2. Has supervised more than 100 letters and theses of masters and PhD's in the fields of Islamic Fiqh, Law, and Sharia Law.
3. Thorough out his life Professor Zalmi has been awarded and honored many times for his contributions.

== Sources ==
- The journey of my life. Author: Professor Mustafa Zalmi
