= Robert Clifford Pelletier =

American Businessman and Philanthropist

Robert Pelletier
- Born: May 8, 1933; Syracuse, New York, United States
- Died: June 23, 2016 (aged 83); Chattanooga, Tennessee
- Occupations: Entrepreneur, businessman
- Known for: Pioneer of financial market data and trading analysis

Robert Clifford Pelletier (May 8, 1933 – June 23, 2016) was an American entrepreneur and businessman. He was a pioneer of financial market data and trading analysis and the founder and CEO of Commodity Systems Inc.

== Early life ==
Pelletier had a background in statistics, probability theory, and analytical modeling, worked in the Advanced Analytical Methods Laboratories at the General Electric Co. in New York, and consulted for the US Navy in Hawaii under Planning Research Corp.

== Market data ==
=== Business ===
In 1969, Pelletier founded Commodity Systems, Inc., also known as CSI Data. The corporate headquarters were soon established in Boca Raton, Florida. CSI strived to provide clean end-of-day market data that was checked for errors. Pelletier said "If you’re testing data, you want it to be correct when you initially receive it” Pelletier was one of the first users of the Mitel SX-50 phone switching system, which he used to feed data to his customers from four Texas Instruments 990 microcomputers and one Convergent Technologies supermicrocomputer.

=== Perpetual Contracts ===
In 1970, Pelletier developed a continuous price series which was trademarked "Perpetual Contracts". It is a weighted average between two futures contracts. It provided a smooth series that was ideal for back-testing futures trading systems.
