= Allah Dino Khaskheli =

Pakistani classical singer

Jan Muhammad Khaskheli (died 24 June 2016) was a classical singer from Sindh, Pakistan. He was a son of Bachal Khaskheli, who was also a singer.

He was born on 25 January 1966 at Mirpur Bathoro. He received music training from his father. He has many albums of Sindhi songs to his credit. He sang poetry of Shah Abdul Latif Bhitai, Sachal Sarmast and others. He died in a road accident near Tando Allahyar on 24 June 2016. He was 50.

== See also ==
- Allan Fakir
- Shaikh Ayaz
