= Richard O. Linke =

American film producer

- Born: October 23, 1917; Queens, New York, U.S.
- Died: June 15, 2016 (aged 98); Hawaii, U.S.
- Burial place: Punchbowl National Cemetery, Honolulu, Hawaii, U.S.
- Occupation: Film producer
- Years active: 1960–1986
- Children: 3

Richard Oscar Linke (October 23, 1917 – June 15, 2016) was an American television producer. He produced over 200 television episodes between 1960 and 1986. Linke was Andy Griffith's personal manager for nearly 40 years and was a 25% owner of The Andy Griffith Show.

== Biography ==
Linke was born in Queens, New York, on October 24, 1917. He died at his home in Hawaii of natural causes on June 15, 2016. He graduated from Ohio University in Athens with bachelor's degree in journalism, and then worked for the Associated Press in New York City starting in 1941. He later went into public relations. In his later years he returned to Athens and taught at Ohio University for about a decade before moving to Hawaii.
