= Robert C. Beckham =

American politician

Member of the Georgia House of Representatives
- In office 1973–1978

Personal details
- Born: April 6, 1935 Darlington County, South Carolina, U.S.
- Died: June 10, 2016 (aged 81)
- Party: Republican
- Education: University of South Carolina

Robert C. Beckham (April 6, 1932 – June 10, 2016) was an American politician. He served as a Republican member of the Georgia House of Representatives.

== Life and career ==
Beckham was born in Darlington County, South Carolina. He attended the University of South Carolina.

Beckham served in the Georgia House of Representatives from 1973 to 1978.

Beckham died on June 10, 2016, at the age of 81.
