= Panagiotis Mavrikos =

Greek newspaper publisher

- Παναγιώτης Μαυρίκος
- Born: May 2, 1974; Greece
- Died: June 6, 2016 (aged 42); Attiki Odos, Greece
- Occupation: Newspaper publisher
- Known for: Publisher of Akropoli

Panagiotis Mavrikos (2 May 1974 — 6 June 2016) was a Greek newspaper publisher. He was notable for being the publisher of the newspaper Akropoli.

== Legal issues ==
Mavrikos was arrested in February 2016 along with two other journalists on charges of extorting advertising money from public companies, including the Athens water utility (EYDAP). He was released pending trial, denying any involvement in the blackmail scheme. Mavrikos was also linked to the Novartis bribery scandal, where he allegedly served as a liaison between the pharmaceutical company and high-ranking Greek officials, maintaining access to multiple Health Ministers.

== Death ==
On 9 June 2016, Mavrikos mysteriously died from a fire inside his Porsche. The fire originated from the gearbox, according to the experts that examined the remains of the car, discovering additionally a hole on the bottom of the cabin. Eventually the case closed in February 2018 without finding any criminal evidence, but attributed the break-up of the gearbox and the ensuing fire to poor maintenance.
