= Veijo Valtonen =

Finnish footballer (1936–2016)

Personal information
- Date of birth: 5 January 1936
- Place of birth: Käkisalmi, Finland (now Priozersk, Russia)
- Date of death: 11 June 2016 (aged 80)

International career
Years	Team	Apps	(Gls)
1960–1964	Finland	4	(0)

Veijo Valtonen (5 January 1936 – 11 June 2016) was a Finnish footballer. He played in four matches for the Finland national football team from 1960 to 1964.
