= Stuart Anderson (restaurateur) =

Co-founder of Black Angus steakhouses

Stuart Anderson (November 27, 1922 – June 6, 2016) was an American restaurateur and founder of the Black Angus Steakhouse restaurant chain, first established in Seattle in 1964.

== Early life ==
Anderson was born in Tacoma, Washington, and raised in Seattle in well-to-do circumstances. His father was a successful orthopedic surgeon during the Great Depression. Anderson would joke that his difficult circumstances included having to walk all the way across the Broadmoor golf course to school. He left Seattle to join the United States Army during World War II, driving tanks in General George S. Patton's Third Army, and returned to Seattle in 1949.

== Career ==
In Seattle after the war, Anderson bought a hotel, The Caledonia, in order to circumvent the state's blue laws and sell alcohol in the hotel bar which he called the Ringside Room. Anderson would later say in his book Here's the Beef! My Story of Beef that "Hookers, seamen, hustlers and wrestlers made up most of my trade." Around 1960, he opened a restaurant there and called it The French Quarter. In 1962, it was remade with a Klondike Gold Rush theme for the 1962 World's Fair and renamed to The Gold Coast. Finally in 1964 it was renamed again to Stuart Anderson's Black Angus before moving to Seattle's Elliott Avenue in the Denny Triangle.

Eventually Black Angus became a chain with over 100 restaurants which Anderson sold in 1972.

Anderson's 2,600-acre (1,100 ha) ranch in Thorp could be seen from Interstate 90, and was featured in commercials.

Anderson came out of retirement in Rancho Mirage, California to re-open a struggling Black Angus restaurant under the name Stuart's Steakhouse in 2010. It closed in 2012. He died from lung cancer at his home in Rancho Mirage on June 6, 2016, at the age of 93.

== Legacy ==
Anderson and his restaurants are credited with launching the western-theme restaurant concept (Ponderosa Steakhouse and Bonanza Steakhouse, Texas Roadhouse) and the careers of other successful restaurant businesspeople like Julia Stewart, DineEquity CEO.

His wife Helen said that despite his success in business, he could not cook steak, and "the best he could do would be peanut butter sandwiches or frying eggs".

Anderson was inducted to the Ellensburg Rodeo Hall of Fame in 2008 for his support.

== Bibliography ==
Anderson wrote two books about his life in the restaurant business. The second, Corporate Cowboy Stuart Anderson: How a Maverick Entrepreneur Built Black Angus, America’s #1 Restaurant Chain of the 1980s, was written in 2014 shortly before his death.

- Anderson, Stuart (1997). Here's the Beef! My Story of Beef. Seattle, Washington: Hara. ISBN 1883697948.
- Anderson, Stuart (2014). Corporate Cowboy Stuart Anderson: How a Maverick Entrepreneur Built Black Angus, America's #1 Restaurant Chain of the 1980s. San Bernardino, California: Stuart Anderson. ISBN 978-0692200636.

== Personal life ==
Anderson was married to Helen Anderson, née Fisher, from North Dakota.
