= Bernard Skinner (sailor) =

Canadian sailor

George Bernard Skinner (10 July 1930 – 16 June 2016) was a Canadian sailor who competed in the 1964 Summer Olympics. Born in Saint John, New Brunswick, he died in Montreal, Quebec.
