= John Love (scientist) =

- Born: 2 October 1942; England
- Died: 19 June 2016 (aged 73); Canberra, Australia
- Known for: Fibre optics, Optical waveguide theory
- Scientific career
- Fields: Photonics
- Workplaces: Australian National University

John Love (2 October 1942 – 19 June 2016) was a pioneer in the field of fibre optics, who co-authoring the widely used textbook Optical Waveguide Theory and was Emeritus Professor of guided wave photonics at Australian National University (ANU).

== Biography ==
Born in England, Love received a masters and DPhil in applied mathematics from the University of Cambridge and University of Oxford. He was a postdoc in San Diego and Toronto, before moving to Australia in 1973, where he became a postdoc fellow in ANU's applied mathematics department. He was a Life Member of the Australian Optical Society (AOS) and in 2009 received the most prestigious award of the AOS, the Beattie Steel medal.

As an Emeritus Professor at ANU he helped create the Wanda Henry Scholarship in Photonics. and later the Love Scholarship.

In 2015 Love cofounded the Australian company Modular Photonics.

== Publications ==
- Snyder, Allan W.; Love, John D. (1983–1984). Optical Waveguide Theory. New York: Chapman & Hall and Methuen, Inc. ISBN 978-0-412-09950-2.
