= Helen S. Lang =

Helen S. Lang (February 19, 1947 – June 20, 2016) was an American philosophy professor and researcher, specializing in ancient Greek philosophy and science, medieval and Renaissance thought, and an expert on Aristotelian natural philosophy.

For over twenty years she was with Trinity College, Hartford (1978–2003), where she was the Koeppel Professor of Classical Studies (named in 2001). Her last affiliation was with Villanova University, Pennsylvania, where she was Chair of the Philosophy Department (2002–2005) and a department member at the time of her death.

As a scholar, Helen S. Lang was a fellow at the Dibner Institute for the History of Science and Technology at MIT and at the Institute for Advanced Study in Princeton, New Jersey.

== Publications ==
Helen Lang wrote over three dozen articles and multiple book reviews.

=== Major works ===
- 1992: Aristotle's Physics and Its Medieval Varieties
- 1998: The Order of Nature in Aristotle's Physics
- 2001: (together with A.D. Macro and Jon McGinnis) an edition and translation of Proclus's De Aeternitate Mundi ("On the eternity of the world")
- 2015: (essay) "Plato on Divine Art and the Production of Body," (in B. Holmes and D.-K. Fischer, ed. The Frontiers of Ancient Science: Essays in Honor of Heinrich von Staden
- 2017: (essay) "Embodied or Ensouled? Aristotle on the Relation of Soul and Body," (in J. E. H. Smith, ed. Embodiment [Oxford University Press, forthcoming, 2017]
