= Annie Thayyil =

Indian novelist, journalist, translator and biographer

- Born: 10 November 1918; Chengaloor, Pudukkad, Thrissur, Kerala, India
- Died: 21 October 1993 (aged 74); Kerala
- Education: Holy Cross College, Tiruchirapalli; Maharaja's College, Ernakulam
- Occupations: Novelist; biographer; translator; politician
- Notable work: Christu Maricha Divasam; Kochammini; Molente Mon Ninte; Hungariyil Enthindayi?
- Spouse: Kurian Thayyil

Annie Thayyil (10 November 1918 – 21 October 1993), was an Indian novelist, journalist, translator and biographer of Malayalam language and a member of the Cochin Legislative Council between 1945 and 1948. Her oeuvre comprises 78 books covering the genres of novel, biography, politics, travelogue and biblical literature. She was the secretary of the Sahitya Parishad and a member of the executive council of the Kerala Sahitya Akademi.

== Biography ==
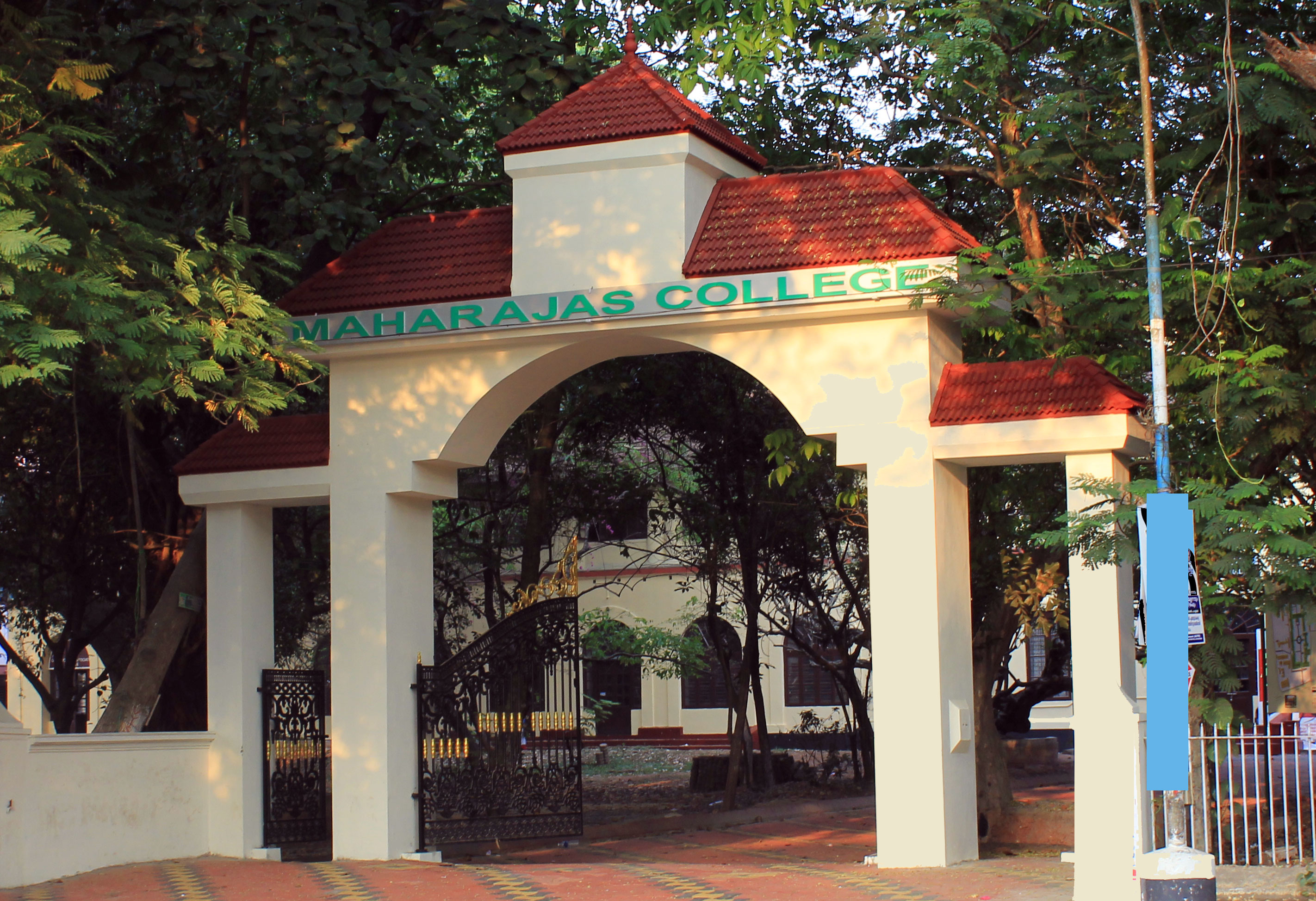
Maharajas College, Ernakulam, Thayyil's alma mater

Annie Thayyil, née Annie Joseph, was born on 10 November 1918 at Chengaloor in Pudukkad, in Thrissur district of the south Indian state of Kerala to Maliekkal Joseph and Mary. She completed her schooling from Sacred Heart Convent and St Joseph's Girls High School, Karukutty and Sacred Heart Convent Girls High School, Thrissur before passing the intermediate course examination from Holy Cross College, Tiruchirapalli. Returning to Kerala, she graduated in arts from Maharaja's College, Ernakulam and started her career by joining the Travancore State Service but quit the job in 1945 to successfully contest the polls to the Cochin Legislative Council; she won the seat again in the 1948 elections. She continued her political career during which she unsuccessfully contested three more elections, the 1964 election to the Rajya Sabha as an Indian National Congress candidate and the 1967 and 1970 elections to the Lok Sabha as an independent candidate supported by the Communist Party of India (Marxist). She also participated in the Vimochana Samaram of 1958–59 which led to the dismissal of the First E. M. S. Namboodiripad ministry. While pursuing a political career, she continued her studies to graduate in law and started practicing as a lawyer. In between, she ran a printing business in Kochi under the name Scholar Press, served as the secretary of Samastha Kerala Sahitya Parishad in 1960; edited two magazines, Vanitha and Prajamithram; sat in the National Commission for Minorities during 1984–85; and served as a member of the Central Social Welfare Board, Catholic Congress and the executive council of Kerala Sahitya Akademi.

Thayyil wrote 78 books covering the genres of novel, biography, politics, travelogue and biblical literature, of which Molente Mon Ninte (Daughter is mine, Son is yours), which criticised the orthodox views prevalent among the Catholics, became a subject of controversy. She translated a number of classics of world literature such as War and Peace, Anna Karenina, The Count of Monte Cristo, Tess of the d'Urbervilles and The Holy Sinner to publish them as abridged versions, wrote the biographies of Lal Bahadur Shastri, Indira Gandhi and John F. Kennedy and published a number of travelogues based on her travels to Europe in 1957 and to Israel in 1971. She published a political commentary, Hungariyil Enthundaayi? (What Happened in Hungary?) and her work, Christhu Marcha Divasam (The Day Christ Died), is a work on the life of Jesus Christ, based on Biblical script. Edangazhiyile kurisu was the title of her autobiography.

Annie Thayyil, married to Kurien Thayyil, died on 21 October 1993, at the age of 74. The Directorate of Women and Child Development of the Government of Kerala have instituted Vanita Ratnam Awards, eponymous awards honouring Annie Thayyil, along with other notable Indian women such as Akkamma Cherian, Captain Lakshmi, Kamala Surayya, Rani Lakshmi Bai, Fathima Beevi, Mrinalini Sarabhai, Mary Poonen Lukose, A. V. Kuttimalu Amma, Sukumari and Annie Mascarene. The annual award recognizes excellence of women in various fields. One of the most prominent and notable great grand children of Annie Thayyil is Veena Mendez who is one of the 100 Women of Influence in Australia and founder of (https://www.womeninoilandgas.com.au)making waves with her contributions in the advancement of women in Australia and also making her strides in the Energy industry.

== Selected bibliography ==
- Annie Thayyil (1962). Onnu punchirikkan Part.1. Thayyil.
- Annie Thayyil (1969). Nammude moulikaavakashagal. K. Thayil.
- Annie Thayyil (1969). Aikyarashtra sabha. Kottayam: National Book Stall.
- Annie Thayyil (1970). Christhuvinte athbhuthangal.
- Annie Thayyil (1980). Valiyavareppatti chilathu. Ernakulam, Scholar Book Stall.
- Annie Thayyil (1981). Christhu Maricha Divasam. Granthakarthri.
- Annie Thayyil (1982). Sthreekal- Baibilil. Kottayam: Granthakarthri.
- Annie Thayyil (1985). Ammayum pathu makkalum. Kottayam, NBS.
- Annie Thayyil (1987). Bible anudina jeevithathil. Kochi: Cardianal.
- Annie Thayyil (1989). Mary Bibile-il.
- Annie Thayyil (1989). Velipaadu. Kochi: Ladies League.
- Annie Thayyil (1990). Oru nalla vaidikante katha. Kottayam: Anne Thayyil.
- Annie Thayyil (1991). Cheruppakkaar onnichu. Kochi, Scholar Publications.
- Annie Thayyil (1992). Pravaachakanmaar.
- Annie Thayyil (1992). Oru nimisham.

=== Biographies ===
- Annie Thayyil (1971). Joan of arc. National Book Stall.
- Annie Thayyil (1986). Indira Gandhi: the soul of India. New Delhi, Heritage.

=== Translations ===
- Annie Thayyil; Tr; Hardy, Thomas (1948). Tess. Kottayam, NBS.
- Caine, Hall; Annie K Thayyil, Tr (1954). Nithya nagaram. Kottayam: Sahithyapravarthaka Sahakaranasangham. ISBN 9780000102041.
- Annie Thayyil; Tr; Mansoni, Alexandra (1984). Oru penkuttiyum randu vaidikarum. Kottayam, NBS.
- Annie Thayyil; Tr; Dumas, Alexander (1985). Monte Cristo (Ed.4 ed.).
- Tolstoy, Leo; Annie Thayyil. Tolstoy kathakal. Kottayam: National Book Stall.

=== Memoirs ===
- Annie Thayyil (1990). Edangazhiyile kurisu: aathma katha. Kottayam, D C Books.

== See also ==
- List of Malayalam-language authors by category
- List of Malayalam-language authors
- Vanita Ratnam Award
