= Pappinisseri =

- Census Town
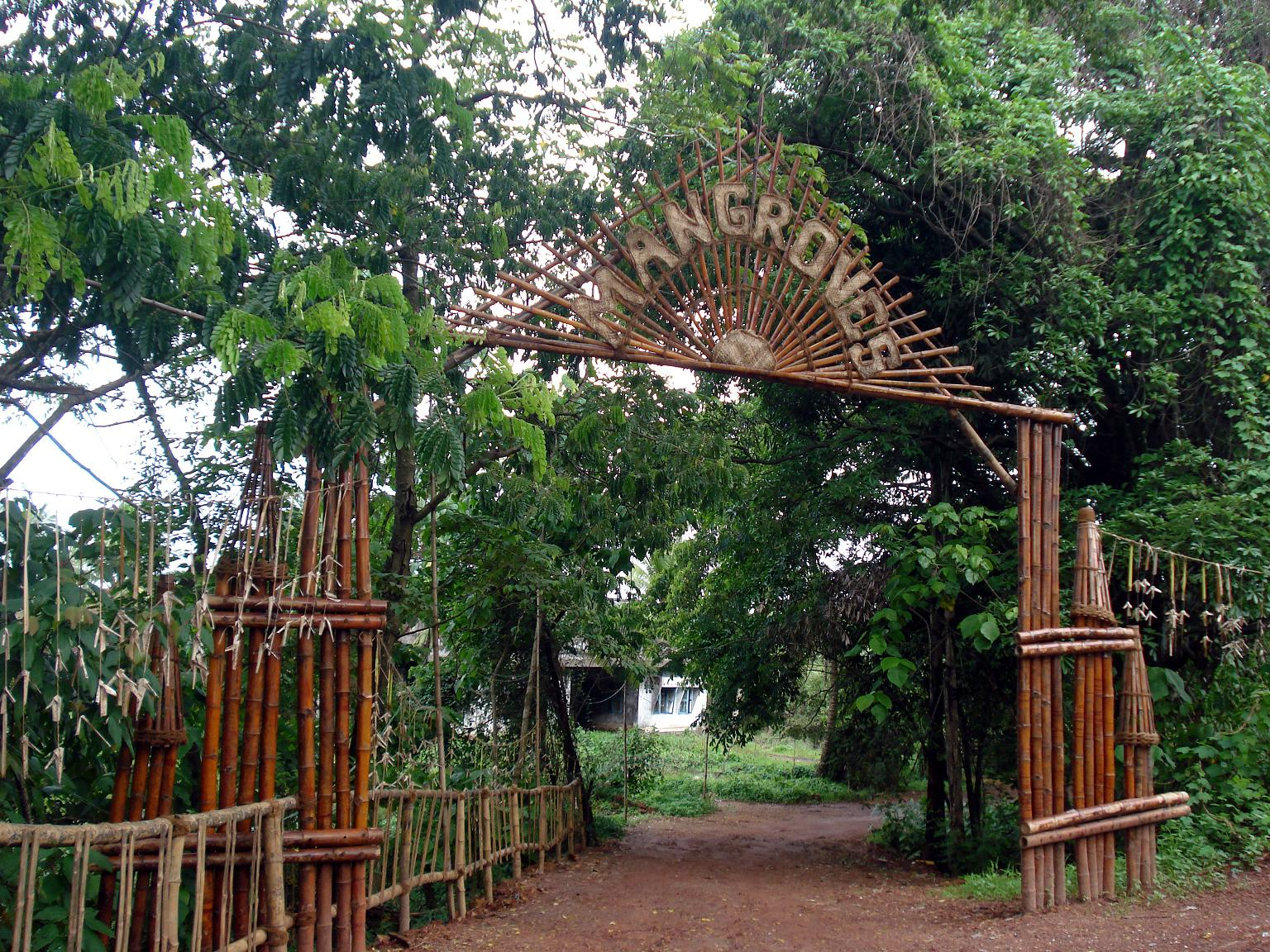
- Mangroves Park

- Location in Kerala, India
- Coordinates: 11.95°N 75.35°E
- Country: India
- State: Kerala
- District: Kannur

Government
  - Type: Panchayati raj (India)
  - Body: Special Grade Panchayat

Area
  - Total: 15.22 km^{2} (5.88 sq mi)
- Elevation: 1 m (3.3 ft)

Population (2011)
  - Total: 35,134
  - Density: 2,308/km^{2} (5,979/sq mi)
- Time zone: UTC+5:30 (IST)
- PIN: 670561, 670565, 670566
- Telephone code: 0497278
- ISO 3166 code: IN-KL
- Vehicle registration: KL-13
- Sex ratio: 1068 ♂/♀

Pappinisseri is a census town in Kannur district in the Indian state of Kerala. Pappinisseri Grama Panchayat has been recognized multiple times in the Kerala government's Swaraj Trophy awards for best-performing local bodies. It secured the third position for 2015–2016, and won the award consecutively from 2017–2018 to 2021. The panchayat was also declared the best Grama Panchayat in the state by the Government of Kerala. Pappinisseri Panchayat comprises two villages, viz Pappinisseri and Aroli. Pappinisseri is better known for visha chikitsa kendram (a treatment for snake bite).

== Geography ==
Pappinisseri is located at 11.95°N 75.35°E. It has an average elevation of 1 metres (3 feet).

== Demographics ==
As of 2011 Census, Pappinisseri had a population of 35,134 of which males constitute 15,988 (45.5%) of the population and 19,146 (54.5%) females. Pappinisseri census town spreads over an area of 15.22 km^{2} (5.88 sq mi) with 7,225 families residing in it. The sex ratio of Pappinisseri was 1,197 higher than state average of 1,084. In Pappinisseri, 11.3% of the population is under 6 years of age. Pappinisseri had an overall literacy of 95.5% higher than state average of 94%. The male literacy stands at 97.6% and female literacy was 93.9%.

== Religions ==
As of 2011 census, Pappinisseri census town had total population of 35,134 among which 18,155 (51.7%) are Hindus, 15,774 (44.9%) are Muslims, 1,136 (3.2%) are Christians and 0.2% others.

== Culture and geography ==
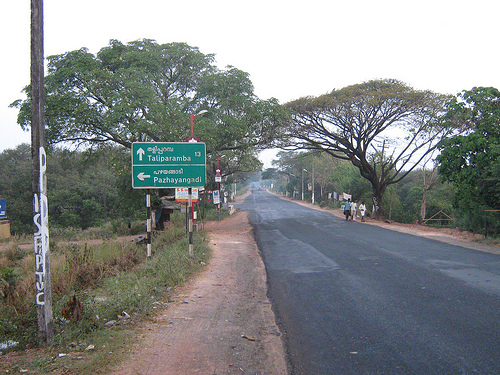
The National Highway at Pappinisseri

Pappinisseri Panchayat comprises Pappinisseri town and Aroli village. Two major roads viz NH 66 and KSTP Pappinisseri - Pilathara road. Pappinisseri panchayat is situated on the banks of Valapattanam River between Kannur and Payyanur on NH-66. Though the Pappinisseri village provides spaces for both of these major roads, Aroli is home for only NH-66. KSTP constructed Pappinisseri Pilathara road which act as a bypass towards Payyanur that reduces the distance and travel time between Kannur and Payyanur.

Major portion of Pappinisseri is surrounded by Baliapatam river which stretches from Mankkadav at the East to CRC at the West. Pappinisseri has many small islands and hills. Pampuruthi is a very famous islands in the Baliapatam river. Vadeswaram Hill, popularly known as Kailasam of Kerala, is famous for its scenery. Pappinisseri shares borders with Kalliasseri to the north-east and Valapattanam to the south-west.

Pappinisseri is a rail head (Nearest Major Railway Station is Kannur). Kannur International Airport is the nearest airport.

Pappinisseri is known for

- Moonnu Pettumma Palli
- Chittothidam Mantramoorthi temple
- Sree Vadeswaram Shiva Temple
- Aaron Church
- Assemblies of God Church, Pappinisseri
- Mankadavu Juma Masjid
- Keecheri Juma Masjid
- Keecheri Paalottu Kavu,
- Visha Chikilsa Kendram
- Tile Works,
- Cotton Factory
- M.V. Raghavan

== Visha Chikilsa Kendram ==
Pappinisseri Visha Chikilsa Kendram situated near Panchayat on NH 66 is very known for its versatile role in diagnosis and treatment for venom and poison threats to humans. This hospital was the first to accommodate Dialysis machine in North Malabar region. It is heard that nowadays this hospital has started its own antevenom production unit. Sree Kumaran Vaidyar and former minister M.V. Raghavan took keen interest to set up this hospital which is of first in its kind in this region.

=== Baliapattam Tile Works ===
This an ancient tile factory situated in Pappinisseri.

=== Western India Cottons ===
This an ancient cotton factory situated in Pappinisseri.

== Political violence ==
This area is an epicenter of political violence between RSS and Communists. CPIM and the RSS have been fighting in this area for supremacy for the last 50 years. Clashes in 2008 left seven people killed and many have been injured. The High Court of Kerala called this manslaughter a "compelling sport" and suggested permanent deployment of Central forces in the affected areas.

== Education ==
Pappinisseri has an average literacy rate of more than 90%. The schools in this area often score excellent position in state level examinations including scholarship exams.

The important schools of Pappinisseri are:

- Aroli GHSS
- Pappinisseri EMS Smaraka HSS
- Aaron UP School
- Aroli Central UP School
- Pappinissri West LP School
- Govt UP school Pappinisseri west
- Pappinisseri LP school

== Major industries ==
The major industries are:

- Cotton
- Tile
- Handloom
- Plywood
- Hand weave
- Milk production and marketing
- Co-Op Banking

The majority of the people of this villages depend on the income from Gulf Countries as well as the varied local industries.

== Transportation ==
=== By air ===
- The nearest Airport is Kannur International Airport to the east at an approximate distance of 33 km

=== By train ===
- Nearest major Railway Station is Kannur and other nearest Railways Station is Pappinisseri and Valapattanam.
- Two trains originating from Mangalore/Trivandrum and bound for Trivandrum/Mangalore, Ernad and Malabar express, stop at Valapattanam.
- All passenger trains stop at Valapattanam and Pappinisseri.
- All the trains runs through this line including New Delhi-Trivandrum Rajdhani Express, stop at Kannur.

=== By bus ===
- From Kannur :
  - 1) Board any bus going to Pazhayangadi for Moonnu Pettumma Palli and Western Part of Pappinisseri
  - 2) Board any bus going to Taliparamba for Keecheri and Eastern Part of Pappinisseri
  - 3) Board any bus going to Parassinikkadavu via Mankadavu for Aroli village area.
  - 4) board any bus going anchampeedika for keecheri village area

== Notable people ==
- Kandalottu Kunhambu, politician
- Margaret Pavamani, freedom fighter

== Mangroves Park, Pappinisseri ==
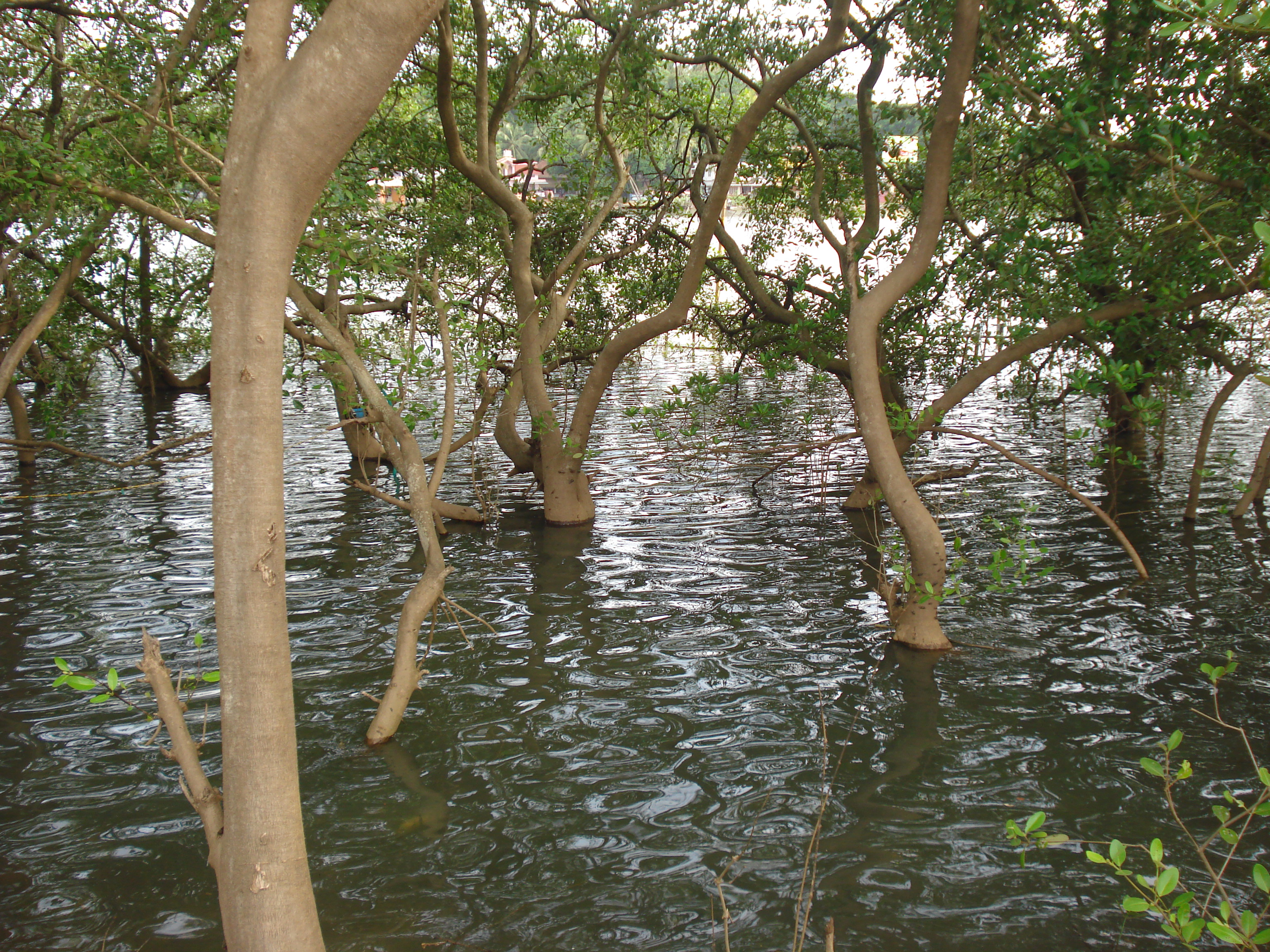

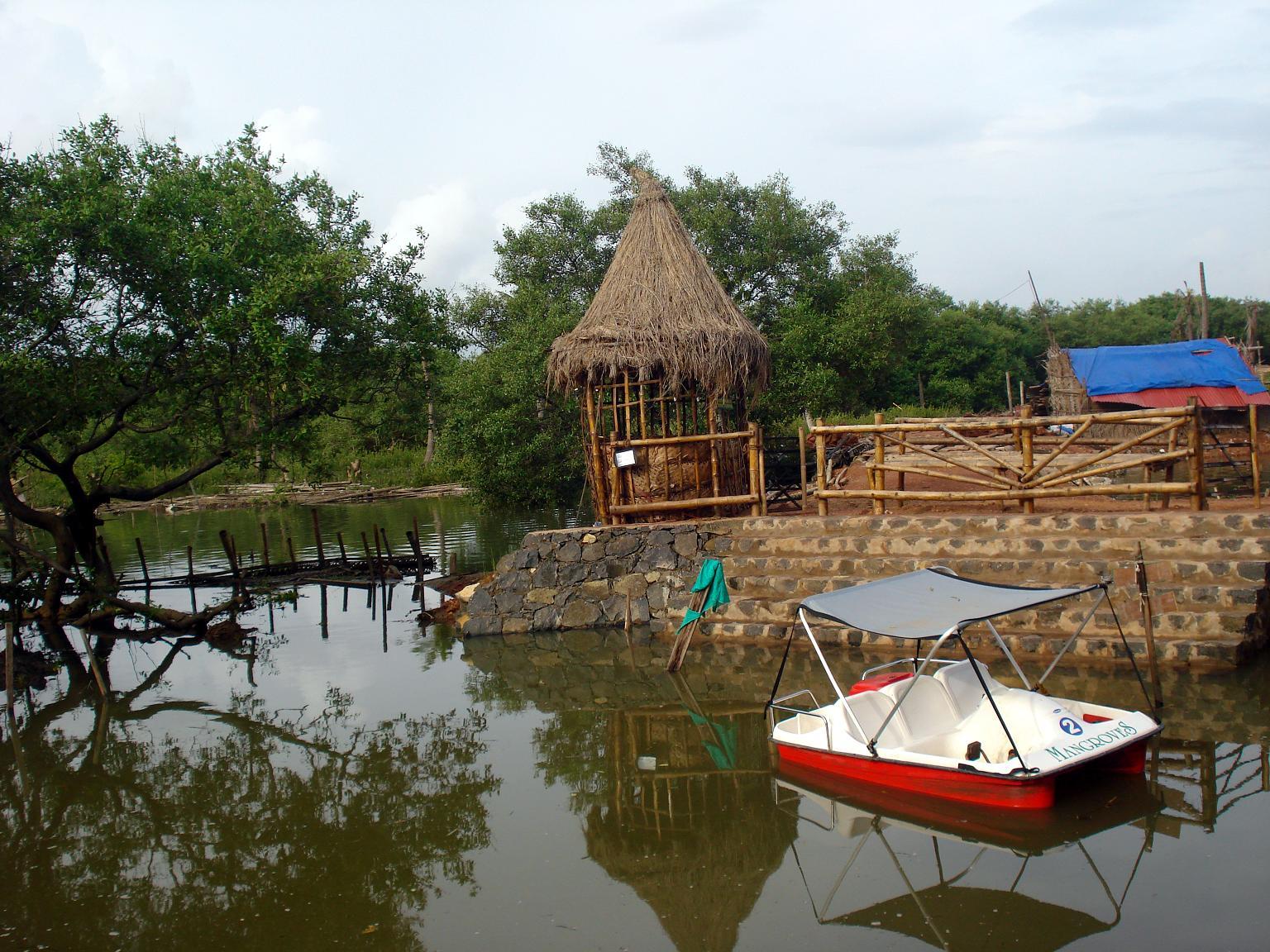

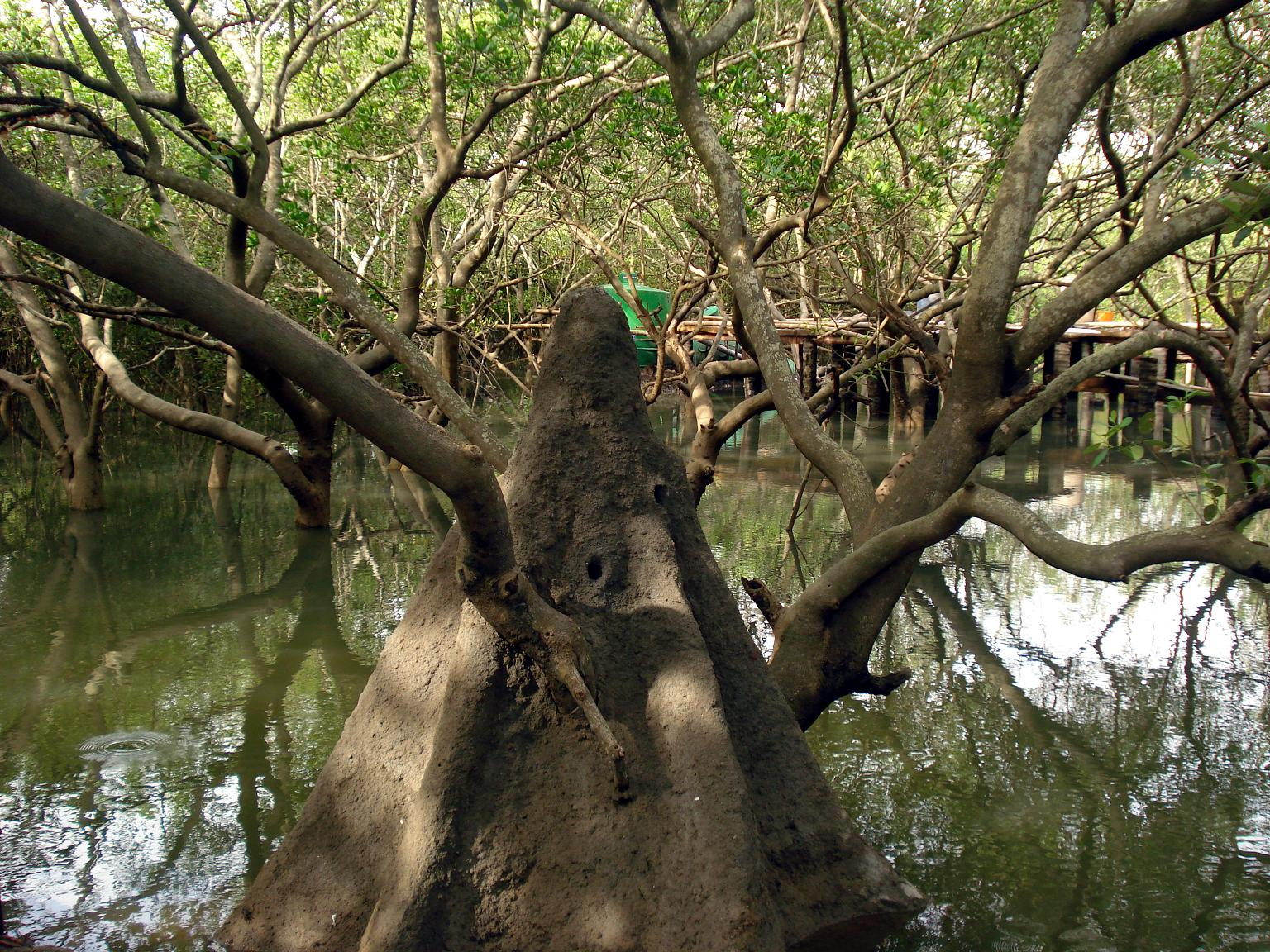

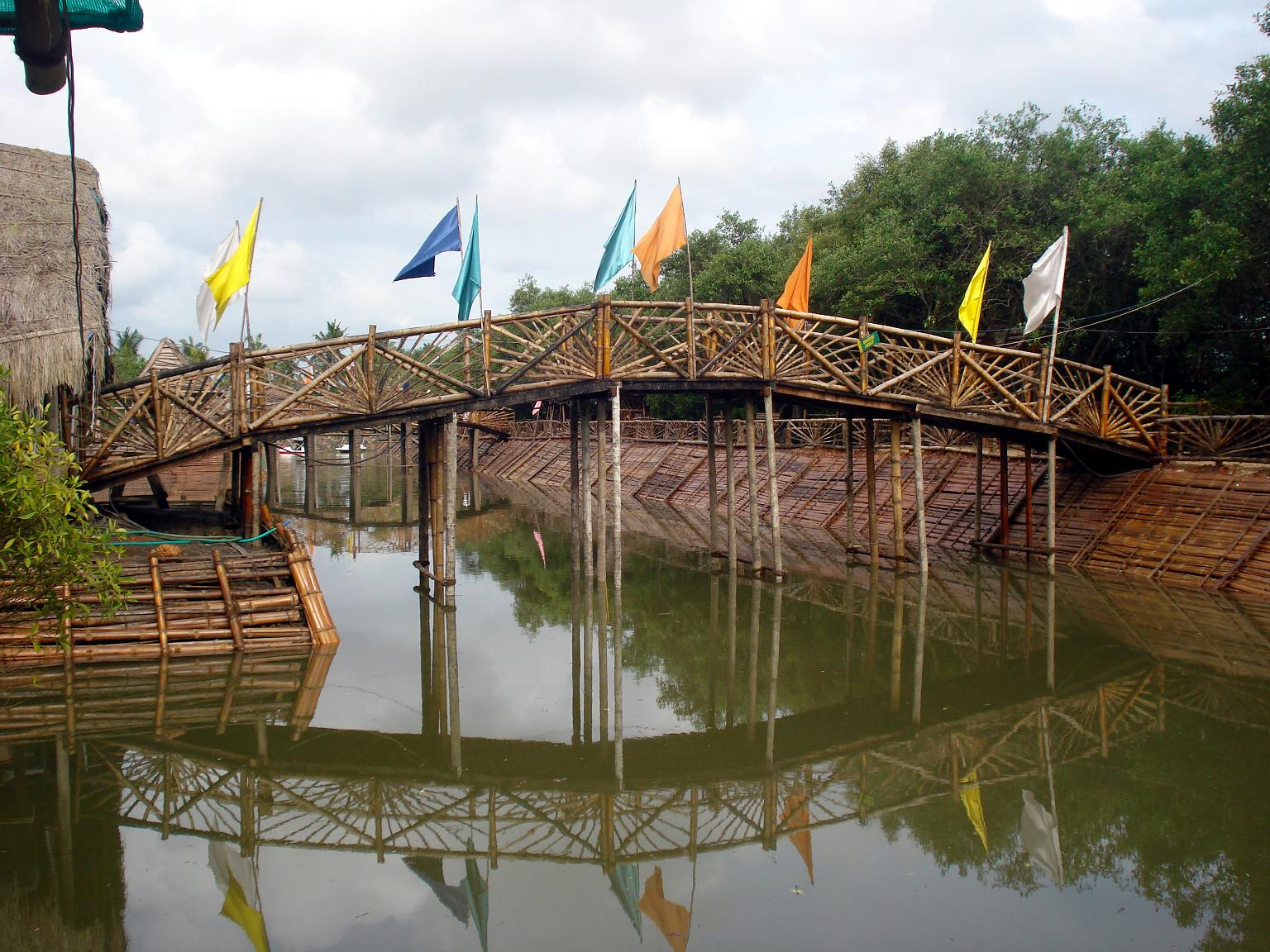

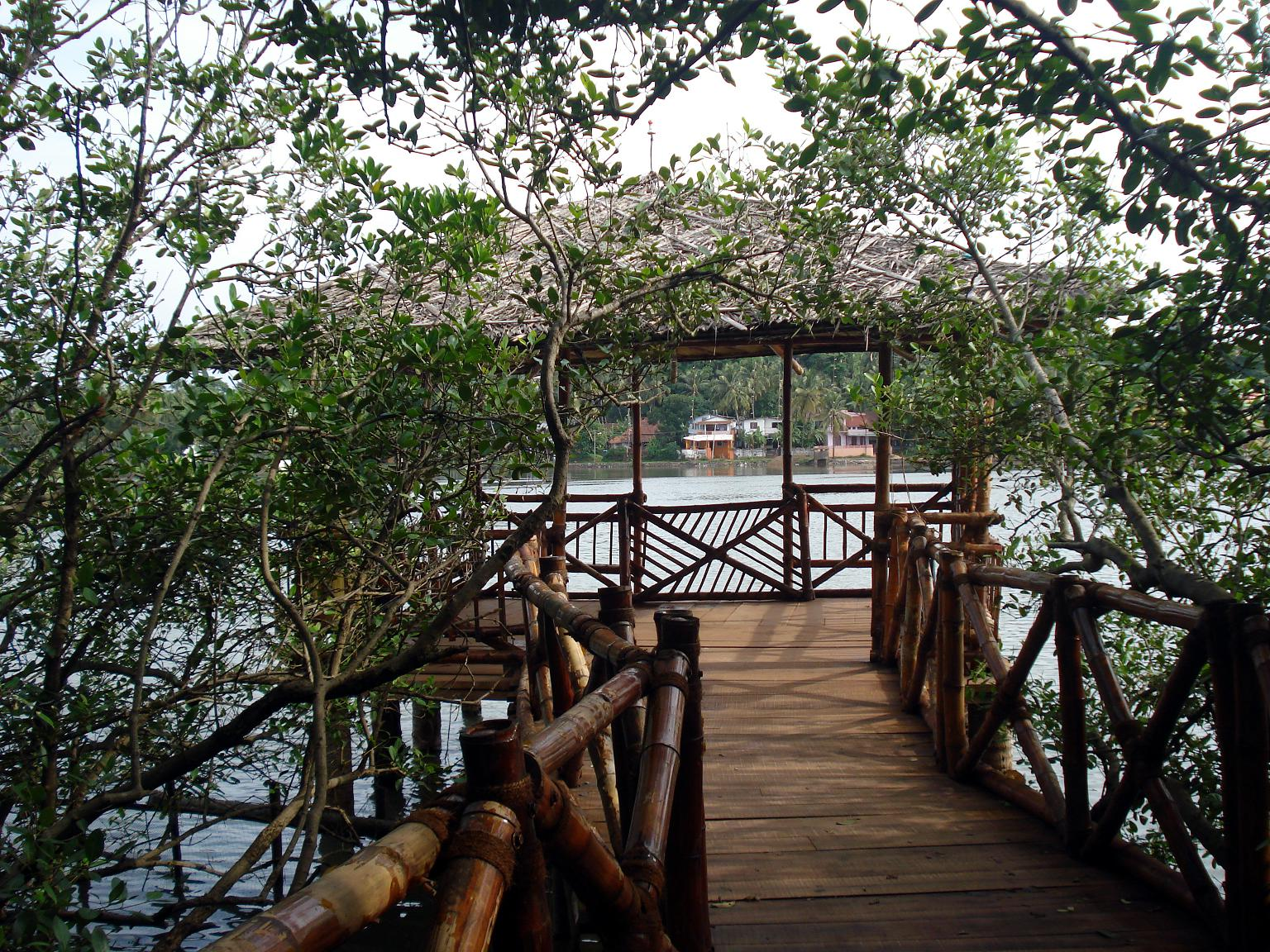
