= Vanita Ratnam Award =

Vanita Ratnam awards are the awards, instituted and given every year by the Women and child development department (formerly Social Welfare Department) of Government of Kerala to honor the women who excel in various fields of social service, education, literature, governance, science, arts and culture, health, media, sports, acting and women empowerment. The award which carries a cash prize of 300 thousand rupees each, was instituted in December 2013 and started to give away from 2014.

== Vanita Ratnam Awards 2016 ==
Vanita Ratnam Awards 2016
Name of award	Name of recipient	Field of Excel
Sheeba Ameer	Akkamma Cherian award	Social service
M Padmini Teacher	Captain Lakshmi award	Education
K. R. Meera	Kamala Surayya award	Literature
Sherly Vasu	Justice Fathima Beevi award	Science
Kshemavathi K S	Mrinalini Sarabhai award	Arts and culture
Sainu Philip	Mary Punnen Lukose award	Health
Leela Menon	Annie Thayyil award	Media

== Vanita Ratnam Awards 2017 ==
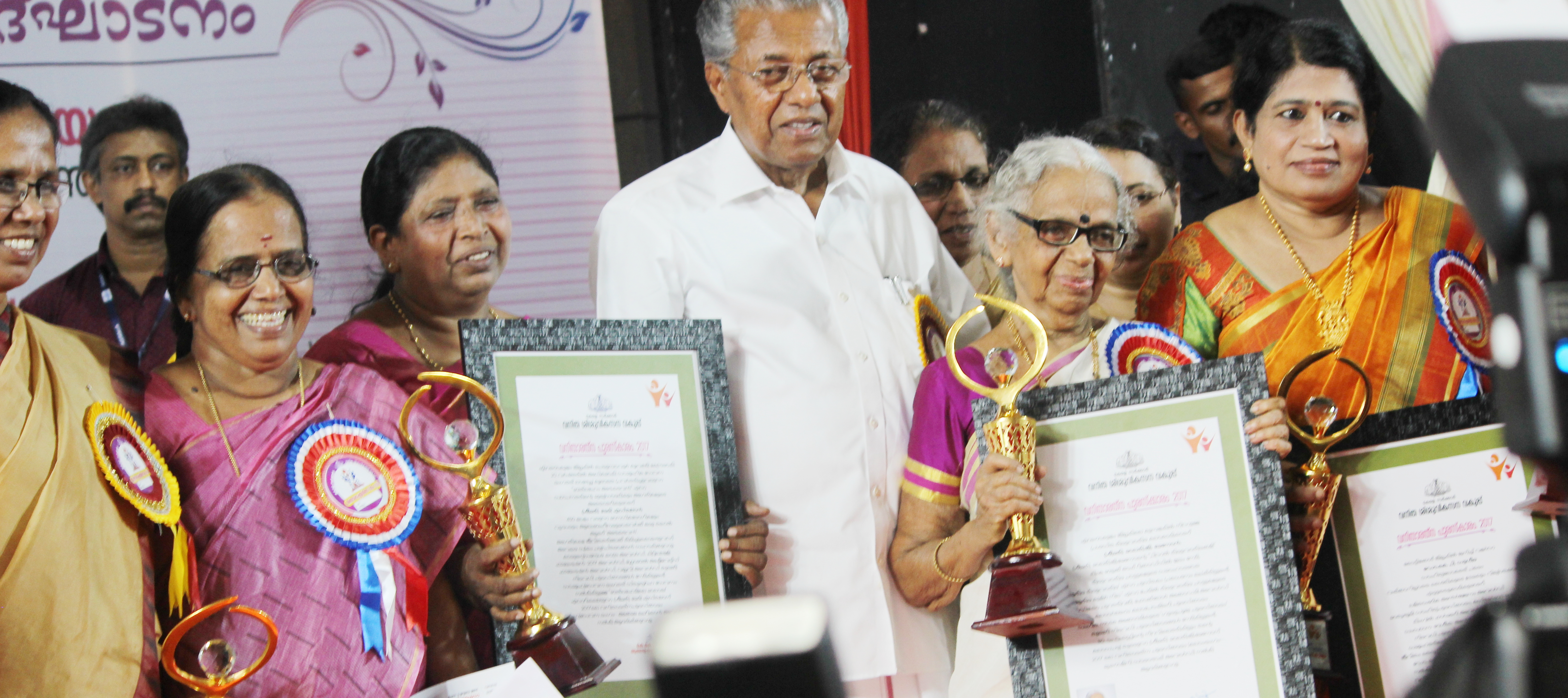
Pinarayi Vijayan, the Chief Minister of Kerala with recipients of Vanitha ratnam award 2017

=== recipients ===
The awards for the year 2017 was announced on 3 March 2018 for 11 personalities, each of them to be receive a cash prize of ₹ 300 thousand and a citation.

Vanita Ratnam Awards 2017
Name of recipient	Name of award	Field of Excel
Mary Esthappan	Akkamma Cherian award	Social service
Lalitha Sadasivan	Captain Lakshmi award	Education
K. P. Sudheera	Kamala Surayya award	Literature
Jagadamma	Rani Lakshmi Bai award	Governance
Mini M.	Justice Fathima Beevi award	Science
Malathi G Menon	Mrinalini Sarabhai award	Arts and culture
Sharmila	Mary Punnen Lukose award	Health
Krishnakumari A.	Annie Thayyil award	Media
Betty Joseph (Indian sports person)	Kuttimaluamma award	Sports
Rejitha Madhu	Sukumari award	Acting
Radhamani T.	Annie Mascarene award	Women empowerment

=== Award presentation ===
The Chief Minister of Kerala, Pinarayi Vijayan presented the awards for 2017 on 8 March 2018, at a function organized at V.J.T. Hall, Thiruvananthapuram, as part of the International Women's Day celebrations. The function was presided by the minister for Health and social welfare minister, K. K. Shailaja. The occasion was the first International Women's Day after the state government formed a separate department for women and child development.

=== gallery ===
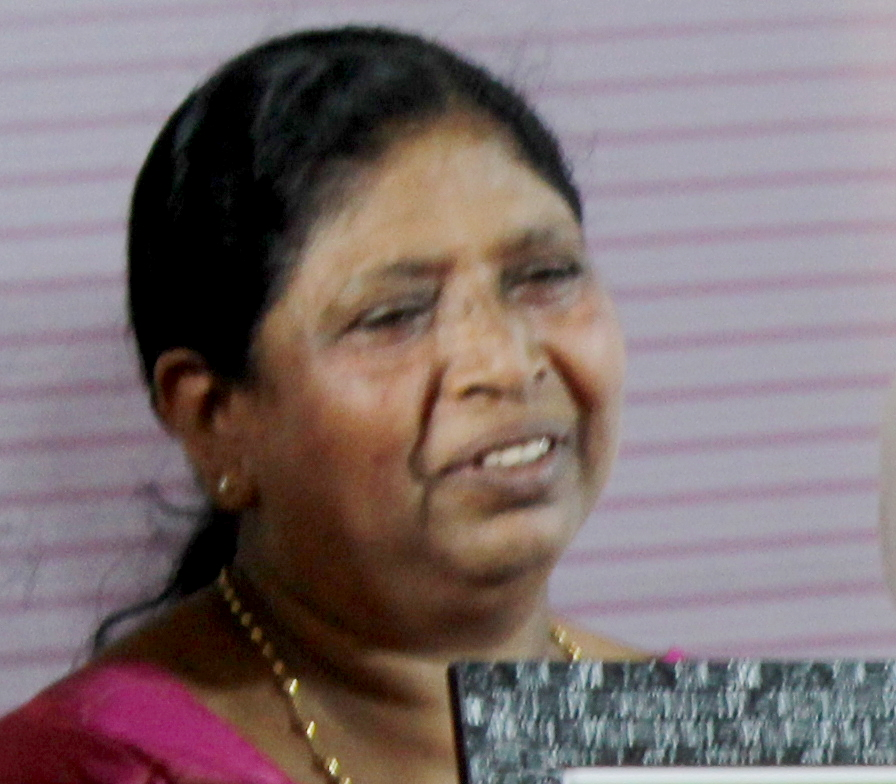
Mary Esthappan

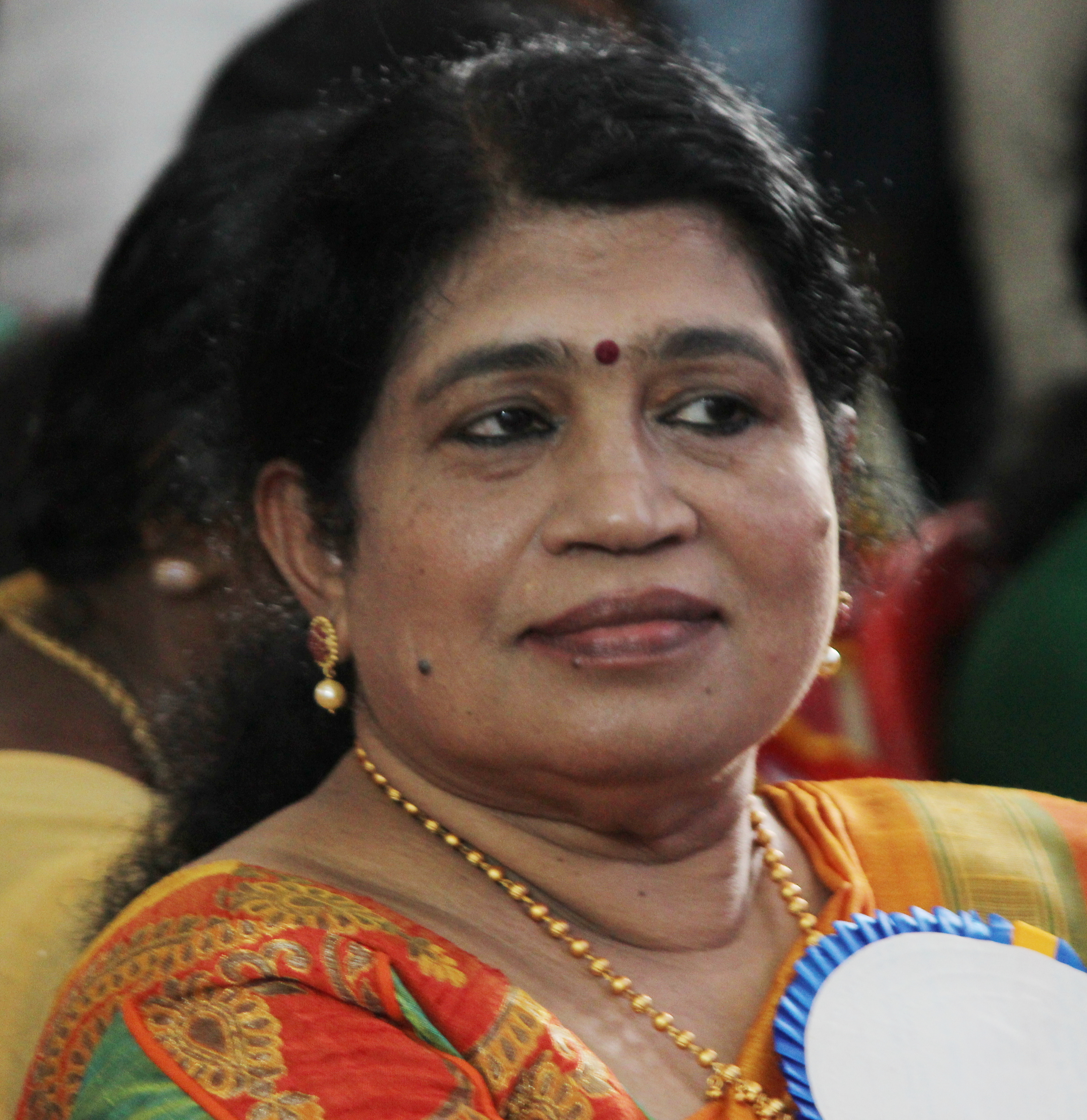
K P Sudheera

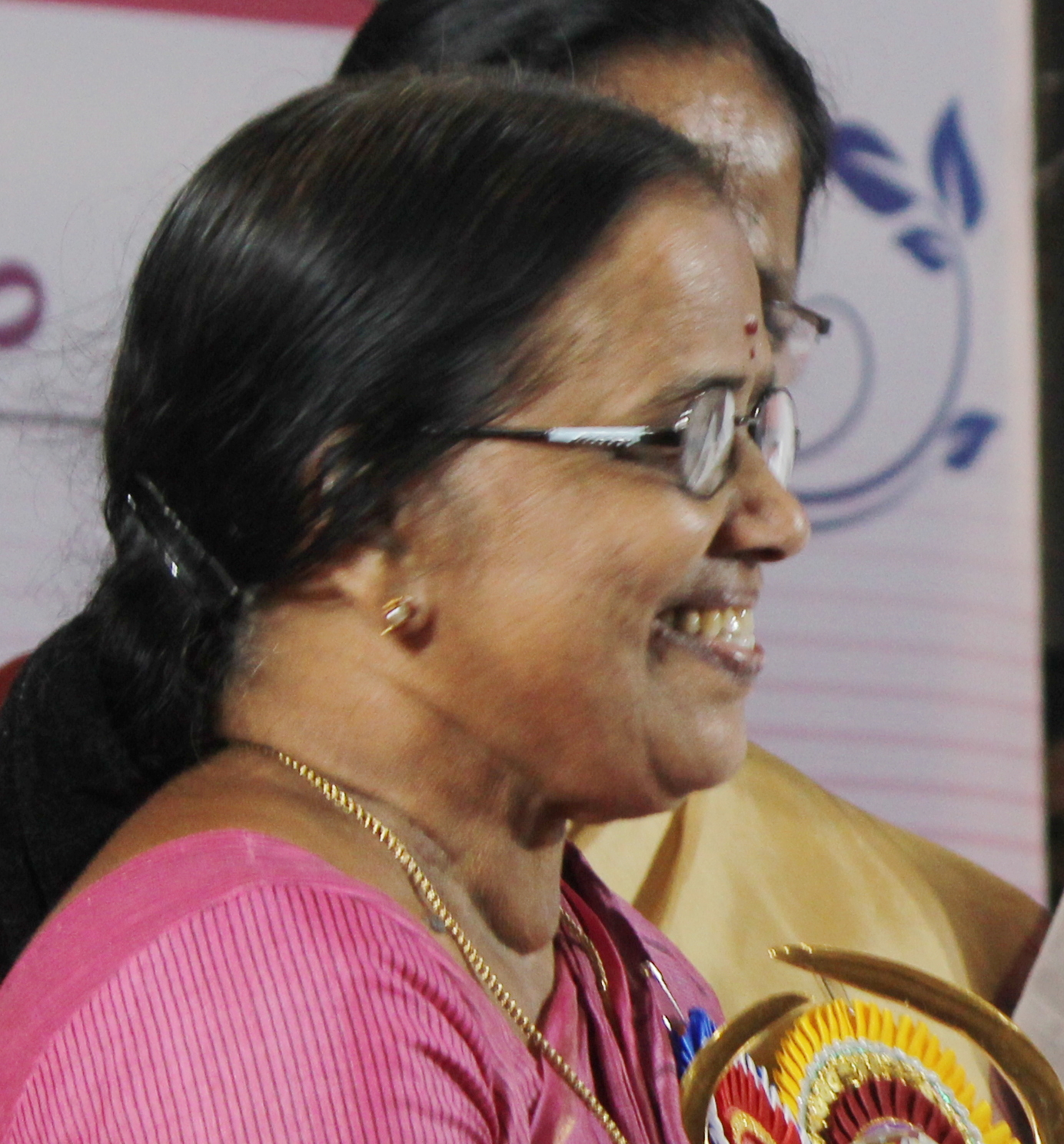
K Jagadamma

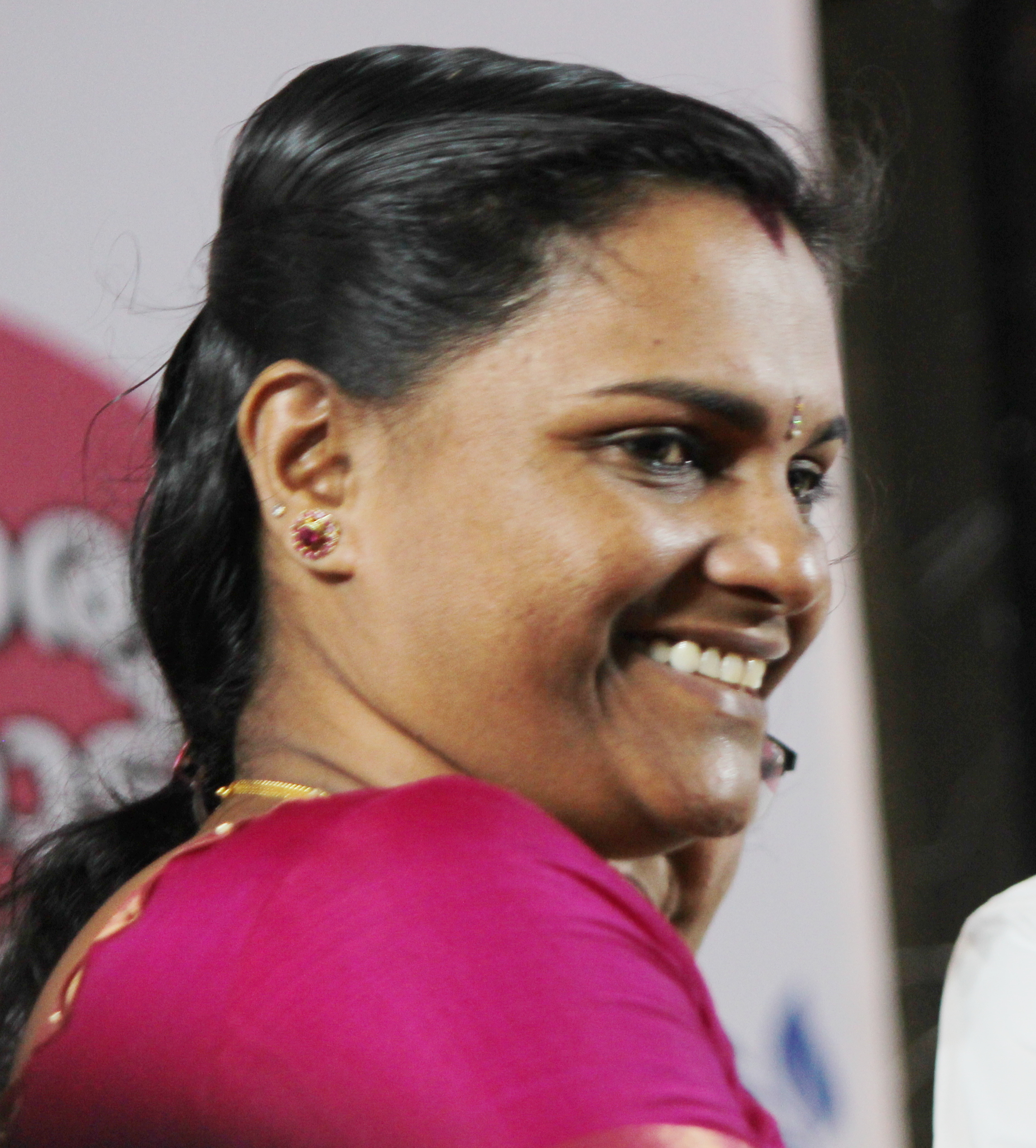
Dr.Mini

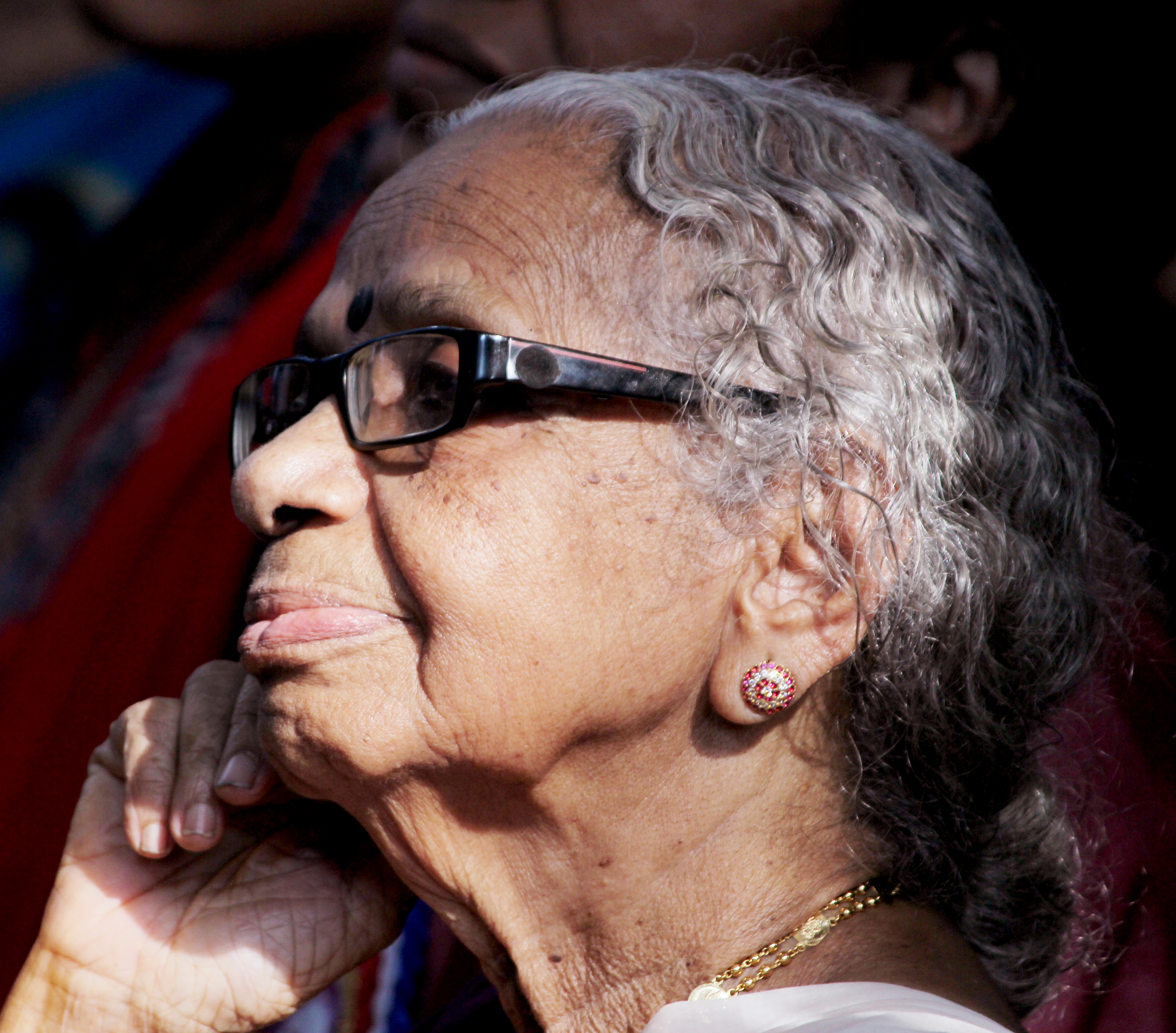
Malathy G Menon

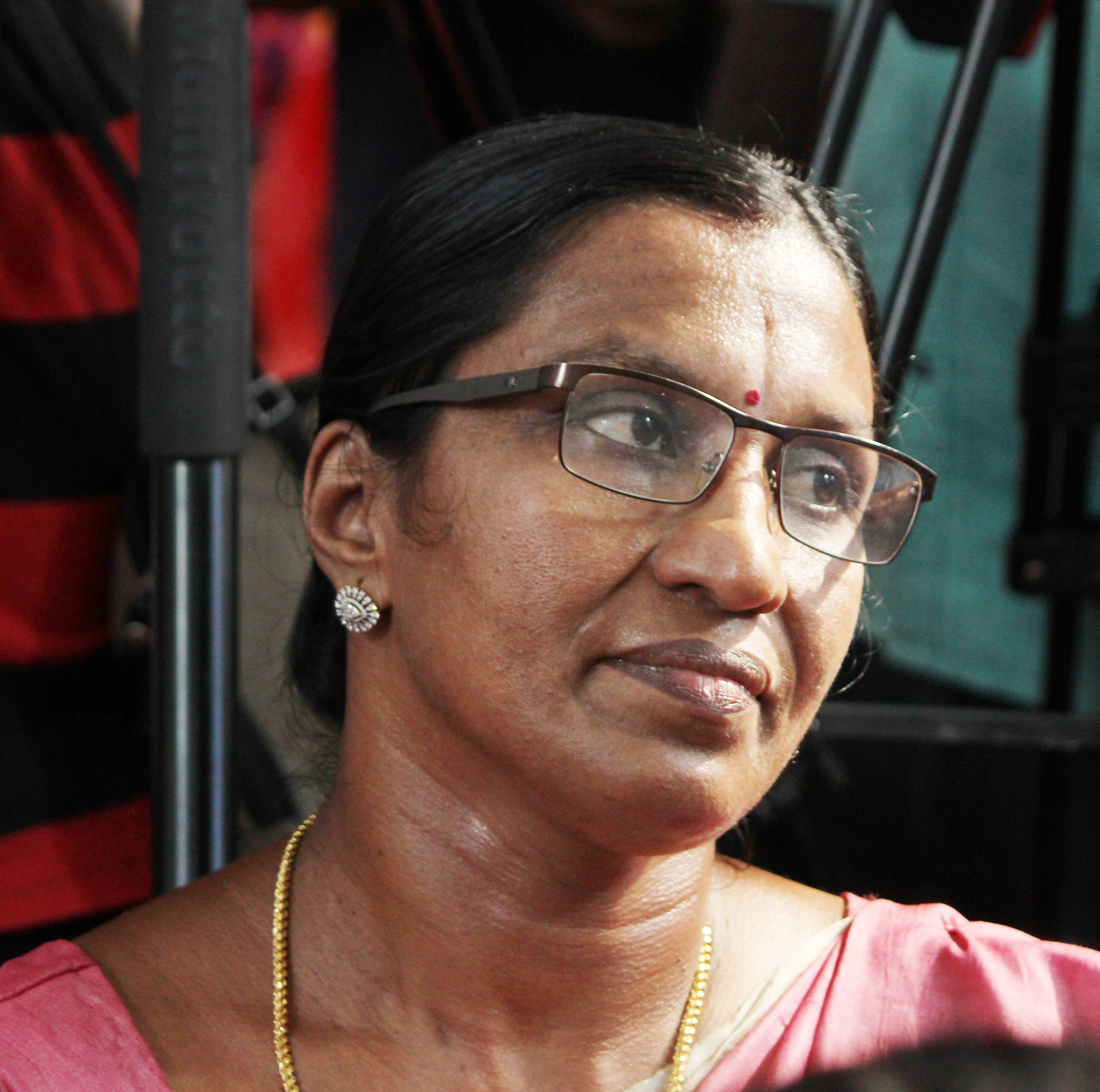
Dr. Sharmila

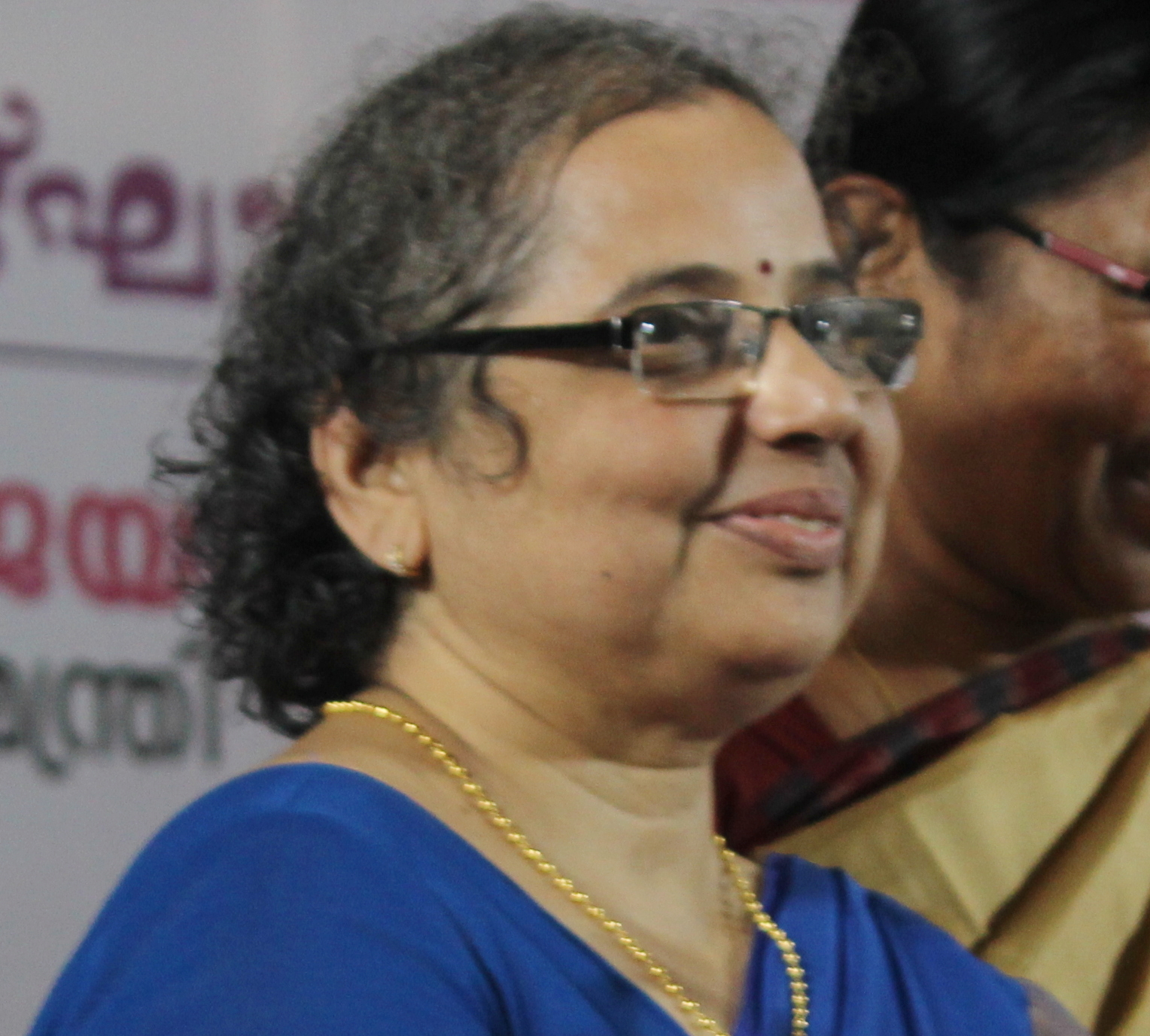
A Krishnakumari

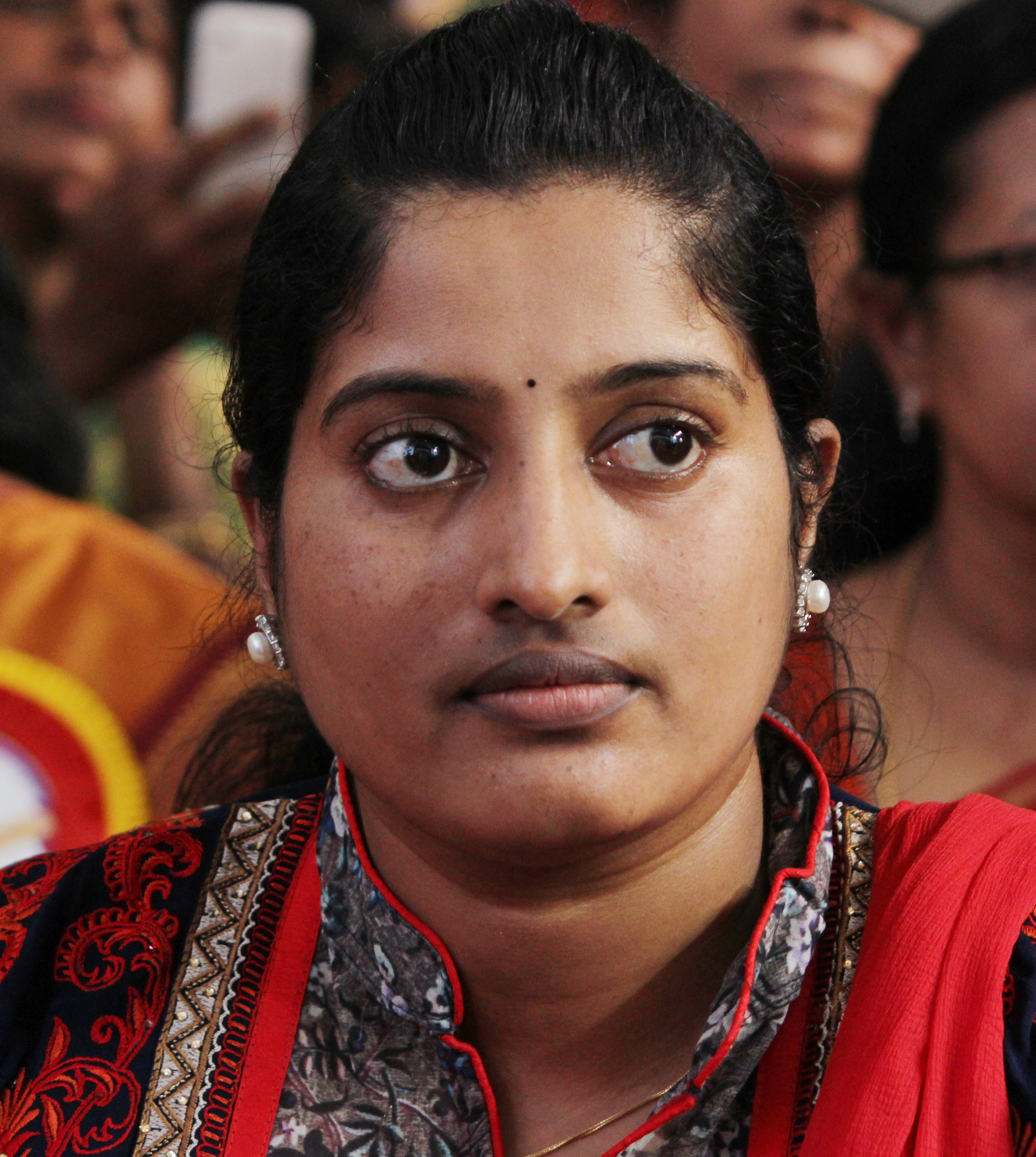
Betty Joseph

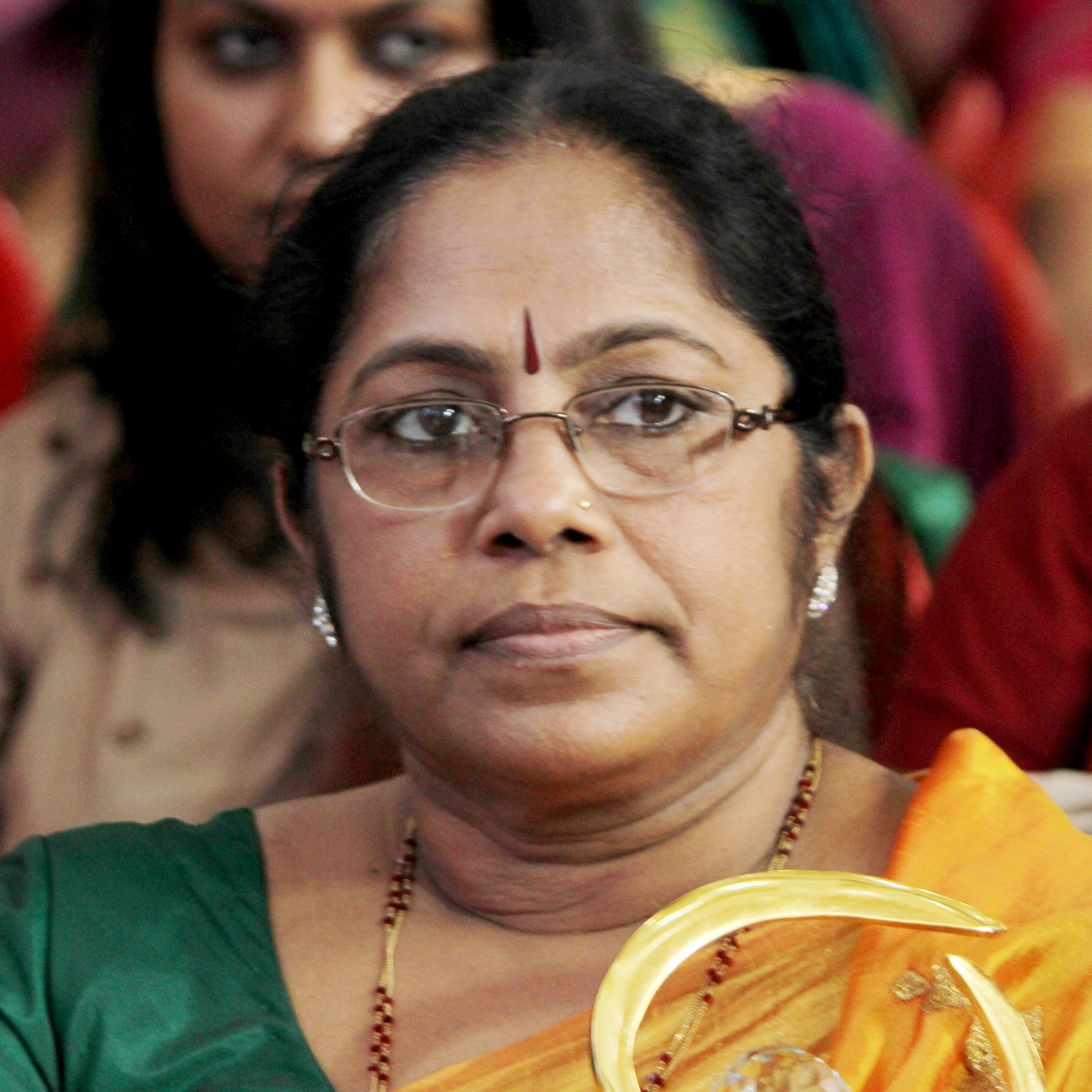
Rejitha Madhu

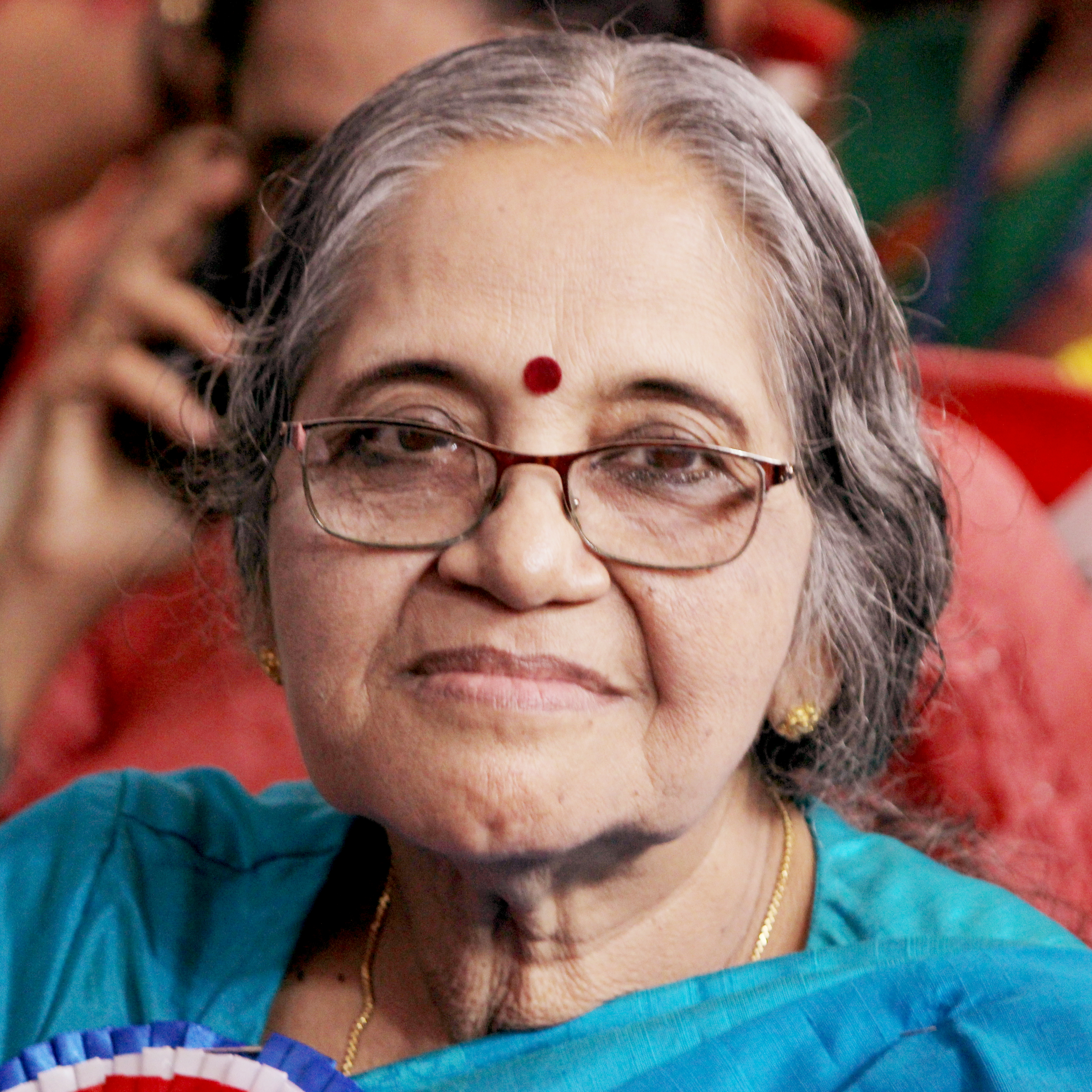
Radhamani T

== Vanita Ratnam Awards 2019 ==
The awards for the year 2017 was announced on 4 March 2020 by K.K. Shylaja, Minister for Health and Family Welfare, Kerala. The award will be given to 5 personalities, each of them to be receive a cash prize of ₹100,000 and a citation.

=== recipients ===
Vanita Ratnam Awards 2019
Name of recipient	Field of Excel	Details of selection
C. D. Saraswathy	Social service	..
P. U. Chithra	Sports	..
P. P. Rahnas	Survival	..
Parvathy P. G. Warrier	Empowerment of Women and Children	..
Vanaja Dr.	Education, Science and technology	..
