= Aroli =

- Village
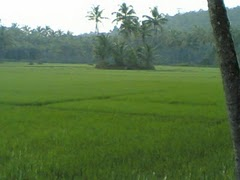
- View of Kurunthaaya Vayal from Vadeswaram

- Location in Kerala, India Aroli (India)
- Coordinates: 11.98°N 75.39°E
- Country: India
- State: Kerala
- District: Kannur

Government
  - Body: Village

Population (2001)
  - Total: 5,537

Languages
  - Official: Malayalam, English
- Time zone: UTC+5:30 (IST)
- PIN: 670566
- Telephone code: 0497278****
- ISO 3166 code: IN-KL
- Vehicle registration: KL-13
- Sex ratio: 1068 ♂/♀
- Lok Sabha constituency: Kannur
- Vidhan Sabha constituency: Azhikode
- Civic agency: Village

Aroli is a village of Pappinisseri Panchayat in Kannur district in the Indian state of Kerala.

== Geography ==
Aroli is located at 11.98°N 75.39°E. It has an average elevation of 1 metres (3 feet).

== Demographics ==
According to the 2001 India census, Aroli had a population of 5,537.

== Notable site ==
- Vadeshwaram Temple
