= Soumya murder case =

2012 case in Manjakkad, Shornur, Kerala, India

Soumya
- Born: Manjakkad, Shornur, Kerala, India
- Died: 6 February 2011; Thrissur city
- Occupation: Sales girl

The Soumya murder case is a criminal case in India regarding the rape and murder of Soumya, a 23-year-old woman from Manjakkad, while travelling in a passenger train from Ernakulam to Shornur on 1 February 2011.

== Background ==
Soumya, 23, and her poor family from Shornur, consisting of her younger brother and their mother, were eking their livelihood from the monthly salary being earned by Soumya at her job from an institution in Ernakulam. Once in a while, during holidays, Soumya used to go to her house at Shornur by the Ernakulam - Shornur passenger train, which leaves Ernakulam in the evening. During the course of her employment, she got acquainted with a young man employed at Ernakulam, who was the friend of some of her co-workers. They liked each other and he proposed to her. Both the families also concurred to have such an alliance and thereby decided to conduct a ceremony for fixing their betrothal at Soumya's home on 1 February 2011.

== Incident ==
The incident happened on train number 56608, Ernakulam Junction-shoranur Junction passenger train immediately after it left the Vallathol Nagar railway station. According to the prosecution, Soumya boarded the ladies division in the last compartment of the Ernakulam-Shornur Passenger Train, which left at 5.30 p.m., on 1 February 2011, to Shornur, from the Ernakulam Town North Railway Station. When the train reached Thrissur, most of the passengers in that ladies division got down. Another lady also who was present in that ladies division got down when the train reached Wadakkanchery. There, she got down at the platform, and got back to the compartment. At that time, she could notice the ogling by the accused, who was standing outside the compartment and by peeping through the window. When the train reached Mulloorkara, remaining passengers also got down there. As there was nobody else in the ladies division of that compartment, Soumya also got down along with them and hurriedly made an entry into the ladies coach attached just in front of that last compartment. The train reached Vallathol Nagar Railway Station, where it lay idle for some time.

The prosecution case is that the accused, Govindaswamy, who is a habitual offender, noticed that Soumya was alone in the compartment. When the train left Vallathol Nagar Railway Station and moved towards Shornur, the accused went into that ladies compartment, and rushed Soumya. The screaming Soumya frantically ran around in a panic, but due to the limited space available in the compartment, she could not escape. She resisted Govindaswamy's advances, but was caught and her head was forcibly hit repeatedly on the walls of the compartment. On sustaining fatal injuries, she became dazed and immobilized. Her loud cries and screams died down in the compartment. She was dropped from the running train down to the track. The side of her face forcibly hit the crossover of the railway line.

Govindaswamy, who was experienced in this type of crime, jumped down from the running train on the other side, rushed to Soumya, and took her to the side of the track where nobody could see. He then proceeded to rape her, ransack her belongings, and rob her of her mobile phone. He left Soumya's nude body behind.

There were two male passengers in the general compartment, which was in front of the ladies compartment, who had heard the cries of Soumya. Even though one of them wanted to pull the alarm chain to stop the train, he was dissuaded by a middle-aged man who was standing at the door by stating that the girl had jumped out and escaped; the man warned that he should not drag others unnecessarily to court.

Within a short span of 10 minutes, the train reached Shornur. Immediately, the two men rushed to a guard and complained about the incident, which triggered in the search of the track by some local men and the Gang-man of the Vallathol Nagar Railway Station. All of them engaged in a search at the railway track, and ultimately, by about 9.30 p.m., the mutilated body of Soumya was found at the side of the railway track where she was left. Soumya showed signs of life with movements of her right limbs. Blood was seen oozing out from the injuries on her face and head. The left side of her body had become paralyzed. They took the deceased to the Shornur-Thrissur road, from where she was then taken to the Taluk Hospital, Wadakkanchery. She was immediately taken to the casualty of the Medical College Hospital, Thrissur.

On the basis of the First Information Statement, the Cheruthuruthy Police Station registered a crime and C.I. of Police, Chelakkara, took over the investigation.

== Medical treatment and death ==
Surgical operations were done on Soumya, and all sorts of possible medical intervention and support were provided to Soumya. Despite that, her condition never improved, and Soumya continued to be on a ventilator in critical condition. By 6 February 2011, her peripheral pulses could not be felt. In the last consultation by the neurosurgeon at 14.30 on 6 February 2011, ECG was found to be flat line, BP was not recordable, and cardiac sounds were not heard. She was declared dead at 15.00 on that day.

== Postmortem report ==
Dr. Sherly Vasu, who was then working as Professor and Head of Department of Forensic Medicine, M.C.H. Thrissur conducted the postmortem examination of Soumya with the assistance of five other doctors. The opinion as to her cause of death mentioned in the postmortem report is as follows: "The decedent had died due to blunt injuries sustained to head as a result of blunt impact (injury no.1) and fall (injury no.2) and their complications including aspiration of blood into air passages (during unprotected unconscious state following head trauma) resulting in anoxic brain damage. She also showed injuries as a result of assault and rape. She had features of multiple organ disfunction at the time of death."

== Trial and verdict ==
Govindaswamy alias Govindachamy (known as Charley in TN police records as per Janam TV news). (aged 30, from Virudhachalam, Cuddalore district, Tamil Nadu) was found guilty in the rape and murder case of Soumya by the Thrissur fast track court judge, KN Raveendra Babu, on 31 October 2011. Govindachamy can be identified by the loss his palm on his left hand. Announcement of judgment had been delayed for 4 November since the Public Prosecutor submitted before the court the documents to prove previous convictions of the accused which showed that he had undergone imprisonment in eight cases in Tamil Nadu and Andhra Pradesh and trial of another robbery case was in progress. He was later given death sentence by the court. High court of Kerala upheld the trial court verdict in a 359-page judgement by the judges, T.R. Ramachandran Nair and B. Kemal Pasha.

Supreme Court (bench composed of Mr. Ranjan Gogoi, Prafulla C. Pant and Uday Umesh Lalit) set aside murder charges and altered to rigorous imprisonment for seven years under Section 325 IPC, stating that: "The death of the deceased was occasioned by a combination of injury no.1 and 2, and complications arising therefrom including aspiration of blood into the air passages, resulting in anoxic brain damage. The same, in the opinion of the doctor, had occurred due to the fact that the deceased was kept in a supine position for the purpose of sexual assault. We are of the opinion that the liability of the accused for Injury No.1 would not require a re-determination in view of the evidence. However, so far as Injury No.2 is concerned, unless the fall from the train can be ascribed to the accused on the basis of the cogent and reliable evidence, meaning thereby, that the accused had pushed the deceased out of the train and the possibility of the deceased herself jumping out of train is ruled out, the liability of the accused for the said injury may not necessary follow."

It upheld life imprisonment for the rape, stating "Having regard to the fact that the said offence was committed on the deceased who had already suffered extreme injuries on her body, we are of the view that not only the offence under Section 376 IPC was committed by the accused, the same was so committed in a most brutal and grotesque manner which would justify the imposition of life sentence as awarded by the learned Trial Court and confirmed by the High Court". All the sentences imposed shall run concurrently. The judges were Ranjan Gogoi, Prafulla Chandra Pant and Uday U. Lalit.

A. Suresan appeared for prosecution in the fast track court and High Court, and K. T. S. Tulsi in Supreme Court. B. A. Aloor appeared for the accused in all courts.

== Reactions ==
Former Supreme Court judge Justice Markandey Katju has said the Supreme Court must review its judgment in Soumya case, in which the apex court found accused Govindachamy not guilty of murder but only guilty of rape. "This is not a just punishment at all and it is hard for the public in Kerala to digest", Pinarayi Vijayan said. Law Minister of Kerala, A.K. Balan said people of the state were anxious and sad over the verdict delivered earlier in the day. Senior CPI(M) leader V. S. Achuthanandan said the verdict was 'shocking' and 'unfortunate'. Kaleeswaram Raj, a prominent lawyer in the Supreme Court and Kerala high court, felt that the verdict was shockingly soft and highly dispiriting. "With great respect, I may say that the punishment imposed by the Supreme Court is too meagre and has no deterrent effect. Also, it fails to satisfy the public consciousness. The court has rightly retained the maximum possible punishment of life imprisonment on the accused who is a potential threat to society. But the court could have done more than that. There were also other punishable offences which were not properly dealt with. Those included extortion, assault etc, which deserved separate jail terms", he wrote in the media.

In response, The Supreme Court Bench decided to convert that blog by Justice Markandey Katju into a review petition and asked him to personally appear in court to debate. On 11 November 2016, he appeared in the court and submitted his arguments. The Court then dictated the order rejecting the review petition and issued contempt of court notice to him stating that "Prima facie, the statements made seem to be an attack on the Judges and not on the judgment". On 6 January 2017, The Supreme Court has accepted Justice Markandey Katju's apology and closed the contempt proceedings against him.

== Review ==
The Supreme Court decided to hear the review petition filed by the victim's mother and the Kerala government, seeking review of its judgment. On 11 November 2016, The Supreme Court dismissed the review petition against the verdict discarding the death penalty for convict in Soumya's murder, stating that "the role of the accused in causing injury No. 2 by pushing the victim out of train is not free from doubt and the medical opinion is to the effect that Injury No. 1, by itself, was not sufficient to cause death."

== Curative petition ==
On 28 April 2017, a Six Judge Bench of Supreme Court has dismissed the curative petition filed by Government of Kerala stating that no case is made out within the parameters indicated in the decision of the court in Rupa Ashok Hurra vs Ashok Hurra & An. (2002).

== Prison escape and recapture (2025) ==
On 25 July 2025, Govindachami escaped from Kannur Central Jail where he was serving his life sentence, breaking out from Block 10 by cutting the iron bars of his cell with a makeshift tool. The escape was discovered during the morning cell inspection, with CCTV footage capturing his exit from the high-security facility that houses over 1,000 inmates. Police launched an extensive manhunt across the region, focusing their search on railway stations and bus stands. Later the same day, Govindachami was recaptured by police in central Kannur city, specifically from a house in Talap area, bringing the brief escape to an end.
