= Sherly Vasu =

Indian medical academic (1956–2025)

Sherly Vasu Dr
- Born: 5 July 1956; Thodupuzha, Idukki, Kerala, India
- Died: 4 September 2025 (aged 69); Kozhikode, Kerala, India
- Occupations: Medical academic Forensic pathlogist Autopsy surgeon
- Years active: 1982–2025
- Known for: Forensic science
- Notable work: Postmortem Table
- Spouse: K. Balakrishnan
- Children: 2 children
- Awards: Vanita Ratnam Award; TNIE Devi Award

Sherly Vasu, also spelt as Shirly Vasu, (1956–2025) was an Indian medical academic, forensic pathologist and the first woman forensic surgeon from the south Indian state of Kerala. She is reported to have performed around 15,000 autopsies during her career and was known for her contributions in solving a number of cases, Soumya murder case being one among them. She was the head of the department of forensics at Government Medical College, Kozhikode , former HOD and Principal at Government Medical College Thrissur and was serving as the head of forensic department at KMCT Medical College, Kozhikode when she succumbed to cardiac arrest on September 4, 2025. She authored a book, Postmortem Table, which details her professional experiences.

== Biography ==
Sherly Vasu, born in 1956, graduated in medicine from Government Medical College, Kottayam in 1979 and secured a post graduate degree in Forensic medicine from Government Medical College, Kozhikode in 1981. Subsequently, she joined the same medical college as a member of faculty of department of forensic medicine, thus becoming the first female forensic pathologist from Kerala, and later, was made the head of the department in 2001. In between, she had a short term of service at Pariyaram Medical College from 1997 to 1999 after which she returned to Kozhikode Medical College. In 2010, she moved to the Government Medical College, Thrissur from where she superannuated in 2016 after a stint of two years as the Principal of the college. After superannuation from government service, she joined KMCT Medical College, Kozhikode and was serving as the Professor and Head of the department when she suffered a collapse and died on September 4, 2025. She is survived by her husband, K. Balakrishnan, who is a medical doctor and their two children, Nandana and Nithin.

Sherly Vasu, who is reported to have performed around 15,000 autopsies during her career, contributed in solving many criminal cases such as the notorious Soumya murder case. She was the forensic specialist who examined the mortal remains of Safiya, the 14 year old victim in the 'Safiya murder case' which gathered public attention in 2006. She published her memoir in May 2025 under the title Postmortem Table, in which many of her professional experiences have been recounted.

== Awards and recognitions ==
In 1995, the World Health Organization awarded Sherly Vasu a fellowship which gave her the opportunity to get training in forensic pathology at University of London and Scotland Yard Police. She received the Justice Fatima Beevi Award for excellence in science, one of the Vanita Ratnam Awards of the Government of Kerala in 2016. She received one more award in 2016, the Devi Award of The New Indian Express.

== Books and publications ==
=== Books ===
- Vasu, Dr. Sherly (September 4, 2025). "Postmortem Table". Amazon (in Malayalam). DC Books (published 2016). ISBN 9788126420933.

=== Journal articles ===
- Noone, Padmini; Vasu, Shirly (2015). "Age as a Predictive Tool of Aortic value Dimensions- An Autopsy Based Observational study". World Journal of Pathology.
- Kumar, Badiadka Kishor; Vasu, Shirly (2010). "Victim profile and influencing factors in traumatic deaths on railways tracks in Calicut, Kerala". Medico – Legal Update. 10 (2).
- Noone, Padmini; Majid, M; Vasu, Shirly (2009). "Autopsy Findings in a Case of Tuberous Sclerosis". Journal of Forensic and Legal Medicine.
- Badiadka, Kishor Kumar; Vasu, Shirly; D ‘Souza, Deepak Herald (1990). "Artificial Penile Nodules as a Tool for Identification: A case report". Journal of South Indi. 2 (1).

== See also ==
- P. V. Guharaj
- Tirath Das Dogra
- Madhusudan Gupta
