= Margaret Pavamani =

Freedom fighter from Kerala, India

- Born: 1897; Pappinisseri, Kannur district, Kerala
- Known for: President of a Kerala Mahila Desa Sevika Sangham.
- Movement: Quit India Movement, Swadeshi Movement
- Spouse: Benjamin Pavamani

Margaret Pavamani (1897–1985) was a freedom fighter, social worker in Kerala, India. She was a prominent figure in Civil disobedience movement. She was the wife of Benjamin Pavamani, a prominent lawyer and freedom fighter who was an advocate in Calicut. Margaret born in Pappiniseri on 1897.

== Work ==
She participated in Salt Satyagraha in 1930. On 25 April 1931 with A. V. Kuttimalu Amma she organized a picketing at Thrissur town with a group of women from middle-class families. Her efforts were instrumental in mobilizing women's participation in the movement in Malabar. She also actively picketed toddy shops and shops selling foreign clothes. Her dedication to the cause led to her imprisonment in 1932.

She served as a member of the Calicut Municipal Council. In 1931, she was elected as the president of a Kerala Mahila Desa Sevika Sangham, which aimed to empower women and promote their involvement in social issues. This organization became a platform for women to voice their concerns and take part in the broader fight for independence.
