= Vadeshwaram Temple =

Hindu temple in Kerala, India

- Kailasa of North Malabar
- Vadeshwaram Shiva Kshetram

- Location within Kerala

Religion
- Affiliation: Hinduism
- District: Kannur
- Deity: Shiva
- Governing body: Malabar Devaswom Board

Location
- Location: Aroli
- State: Kerala
- Country: India
- Interactive map of Vadeshwaram Temple
- Coordinates: 11.964444°N 75.36219800000003°E

Architecture
- Type: Ashtadala (eight-petalled)
- Creator: Vatukavarma of Mushika dynasty
- Completed: est. 500 CE
- Elevation: 35 m (115 ft)

Vadeshwaram Temple is a Shiva temple located at Aroli in the Kannur district of Kerala, India.

Vadeshwaram is one among the 108 ancient Shiva temples in Kerala. It is also well known amongst the numerous Shiva temples in South India. It is built on top of a hill that looks like a mountain and is hence known by the nickname 'Kailasa of North Malabar'.

The primary deity of the temple is Vadaka Bhairavan (vadu means disciple), while other deities related to Shiva such as Shasta and Dakshinamurthy are also worshipped. The temple is administered by the Malabar Devaswom Board.

== Location ==
Vadeshwaram Temple is situated 150 metres eastward to the National Highway passing through Kannur. The temple is located at Aroli village in Pappinisseri Panchayat. It is built on top of the hill Keecheri which looks like a mountain and earns the temple its nickname 'Kailasa of North Malabar'. Kannur International Airport is currently the nearest airport

== History ==
The sanctum sanctorum of the Vadeshwaram Temple was constructed in a style known as Ashtadala (eight-petalled). Scholars state that this style is unique to the Vadeshwaram Temple and that this style does not exist in any other temple in India.

== Worship ==
The primary deity of the Vadeshwaram Temple is Shiva. He is worshipped as the main deity in the form of Vadeshwarathappan. Other deities that are worshipped include deities related to Shiva such as Umamaheswara, Shasta, Dakshinamurthy and Kirathamurthy.

== See also ==
- Kottiyoor Temple
- Rajarajeshwara Temple
