= A. V. Kuttimalu Amma =

Indian activist (1905–1985)

- Born: 23 April 1905; Anakkara, Palakkad district
- Died: 14 April 1985 (aged 79)
- Known for: Member of the Calicut Municipal Council, President Hindi Prachar Sabha, Member of AICC, President of Poor Home Society Calicut, Member of Madras Legislative Assembly from tellichery cum Kozhikode.
- Political party: Kerala Pradesh Congress Committee, All India Congress Committee
- Movement: Quit India Movement, Swadeshi Movement
- Spouse: K. Madhava Menon
- Family: Anakkara Vadakkathu

A.V. Kuttimalu Amma or Anakkara Vadakkathu Kuttimalu Amma (1905-1985) was a freedom fighter, social worker and politician in India. She was a prominent figure in Civil disobedience movement.

== Biography ==
She was born in Anakkara village in Palakkad district on 23 April 1905 to Perumbilavil Govinda Menon and Madhaviyamma couple of Anakkara Vadakkathu family at Thrithala.

On 25 April 1931 with Margaret Pavamani she organized a picketing at Thrissur town with a group of women from middle-class families. As a result of civil disobedience movement she was imprisoned along with her 2 month old baby in 1932. After here release she was nominated to madras assembly in 1936. During Quit India Movement (1942), she was imprisoned again for two years at Presidency Jail, Amaravathi. She became a major person in organizing congress proceedings in the regency of Malabar and also worked in Indian national congress working committee. She was the president of Hindi Prachar Sabha and was a Hindi Pracharika. In 1946 she was elected again to Madras legislative assembly. She died in 1985.

She had set up a number of orphanage homes in Malabar. She was married to Kozhipurath Madhava Menon, minister representing Malabar region in Madras presidency.
