= Holy Cross College, Tiruchirappalli =

Women's college in Tamil Nadu, India

Holy Cross College
- Motto: "Truth and Charity"
- Established: 1923; 103 years ago
- Founder: Congregation of the Sisters of the Cross of Chavanado
- Religious affiliation: Roman Catholic (Sisters of the Cross of Chavanado)
- Academic affiliations: Bharathidasan University
- Principal: Rev. Dr.(Sr.) Isabella Rajakumari
- Students: 5564
- Location: Tiruchirappalli, Tamil Nadu, India; 10.82457°N 78.692055°E
- Campus: Urban
- Website: www.hcctrichy.ac.in

College rankings

General – India
- NIRF (Colleges) (2024): 52

Holy Cross College is an autonomous women's college located in Tiruchirappalli, Tamil Nadu, India. It has been recognized as the 'College with Potential for Excellence (CPE)' by the University Grants Commission. The college is ranked 52nd among colleges in India by the National Institutional Ranking Framework (NIRF) in 2025.

== History ==
Holy Cross College was established in 1923 by the 'Sisters of the Cross of Chavanado', province of Trichy. It became a second-grade college in 1928 and postgraduate college in 1964 under the University of Madras. The college was conferred autonomous status in 1987 by the UGC.

== Academic Programmes ==
The college offers undergraduates and postgraduate programmes in arts and science affiliated to the Bharathidasan University. The college has been accredited by National Assessment and Accreditation Council with the highest "A++" Grade (CGPA 3.75 out of 4).
