= Muslim Youth League =

Youth wing of Indian Union Muslim League

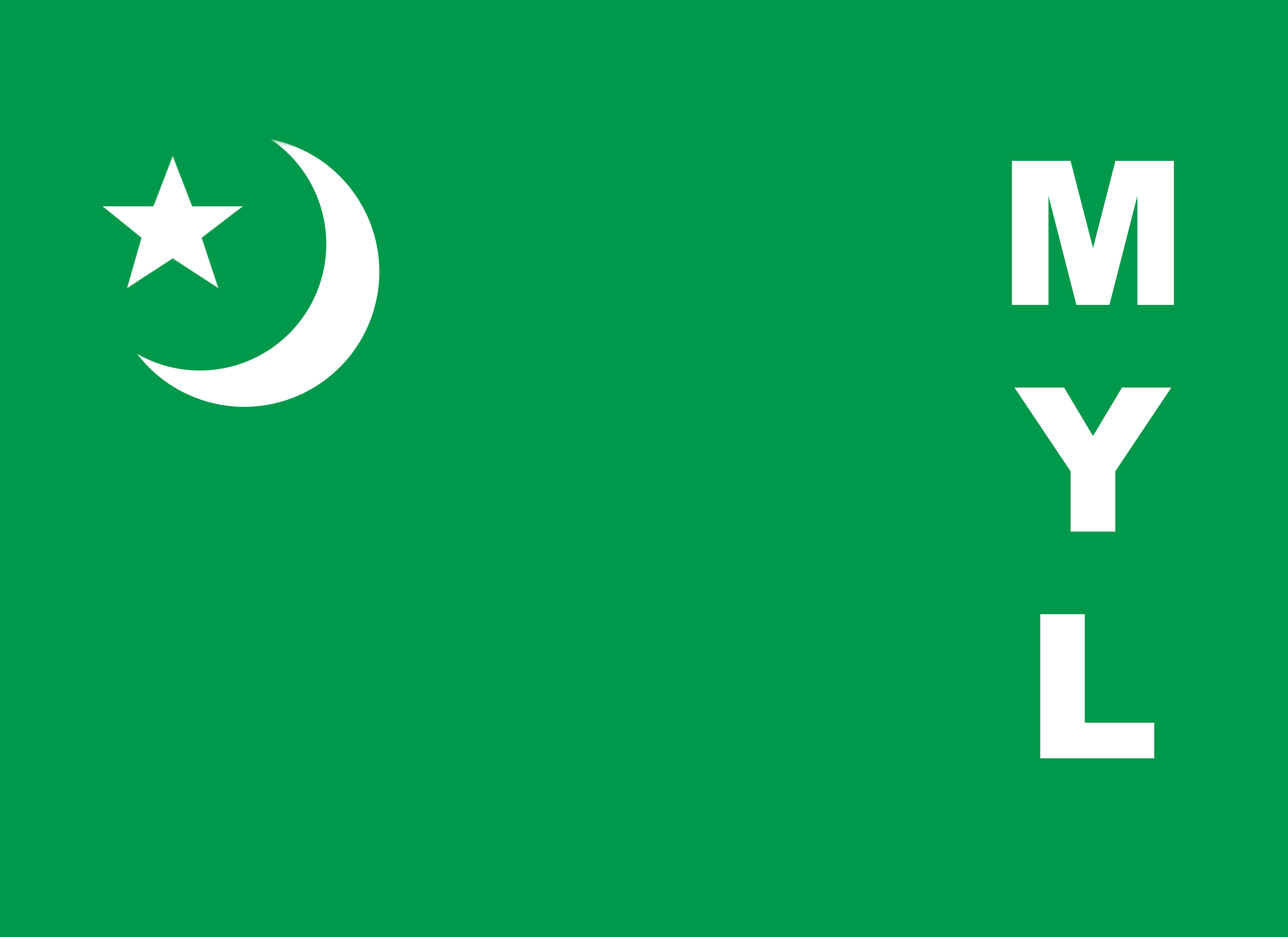
- President: Sarfaraz Ahmed
- National Secretary: T.P Asharafali
- Founded: 1973
- Headquarters: Quaid-E-Millath Centre, Shyam Lal Rd, Daryaganj, New Delhi, 110002.
- Ideology: Honourable Existence
- Mother party: Indian Union Muslim League
- Website: mylindia.in

Muslim Youth League, abbreviated as MYL, is the youth wing of the Indian Union Muslim League. It is led at the national level by Adv. Sarfaraz Ahmed, who serves as National President, and T. P. Asharafali, who serves as National General Secretary.

== Affiliation ==
The Muslim Youth League (MYL) is the official youth wing of the Indian Union Muslim League (IUML). Established in 1973, MYL has its headquarters in New Delhi and state committees across India that organize young members around IUML’s political and social agenda. As a youth organization, MYL mobilizes students and young professionals who endorse the IUML’s principles, channeling their energy into constructive political engagement and community service.

== History ==
The Muslim Youth League (MYL) was established on 3 August 1973 as the official youth wing of the Indian Union Muslim League (IUML), a political party with roots in pre-Partition Muslim politics that reorganised itself in independent India in 1948. The organisation was created to engage young Muslims and other minority youth in political activism, community service, and democratic participation under the broader ideological framework of the IUML, which emphasises secularism, democracy and communal harmony.

MYL’s early purpose was to mobilise youth support for the IUML’s goals of constitutional rights, social justice, and political inclusion. Over time, the organisation expanded its reach through state and district committees, particularly gaining prominence in Kerala where the IUML has significant political influence. The Kerala State Committee of MYL became one of the largest political youth organisations in the state, organising social, political and charity programmes across constituencies.

=== Bhasha Samaram (1980 Language Struggle) ===
In 1980, the Muslim Youth League (MYL) played a central role in the Bhasha Samaram (“Language Struggle”), a mass protest movement in Kerala against the state government’s proposed changes to language education policies that were seen as detrimental to Arabic, Urdu and other second languages in schools. The protests were sparked by the Kerala Education Rule (KER) introduced by the E. K. Nayanar-led government, which altered the status of second languages such as Arabic, Urdu and Sanskrit in government schools and was perceived to threaten the employment of teachers and the linguistic rights of minority communities.

On 30 July 1980, tens of thousands of protesters, including student activists from the Muslim Students Federation (MSF) and members of the MYL, participated in peaceful marches toward district collectorates across Kerala. In Malappuram, police opened fire on the demonstrators during a march to the collectorate at Munduparamba, resulting in the martyrdom of three young MYL activists — Majeed (24), Rahman (21) and Kunhippa (21) — and injuring many others. The violent confrontation and fatalities triggered widespread outrage and intensified the movement. The MYL and allied organisations continued to press for the repeal of the contested language policy, which was eventually withdrawn by the state government under political pressure. The Bhasha Samaram is retrospectively regarded by community organisations as a pivotal moment in the struggle to protect linguistic and cultural rights in Kerala, particularly for the state’s Muslim minority.

== MYL Leadership ==
Current National Leadership - MYL India
Sl.No	Position	Name	State
1	President	Sarfaraz Ahmed	Uttar Pradesh
2	General Secretary	T.P Asharafali	Kerala
3	Treasurer	Ansari Madar	Tamil Nadu
4	Organising Seceretary	Adv. Shibu Meeran	Kerala
5	Vice Presidents	Sayyid Moyeenali Shihab Thangal, Kerala Zubair Khan, Maharashtra Sajjad Husain Akther, Bihar Umar Inamdar, Karnataka Anvar Sadath, Kerala Hasan Zakaria, Tamil Nadu Ashiq Chelavur, Kerala Mufeeda Thasni, Kerala	
6	Secretaries	CK. Shakir, Kerala Mohammed Ilyas, Tamil Nadu Thouseef Husain Reza, Asam Rahmathullah Shareef, Andra Pradesh Sajid Naduvannur, Kerala Adv. Ajarudhin Choudary, Haryana Adv. Najma Thabsheera, Kerala, GA Junaid Uddin Shaikh, Gujarat	

=== Former Office-bearers of MYL National Committee ===
Sl.No	Position	Name	Period
1	President	Sabir S. Gaffar	2017-22
2	General Secretary	C.K Zubair	2017-22
3	President	Asif Ansari	2022-25
4	General Secretary	Adv. Fyzal Babu	2022-25

=== MYL Kerala State Committee ===
Sl.No	Position	Name
1	President	Sayyid Munavvar Ali Shihab Thangal
2	General Secretary	PK Firos

=== Former Office-bearers of Kerala State Committee ===
Year	President	General Secretary
1980	P. K. K. Bava	K. P. A. Majeed
1990	M. K. Muneer	C. Mammutty
1995	M. K. Muneer	K. T. Jaleel
2000	Sadiq Ali Thangal	T A Ahmed Kabeer
2007	K. M. Shaji	N. Samsudheen
2012	P. M. Sadikali	C K Subair
2016	Munavvar Ali Shihab Thangal	PK Firos

=== Muslim Youth League - Gujarat State ===
Current State Leadership- Committee

Name	Position
GA Junaid Uddin Shaikh	President
Darji Akhtar Husani	General Secretary
Siddiqui Sufiyan	Treasure
Mehboob Shaikh	Vice President
Alfez Qureshi	Vice President
Pathan Zakirhusen	Vice President
Shaikh Nafisahemad	Vice President
Shaikh Abdulsamad	Org, Secretary
Shashi Motilal Pillai	Secretary
Sabjifaroj Raish Rafikbhai	Secretary
Shaikh Mukhtar	Secretary
Pathan Sarfaraz Ahmad	Spokesperson
Shaikh Naushad Ali	Executive Member
Sandhi Mufeed Hussain	Executive Member
Mohammad Mahfuj Khan	Executive Member

== White Guard Volunteers ==
Beyond electoral politics, MYL has also undertaken community initiatives such as relief work and volunteer mobilisation. One notable programme associated with its Kerala State Committee is the White Guard Volunteers, a volunteer group engaged in flood rescue, social service and community relief activities across multiple cities in Kerala, reflecting MYL’s efforts to extend its service beyond purely political arenas.

The White Guard Volunteers is a volunteer organisation affiliated with the Muslim Youth League (MYL), with a focus on disaster relief and community support in Kerala. Members commit extended periods of service to assist in rescue operations during natural disasters and to provide social assistance to affected communities. White Guard Volunteers were involved in relief and rescue work during major flooding events in Kerala, notably the 2018 Kerala floods and the 2019 Kerala floods, where volunteer teams took part in local relief efforts and, in some cases, community rebuilding and clean-up tasks after waters receded.

During the COVID-19 pandemic, White Guard also took part in community support efforts such as delivering medicines and essential supplies in coordination with MYL initiatives as part of wider humanitarian response measures. In the 2020 Kerala floods, the group continued its involvement in relief work alongside other civil society organisations engaged in rescue and support efforts across affected districts. In 2024, White Guard Volunteers were active in the aftermath of the Wayanad landslides, collaborating with other volunteer groups to provide food distribution and immediate assistance to landslide survivors across the district.

== Life Lift - MYL Career Wing ==
Life Lift is a career guidance and employment support initiative of the Muslim Youth League (MYL) National Committee.The initiative was launched during a national delegate conference of the organisation held in Agra. Life Lift aims to provide career-related information and guidance to young people, including assistance related to education pathways, employment opportunities, training programmes, and skill development. The initiative’s stated scope includes information on both private- and government-sector employment, as well as opportunities within India and abroad.
