= Kerala floods =

Kerala floods or Kerala flood may refer to these floods in Kerala, India:

- 1341 Kerala floods
- Great flood of 99 (1924)
- 2018 Kerala floods
- 2019 Kerala floods
- 2020 Kerala floods
- 2026 Kerala floods
