= White Guard Volunteers (Kerala) =

White Guards, the volunteers of the Muslim Youth League

White Guard Volunteers ( Kerala India )
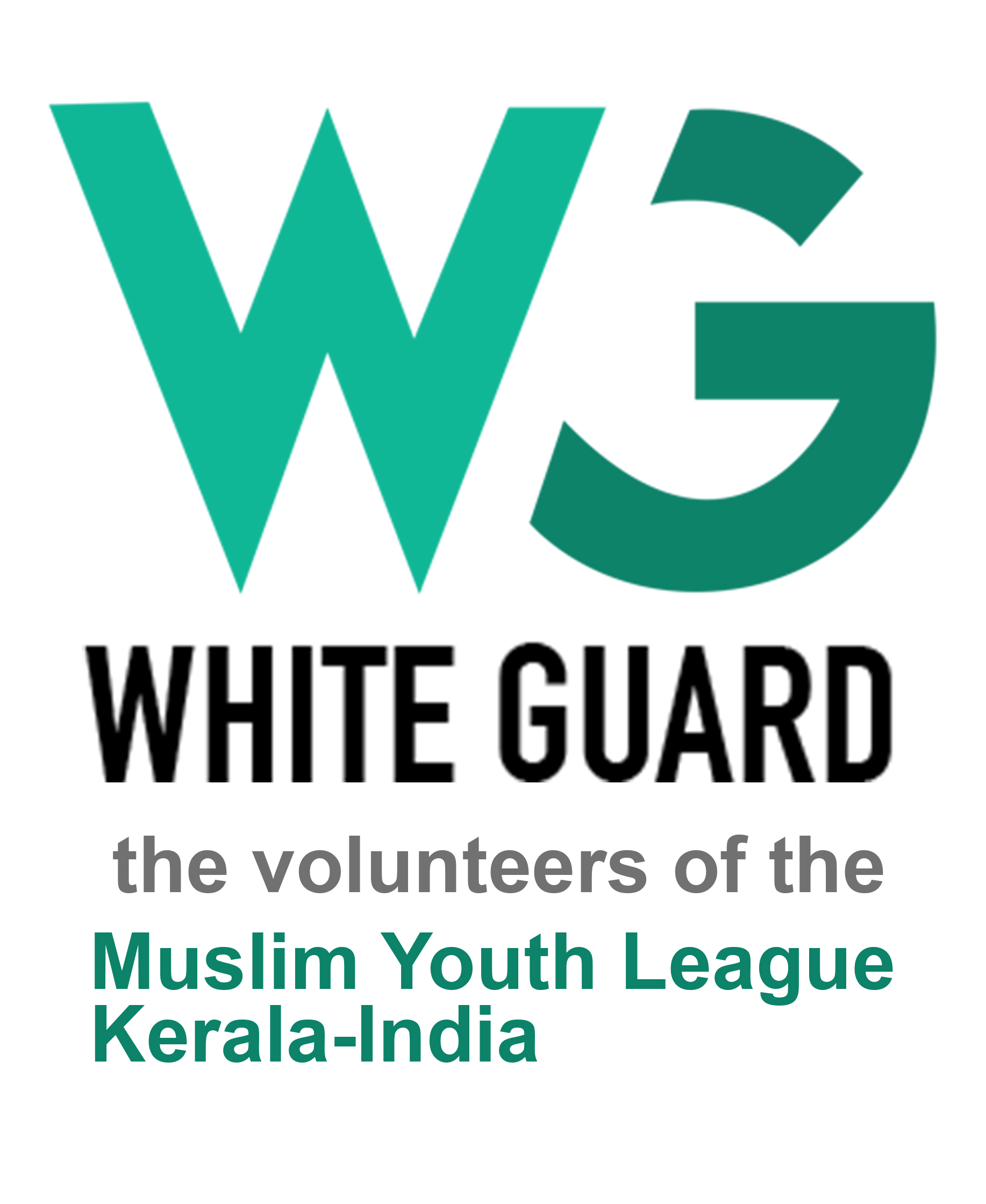
- Founded: 15 September 2018 (Kerala State Committee of Muslim Youth League); May 2019
- Founders: Sayyid Munavvar Ali Shihab Thangal; P. K. Firos; Najeeb Kanthapuram
- Type: Non-governmental organization, Nonprofit religious organization
- Purpose: social service, rescue work
- Location: Calicut, Kerala
- Origins: Calicut
- Region served: Now in Kerala (india)
- Key people: Sayyid Munavvar Ali Shihab Thangal
- Employees: c. 1000
- Volunteers: c. 1 lakh
- Website: Official website

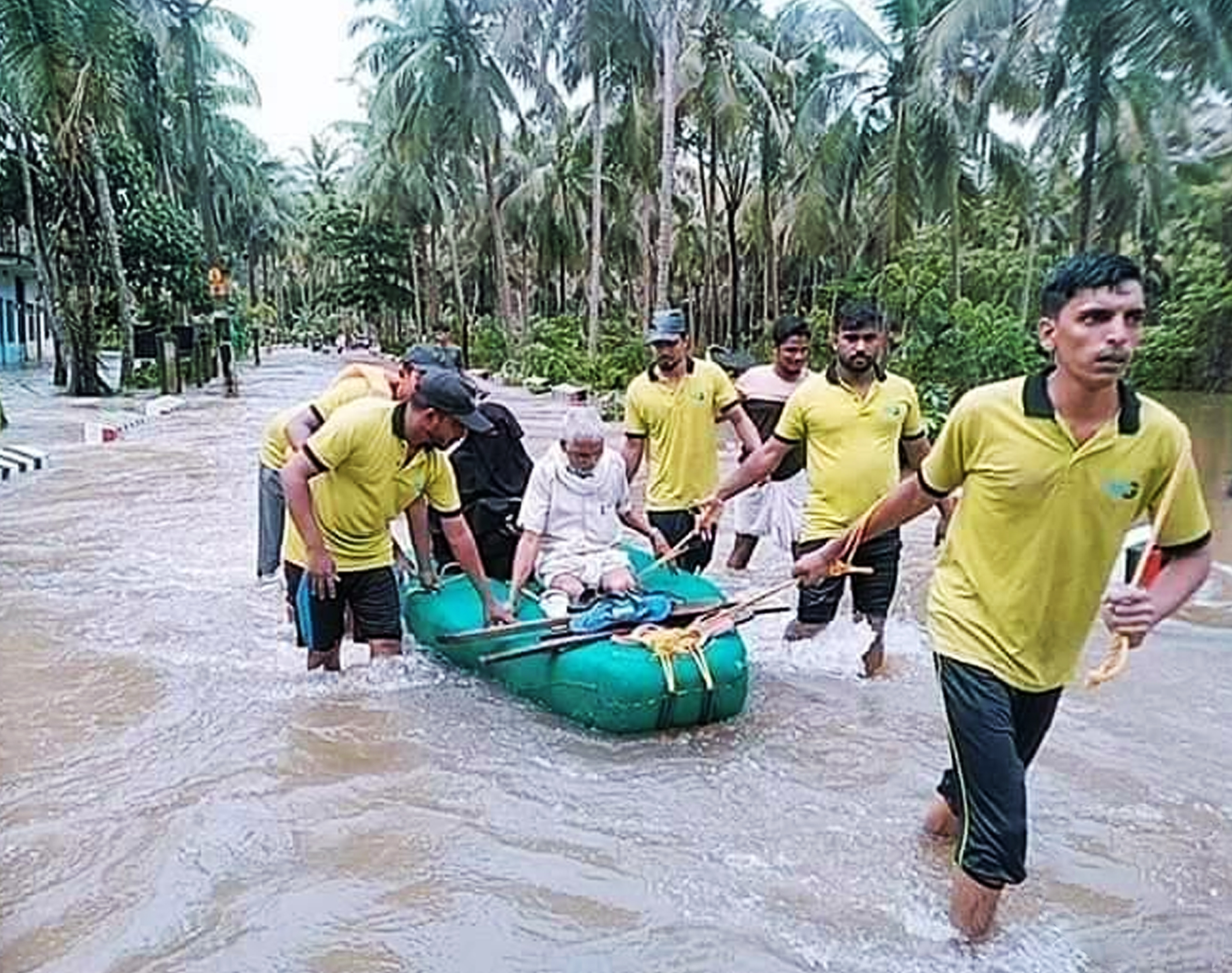
White Guard on relief activities 2019 Kerala floods

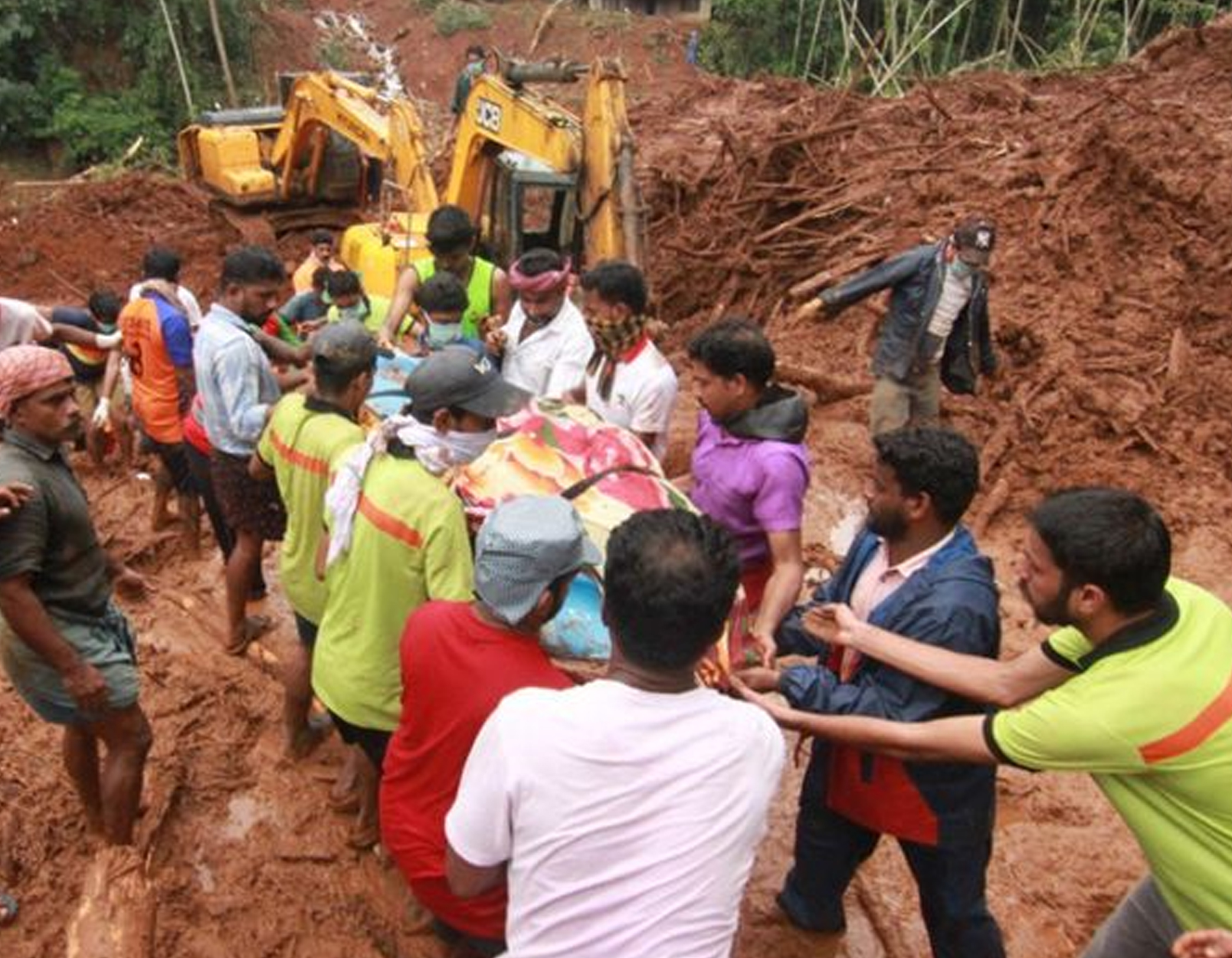
Whiteguard volunteers: rescue service in landslide Kerala 2020

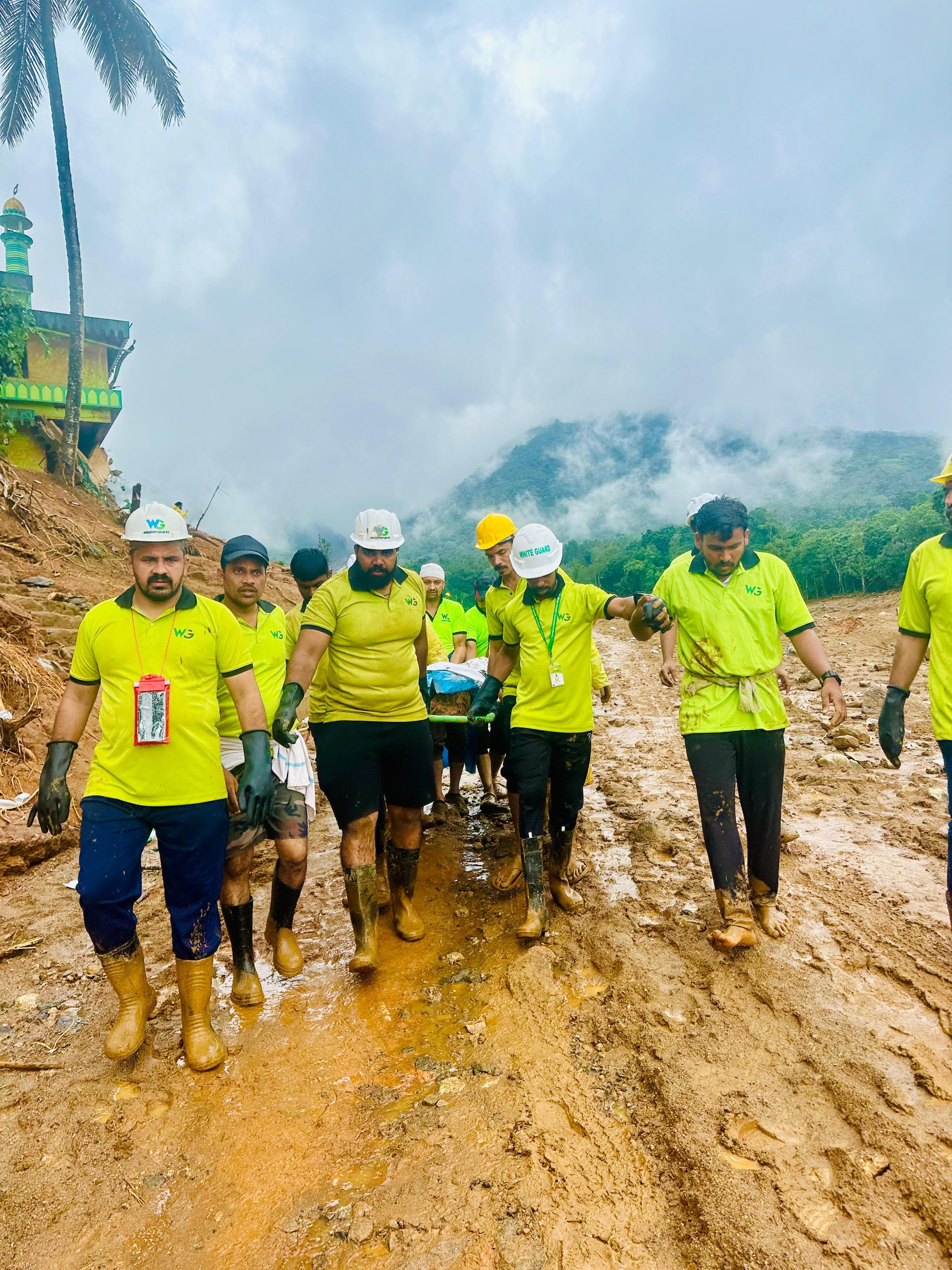
White Guard Volunteers -rescue operation in the 2024 Wayanad landslides

The White Guard Volunteers (WG) is a volunteers organization of Muslim Youth League - IUML, in which people volunteer two years or more to flood rescue service in Kerala and social service with poor communities. White Guard works in Kerala neighborhoods and rural communities in about 20 different cities throughout Kerala, India. White Guards were involved in rescue work during 2018 Kerala floods, 2019 Kerala floods, 2020 Kerala floods, COVID-19 pandemic and 2024 Wayanad landslides.

== Medi Chain Scheme ==
The scheme of humanitarian named Medi Chain is being carried out by involving the volunteers at zonal and district levels. White Guard team with emergency medicine for ex-pats Patients can send written or voice clips including their name, age, gender, and medical history. They will check the patient information and then talk to the expert doctors if necessary and reply to the patients. About 50 doctors specializing in various fields are collaborating with this project. The services of doctors in all fields such as General Medicine, Surgery, Gynecology, Pediatrics, Ortho, ENT, and Ophthalmology are also available. In addition, the services of Ayurvedic and Homeopathic doctors have been made available.

== White Guard Kerala State Committee ==
White Guard of Muslim Youth League (MYL) Kerala State Committee
State Captain	Shafeeq Vachal
State Vice Captain	Badaruddin K.K.
