= Kaakka =

Kaakka - The Crow
- Directed by: Aju Ajeesh
- Written by: Aju Ajeesh; Shinoj Eenikkal; Gopika K Das
- Starring: Lakshmika Sajeevan; Satish Ambadi; Ganga Surendran; Sreela Nalledam; Vipin Neel
- Cinematography: Tony Lloyd Aruja
- Edited by: Aju Ajeesh
- Music by: Abin Sagar
- Production companies: Vellithira Productions; 9 am Shibu K Moideen Productions; NNG Films
- Distributed by: Neestream
- Release date: 14 April 2021
- Running time: 30 minutes
- Country: India
- Language: Malayalam
- Budget: ₹3 lakhs

Kaakka is a 2021 Malayalam-language Indian short film directed by Aju Ajeesh, starring Lakshmika Sajeevan in lead role, with Satish Ambadi, Ganga Surendran, Sreela Nalledam and Vipin Neel in supporting roles. The film released on 14 April 2021 with positive reviews, through Neestream had 6.1 million views, a rarity in Malayalam short film industry.

== Summary ==
Kaakka emphasize the inner beauty of a person that makes her beautiful, and not about what is seen outside, her physical appearance, but beyond that makes life beautiful.

== Cast ==
- Lakshmika Sajeevan
- Satish Ambadi
- Ganga Surendran
- Sreela Nalledam
- Vipin Neel
- Devasurya
- Vinu Lavanaya
- Mohammed Faizal
- Sajith Thoppil
- Abdul Latheef
- Shibu Kuttan

== Production ==
Vellithira, a WhatsApp group formed in 2016 decided to venture into film production, but their plan was derailed due to Kerala floods first and later due to COVID lockdown. Finally in November 2020, the crew completed the shooting in a single schedule. On 28 February 2021, Tony Lloyd Aruja, the cinematographer of the film died in an accident, as his bike skidded and his head hitting the divider.
