= 2019 Kerala floods =

Severe flooding due to heavy monsoon rainfall on 8 August 2019

- Date: 8 August 2019 – 29 August 2019
- Location: Kerala, India
- Cause: Heavy rain Discharges; Landslide
- Deaths: 121 dead
- Property damage: ₹2,101.9 crore (US$220 million)
- Website: www.keralarescue.in

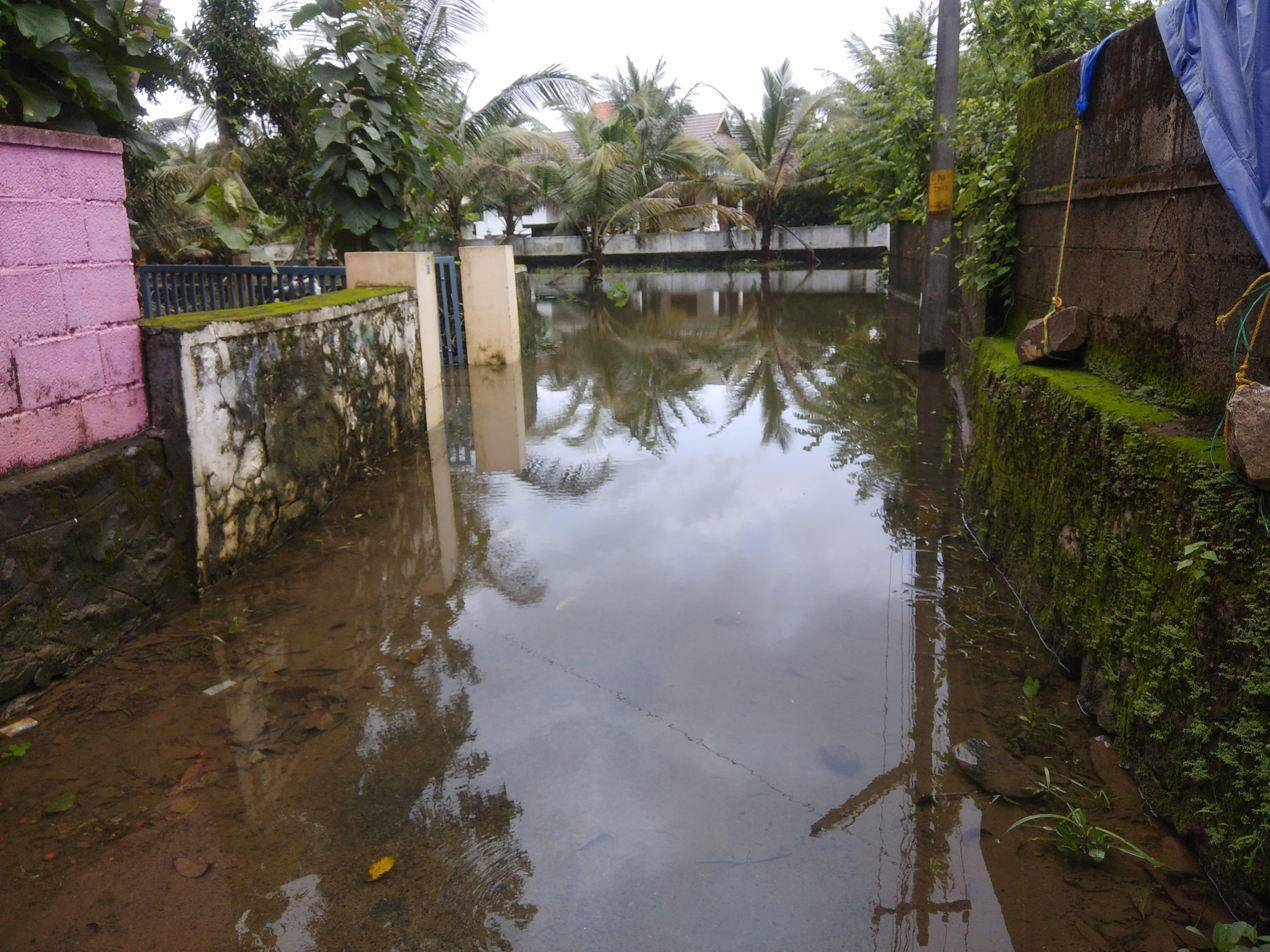
A flooded road at Angamaly

On 8 August 2019, due to heavy rainfall in the monsoon season, severe flood affected Kerala. As a security measure in the prevailing situation of heavy rains, the India Meteorological Department had issued a red alert in the 9 districts in Northern and Central Kerala, orange alert in 3 districts of Central Kerala, and yellow alert in the 2 districts of southern Kerala. Thousands of people have been evacuated to safer places and relief camps. A total of 121 people have died due to rain-related incidents as of 19 August 2019.

Another deluge had hit the state in August 2018, in which over 470 people died and properties worth US$5.8 billion (₹40,000 crore) were damaged.

== Causes ==
The extreme rains were triggered by a depression toss the Arabian sea resulting in intense convection over Kerala. Every year parts of South Asia are hit by a period of heavy rains known monsoons which usually fall between June and September. It is caused by a change of wind patterns over the region. This change causes heavy rains in the summer and long dry spells over the other months. In India, the monsoon rains can provide 70% of the country's rainfall for the year. The rain fall so quickly and heavily that it can cause sudden flooding. The rationale for the anomalous rainfall in 2018 might have recurred the extreme events in 2019; i.e., the High-Frequency Mixed Rossby-Gravity Waves in the Mid-Troposphere which were triggered by the synoptic disturbances of the tropical Pacific. These high-frequency waves manifested as cyclonic and anticyclonic circulations and dilated the wind field to establish zones of convection in the tropics, as they propagated across the Indian Ocean basin. Although the Madden-Julian Oscillation phase with 20–40 days period has favored convection in the tropics, the high-frequency mode correlates better with the anomalous precipitation during the intervals of extreme events.

== Impact ==
As of 19 August 2019, 121 people have been killed due to the floods across the state of Kerala. Over 2 lakh people have been directly affected by the flood, and have been shifted to 1318 relief camps in different parts of Kerala. Airport authorities suspended operations of the flood-affected [Cochin International Airport] till 15:00 (IST) on 11 August 2019. The data from the Kerala State Disaster Management states that, as many as 1,789 houses had been damaged fully in between 8 and 19 August, while the number of partially damaged houses is 14,542.

There have been 80 landslides in the span of 2 days, as said by the Chief Minister. Many people were buried alive and could not be found. The situation was critical as the calamities interfered with the rescue operations. Districts that have been severely affected include Wayanad, Malappuram, Kozhikode, Kannur, Palakkad, Idukki, Thrissur and Ernakulam districts.

== Rescues ==
Kerala's State Disaster Management Authority, Kerala police, Kerala Fire & Rescue Services along with the Indian Air Force, Indian Navy, civilians, volunteers like Seva Bharati, DYFI, SFI, Indian Youth Congress, White Guard Volunteers fishermen from coastal Kerala are actively taking part in the rescue operations in flood-affected regions. However, inclement weather with heavy rains and landslides are hampering the rescue operations in the hilly regions of Wayanad, Malappuram, and Kozhikode districts. 83 National Disaster Response Force(NDRF) teams were deployed in addition to the 173 teams of Army, Navy, Air Force, and Coast Guard to take part in the relief operations.

Animal rescue was carried out by local NGOs and activists on ground mainly in places like Wayanad and Nilambur. Notable work was done by Sally Varma of Humane Society International/India in Nilambur where around 500 kg of dog food and more than 5000 kg of cattle feed and 2500 kg of goat feed was distributed to the starving animals.

== Relief and monetary aid ==
Immediate financial aid of up to ₹10,000 each for all calamity-hit families which had suffered losses in the torrential rains. A sum of Rs 4 lakh would be given to those whose houses had been fully damaged or had become uninhabitable and ₹10 lakh to those who had lost their houses as well as land in the rain fury and landslides, Chief Minister's cabinet meeting.Kerala Govt Announces Flood relief Package; Rs 10,000 Immediate Aid to Calamity-hit Families

In August 2019, Public has been very generous contributing to Chief Minister's Distress Relief Fund. As on 15 Aug 2019 at 19:40 income is ₹4368.2 Crore.

== See also ==
- 2019 Indian floods
- 2018 Kerala floods
- 2020 Kerala floods
- 2019 in Kerala
- 2026 Kerala floods
