= 2020 Kerala floods =

Indian flood

- Cause: Heavy rain Deforestation and slope alteration Inadequate drainage Climate Change
- Deaths: 104 dead, 12 missing, 40 injured
- Property damage: ₹19,000 crore (estimated)
- Website: www.keralarescue.in

During the heavy rainfall over the monsoon period from 1 June to 18 August 2020, all 14 districts in Kerala were affected with 104 dead, 12 missing and 40 injured. Four districts in Kerala Idukki, Wayanad, Malappuram and Kottayam were flooded on 7 August 2020. Major reported incidents in relation to flooding include a landslide in Idukki district on 6 August, claiming 66 lives and a plane crash that claimed the lives of 21 people. The 2020 flood in Kerala marked the third year in a row of severe monsoon flooding.

This event resulted in loss of lives, livestock and agriculture and damage to property of approximately ₹19,000 crore (₹190 billion). The Kerala State Disaster Management Plan was submitted to the Central Government to improve the disaster management capacity of the state.

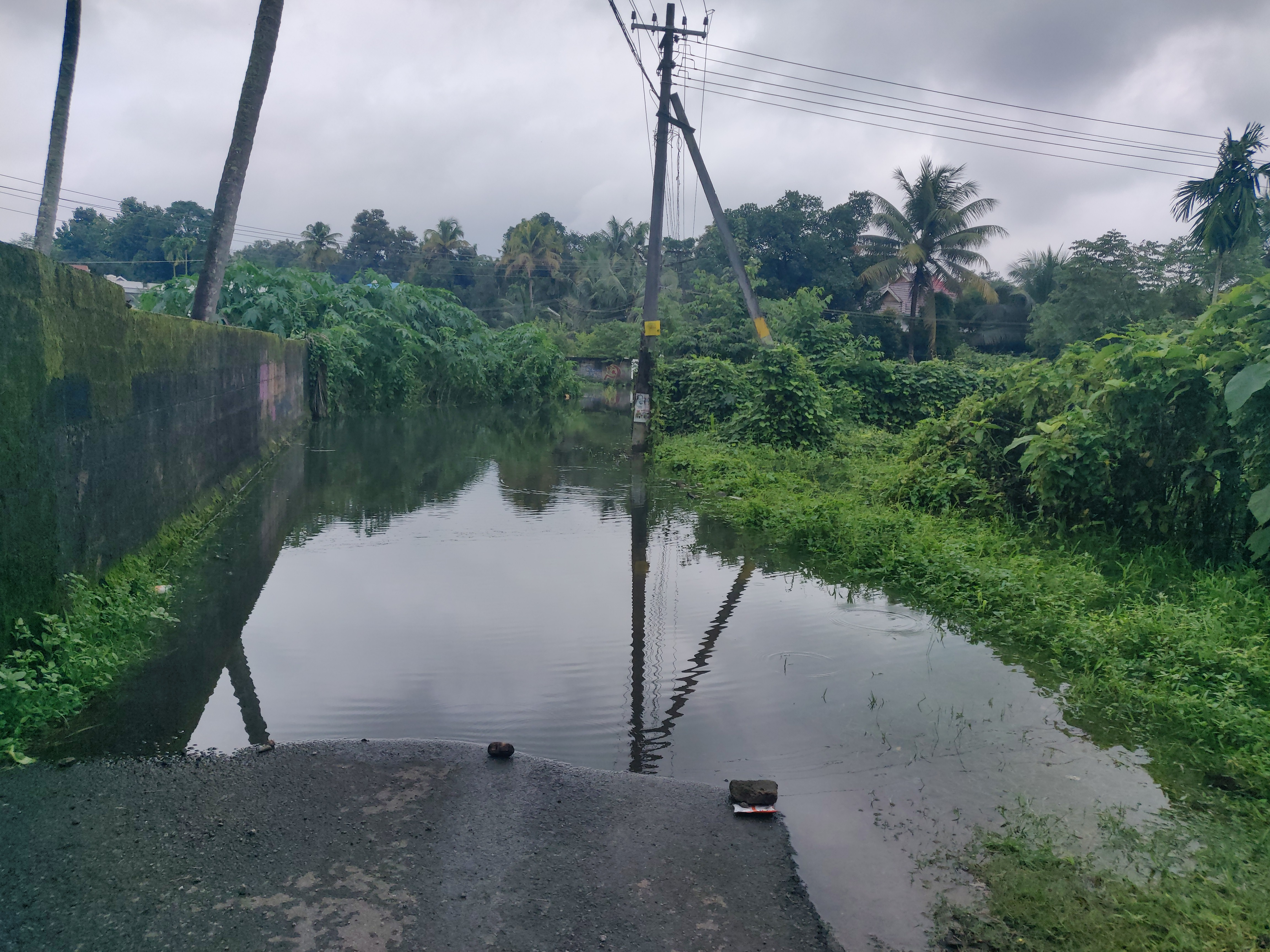
A flooded road at Angamaly

== Introduction ==
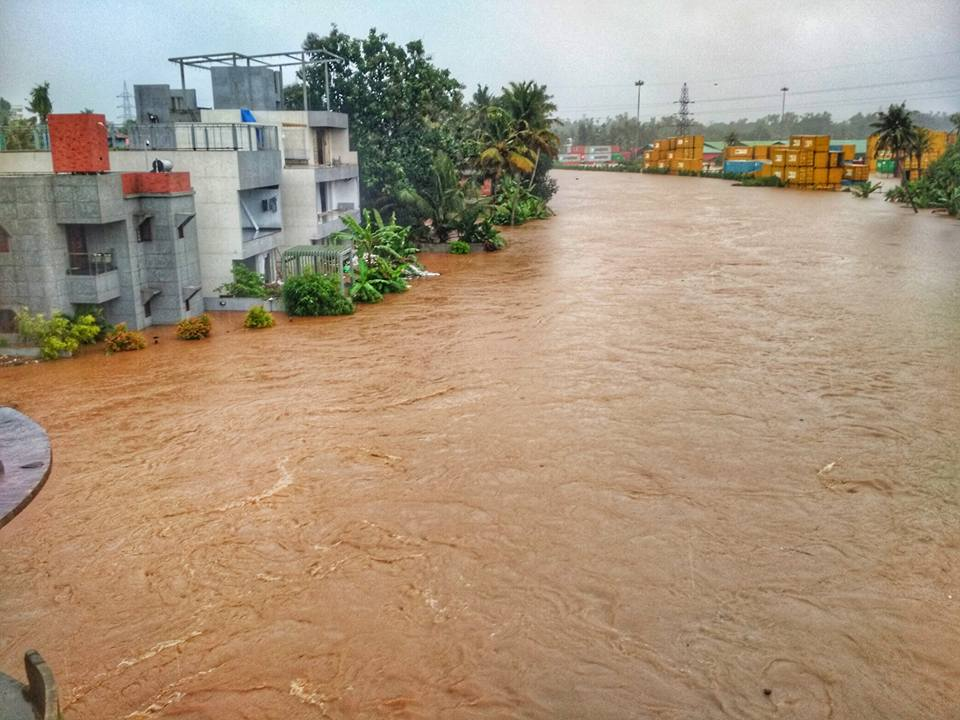
Flood waters in Kerala

=== Geography and rainfall patterns in Kerala ===
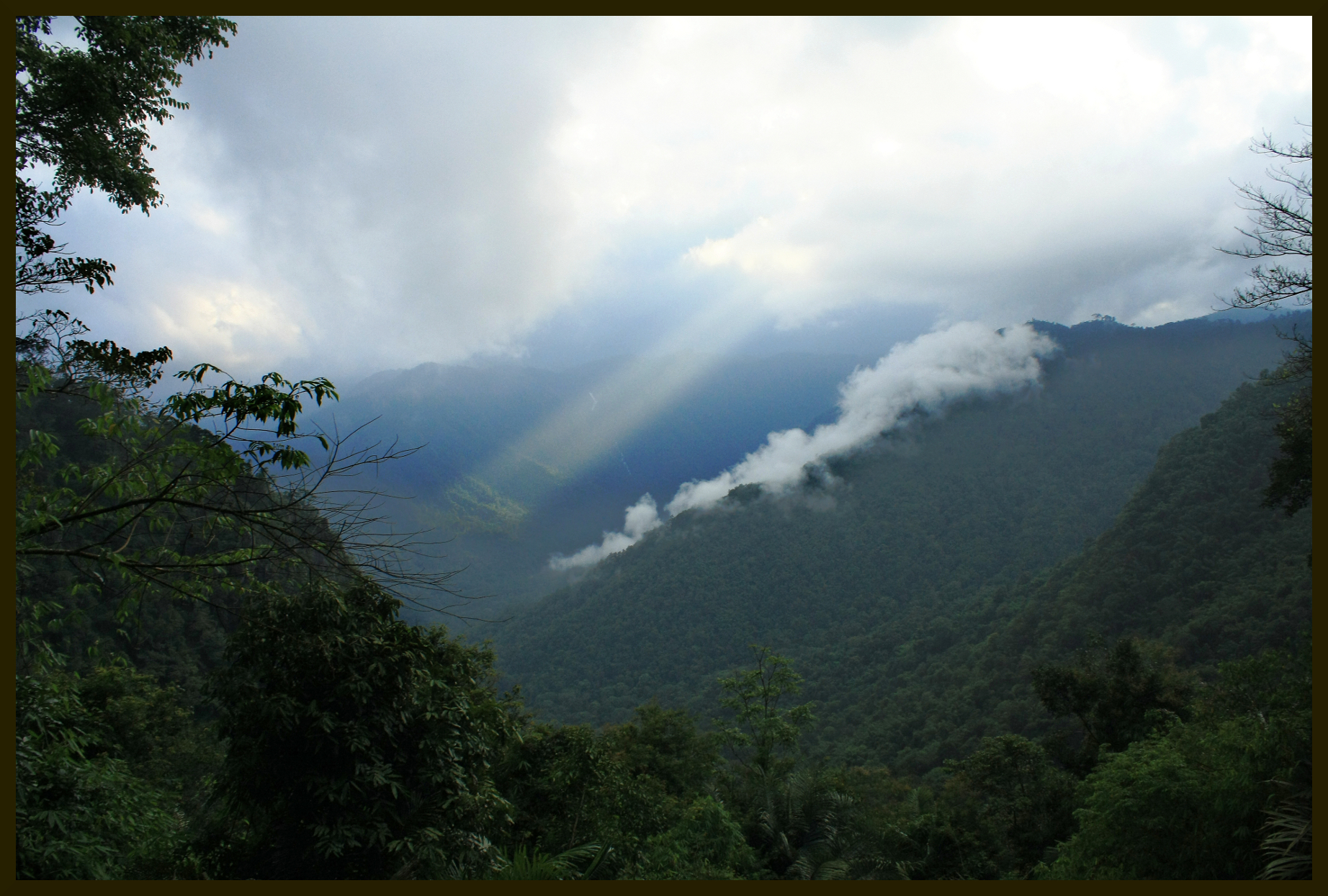
Monsoon clouds in the Western Ghats region

Kerala is located in the south-western part of India and has a tropical climate with high annual rainfall caused by monsoon rain patterns. The majority of its annual rainfall (~80%) occurs during the Southwest Summer Monsoon where warm winds from the Arabian sea cause cloud precipitation over the Western Ghats mountain range. Average annual rainfall in Kerala is around 300 cm and is caused by high numbers of low-to-moderate intensity rainfall days.

=== Flood stages and warning systems ===
Thiruvananthapuram's Early Warning System (EWS) plan of 2016, classifies flood alerts as level 1, 2 or 3. The response to each alert level may include notifying local government, broadcasting to the public, activating response teams or evacuating high risk areas. By 9 August 2020, the India Meteorological Department (IMD) had placed 7 districts in Kerala under red alert.

Flood alert levels for districts of Kerala: 9 August 2020
Level	Colour	Response	Districts under alert
1	Yellow	Standby	Thiruvananthapuram
2	Orange	Prepare	Palakkad, Thrissur, Ernakulam, Kottayam, Pathanamthitta, Kollam districts
3	Red	Evacuate	Alappuzha, Idukki, Malappuram, Wayanad, Kozhikode, Kannur and Kasaragod districts

== Analysis of causes ==
=== Weather ===
Kerala experienced 5 low pressure systems during the south west monsoon season in August 2020. This combined with strong winds over the Arabian Sea resulted in cloudbursts which saturated soil structures, further weakening bedrock, overwhelming rivers and drainage systems. Kerala experienced 190% increase in rainfall in the first 10 days of August compared to normal patterns, causing widespread destruction, flooding and landslides. Coastal towns, such as Chellanam, dealt with floods as well as rough seas pushing back on rivers, exacerbating flooding.

=== Landslides ===
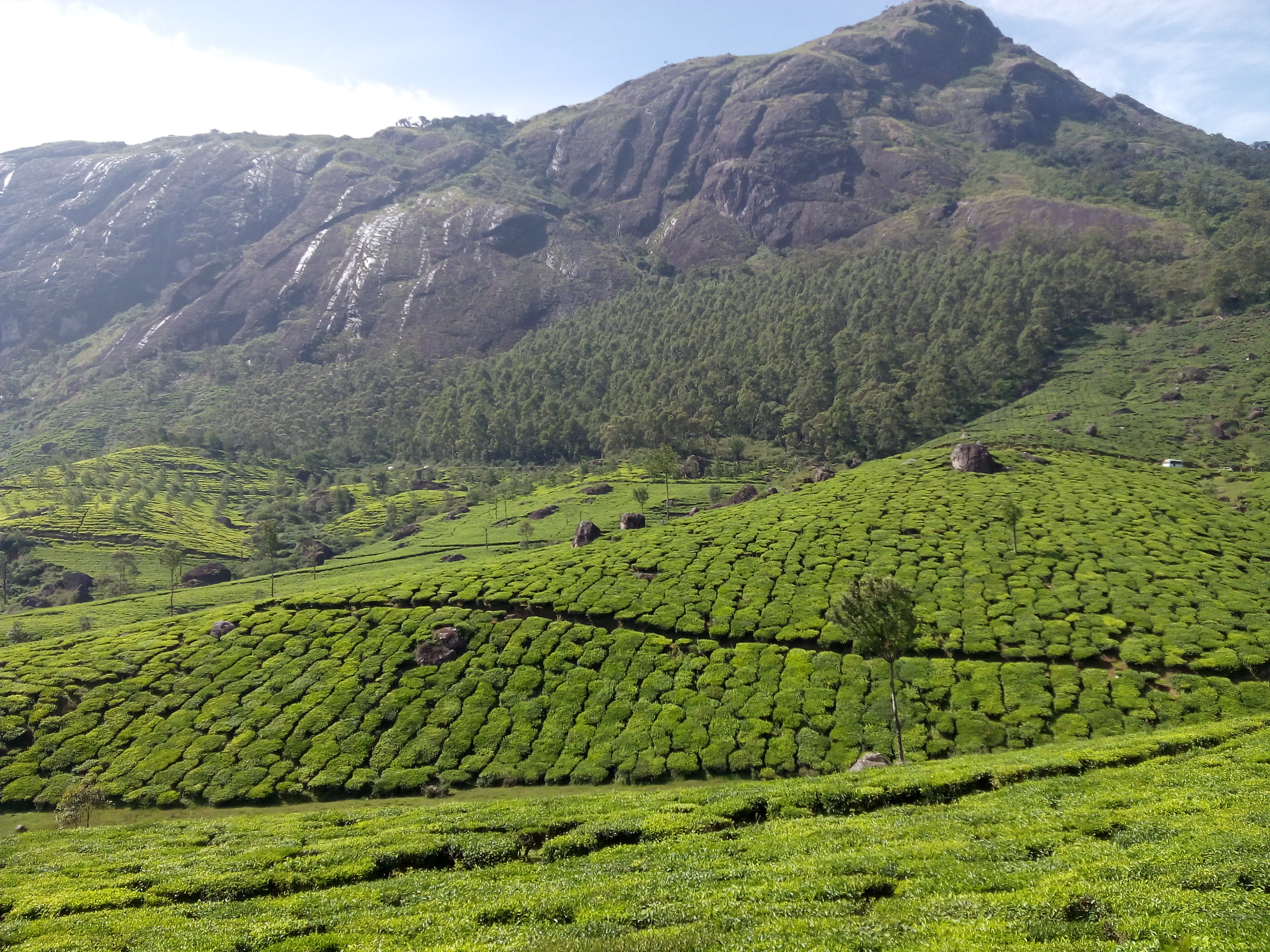
Tea plantation in Munnar, Idukki, showing the steep gradient of the slopes from rocky outcrops, shola forests to the low-lying tea plantations

An analysis of the most significant landslide in the Pettimudi tea estate, Munnar, Idukki, found that the area experienced "extremely heavy rainfall" as classified by the IMD between 3 and 10 August. Rainfall volume peaked at 612mm falling on 6 August with the landslide occurring at 22:45 IST. Categorised as "rain induced debris flow" the landslide was characterised by rapid water flow at a steep gradient, flowing at high velocity from the rocky outcrops through the shola forest collecting loose material along its course to the tea plantation and worker's living quarters below. Additional landslides occurred in Idukki, Mundakkai, Kakkayam in Kozhikode, Nilambur in Malappuram and Kottayam.

Factors compounding flooding and landslides in Kerala 2020
Deforestation and slope alteration (including agriculture, mining and quarrying)
Rain conservation pits
Insufficient drainage systems
Construction (including buildings and roads) along stream beds, rivers and flood lines
Climate change

== Impacts and consequences ==
=== Direct impacts ===
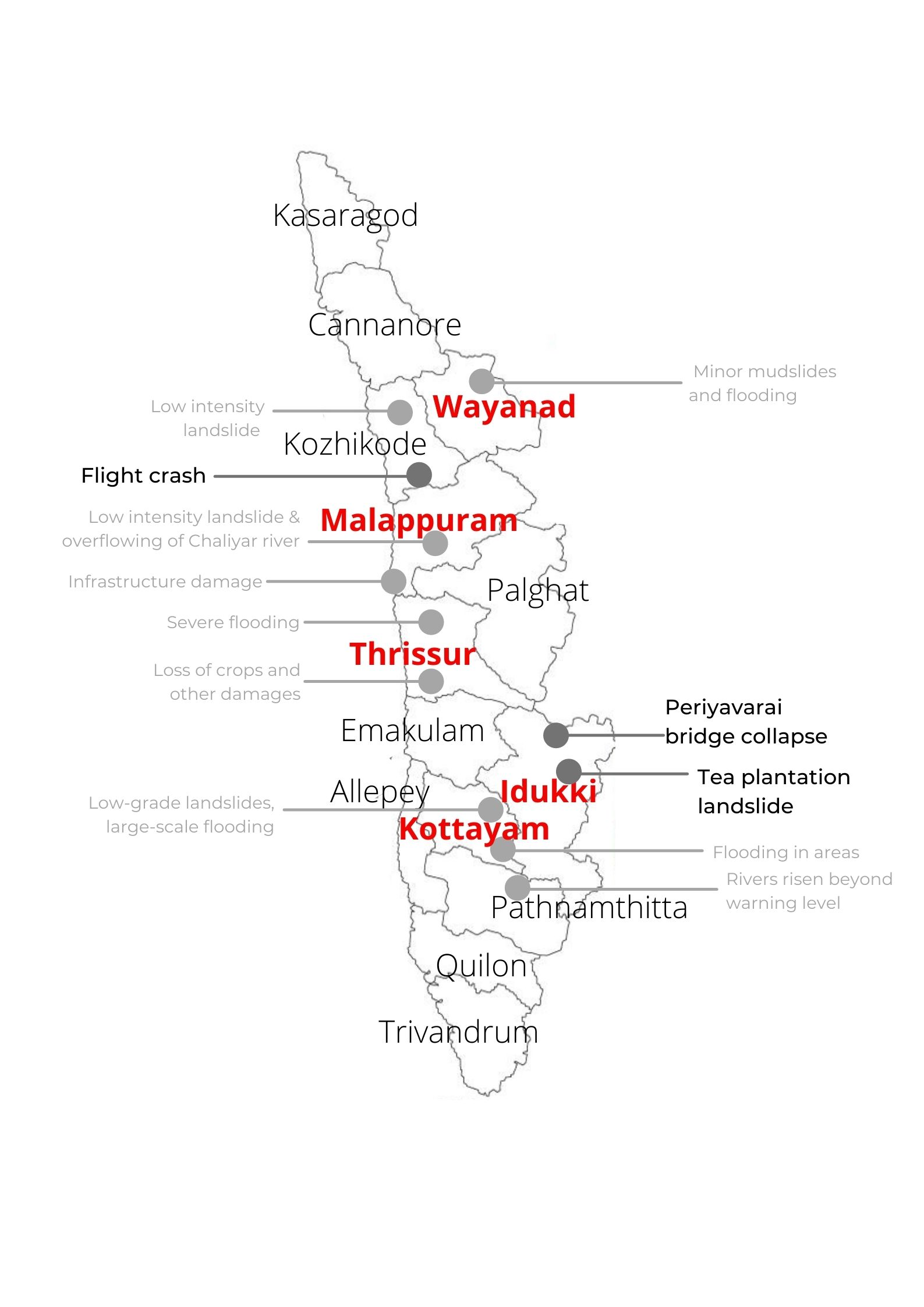
Overview of Kerala district map depicting August 2020 flood-related incidents

The landslide in the Pettimudi tea estate saw significantly heavy rainfall, resulting in excessive flooding and landslide over a 1.2 km tract. Final reports indicate that it destroyed 4 buildings and killed 66 individuals. Majority of the victims were descendants from the Dalits caste system. Meanwhile, low-intensity mudslides and landslides occurred in other regions.

On 7 August, the monsoon rain also caused poor landing conditions at Kerala's Calicut Airport. Due to the COVID-19 pandemic, only repatriation flights were allowed. On the 3rd landing attempt, Air India Express Flight 1344 crashed after it slid down a 9–10.5m slope off the runway, killing both pilots and 19 passengers.

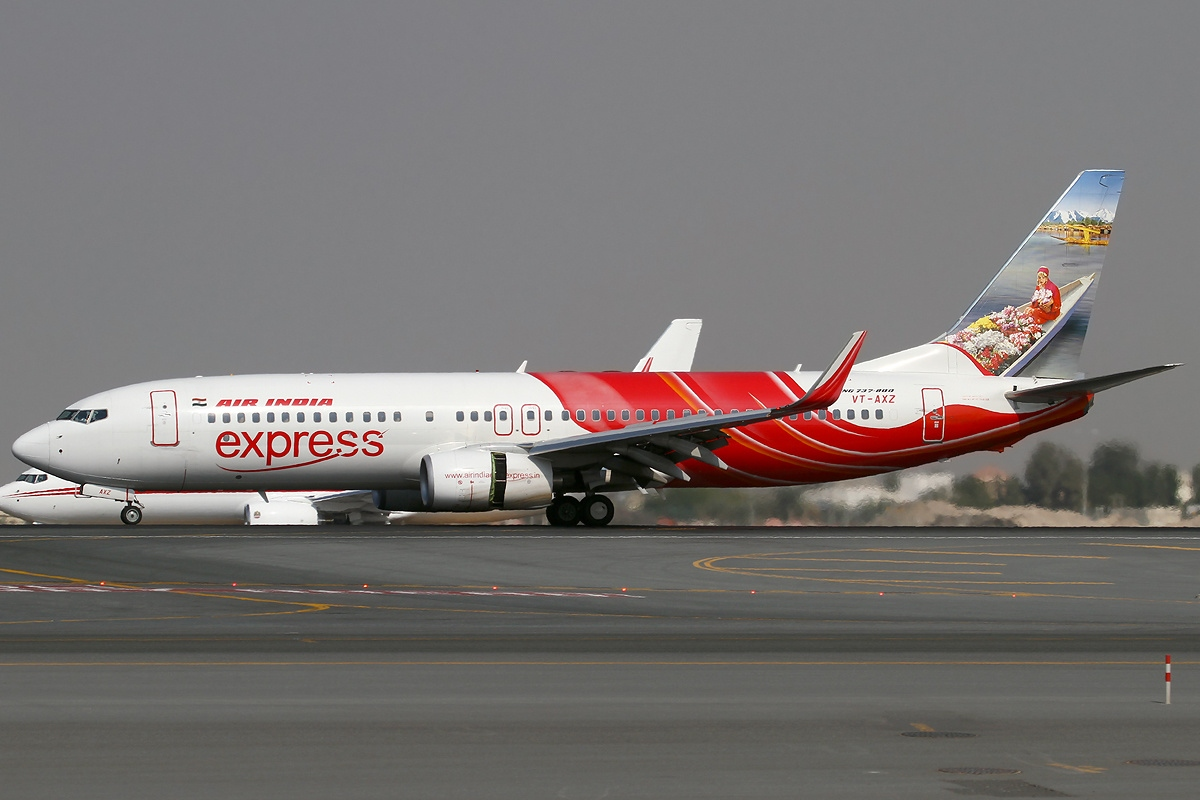
The aircraft type (Boeing 737-8HG) involved in Air India Express Flight 1344's incident

=== Indirect impacts ===
Search and rescue efforts in this area were stalled due to bad weather conditions. The collapse of the Periyavarai bridge, which is the only connectivity for interstate transport between Munnar to Marayur was also an issue. Authorities reported closure of multiple routes including the Pala-Erattupetta road in the Kottayam district where the Meenachil River overflowed into neighbouring towns. Destruction of power lines further affected communication links to the area which caused logistical difficulties in the supply of basic necessities.

Evacuation and relocation efforts led to many residing in temporary relief camps. A mild increase in COVID-19 cases was reported in Chellanam's relief camps, complicating the situation. Agricultural produce was also affected with loss of crops, especially in Kuttanad, and disruptions to transportation caused an increase in food prices.

According to the Ministry of Home Affairs, a total of 1,670 villages were affected, 104 lives lost and 40 injured. Short-term health consequences post-flood include injuries and communicable diseases (e.g. diarrhoea) while long-term impacts includes poor health outcomes due to aspects like malnutrition and mental health issues.

Ministry of Home Affairs Disaster Management Division Situation Report as of 18 August 2020, 1900Hr
Number of Affected	During Monsoon Season (1 June 2020 to 18 August 2020)
Districts	All 14 districts in Kerala
Villages	All 1,670 villages in Kerala
Total Dead/ Missing/ Injured	104/ 12/ 40
Houses Damaged	220 fully destroyed, 5,190 in parts
Property Damage Cost (Estimated)	₹19,000 crore

== Response & relief efforts ==
=== National ===
The primary response at the state and national level was to set up relief camps for the flood affectees. A total of 6,300 camps were arranged in the state. In Kollam alone, 51 camps were set up, one in each taluk. The national government also announced ₹200,000 to be distributed among families of casualties of landslides caused by the floods, and ₹50,000 provided to the injured, both through the Prime Minister's National Relief Fund. Kerala's State Disaster Management Authority (KSDMA), police and Indian Air Force actively took part in the rescue operations. To search for missing persons, the National Disaster Response Force (NDRF) was activated, with around 200 personnel. Fire Force and Forest officials also joined the response teams. This task force consisted of 50 Fire Force members specializing in night-time rescue activities.

=== International ===
In the aftermath of the 2018 Kerala Floods, the Indian government refused international aid for relief efforts. They cited sufficient domestic capacity to deal with the disaster, in line with its policy to accept no foreign aid. It is also seen as a measure to portray the image of India being well equipped to address its needs, and thus little International aid is accepted.

=== Organizations and individuals ===
The rugged terrain of Kerala made relief efforts quite challenging for national and international response teams. To fill this gap, local organizations like RIGHTS who were familiar with the geography and had deep local connections rose to the challenge. IAG Kerala and Sphere India assisted in closely monitoring the situation. These grassroots bodies prioritized safeguarding of children and vulnerable populations, putting focus on ensuring their education continues uninterrupted. This was also supplemented by direct cash transfer to their families.

Political and social activists also joined in the efforts in their personal capacities. P.B. Nooh, the District Collector, used his Facebook presence to conduct frequent live sessions to provide updates on relief efforts to the affected population.

== Flood management ==
Kerala is vulnerable to multiple hazards with flooding in 2018, 2019, 2020 and 2021 and 43% of the state prone to landslides. Kerala State Disaster Management Plan outlines the need to reduce hazard risk with mitigation, preparedness, response and recovery.

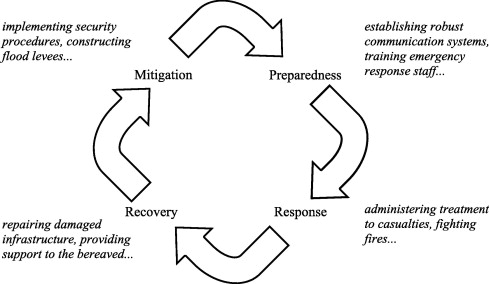
Four phases of disaster management

=== Mitigation ===
Structural measures consist of 81 dams, reservoirs and flood embankments. Non-structural measures include flood hazard mapping and landslide zoning, but larger scale maps are needed to develop effective mitigation plans. River discharge is monitored at 38 river gauging stations by the Central Water Commission. Kerala has 68 rain gauging stations, but the Bureau of Indian Standards recommends 265 to sufficiently monitor rainfall.

=== Preparedness ===
IMD monitors weather and Kerala State Emergency Operations Centre (KSEOC) issue colour coded extreme weather alerts. KSDMA provides public alerts through their website and social media platforms. KSEOC is working with the Geological Survey of India, Kerala University and Kerala Development and Innovation Strategic Council to develop a landslide early warning system. In 2020, 14 permanent multipurpose shelters were constructed by KSDMA with funding from the World Bank. Civil defence systems have increased training to support search and rescue efforts and the government has given greater autonomy to local agencies and NGOs.

=== Response ===
Operations involve the implementation of disaster event preparations from Rapid Action Force (RAF), NDRF and Kerala Fire and Rescue. During the floods, NDRF set up 6,300 relief camps with COVID-19 categorisation. COVID-19 restrictions resulted in fewer vector-borne diseases. Experts initially warned of increased risk of dengue in 2020, but Kerala registered five dengue deaths, a decrease from 2018 and 2019.

=== Recovery ===
Damage and cost estimates are made prior to reconstruction with funding from the State and National Disaster Response Funds. KSDMA published a handbook on constructing flood and landslide resilient housing. Further national and international assistance may be sought by the state.

=== Recommendations ===
- Implementation of Sponge Cities
- Increase hydrometric network coverage and improve data reliability
- Reduce rates of deforestation in upland areas and encourage reforestation
- Increase flood resistant buildings

== Critiques of flood response plans ==
The response to the 2020 floods incorporated lessons from previous years by increasing the use of social media to broadcast flood warnings to the community, releasing water from dams earlier in the monsoon season and establishing evacuation camps for those in high risk areas. Despite improvements being made, Kerala's flood alert system has been heavily critiqued for its inadequacy in responding to flood situations in a timely and coordinated fashion.

Critiques of Kerala's flood response systems
Lack of coordinated state-wide response
Incomplete modelling and mapping of flood-prone areas
Poor correlation between forecasted and actual rain with delayed flood warnings
Poor management of dams (overfilling) and inappropriately timed release of water
Poor regulation of land usage that predisposes to climate change and flooding

== See also ==
- Kerala floods
- 2018 Kerala floods
- 2019 Kerala floods
- 2019 Indian floods
- Floods in India
- Weather of 2020
- 2020 South Asian floods
- 2026 Kerala floods
