= 2018 Kerala floods =

Flooding that occurred in Kerala

- Disaster of Kerala
- Date: July 2018 – August 2018
- Location: Kerala, India
- Cause: Heavy rain Discharges; Landslide
- Deaths: 500
- Property damage: ₹40,000 crore (US$4.2 billion) (estimated)

On 16 August 2018, severe floods affected the south Indian state Kerala, due to unusually heavy rainfall during the monsoon season. It was the worst flood in Kerala in nearly a century since the great flood of '99 that took place in 1924. Over 483 people died, and about one million people were evacuated, mainly from Chengannur, Pandanad, Edanad, Aranmula, Kozhencherry, Ayiroor, Ranni, Pandalam, Kuttanad, Malappuram, Aluva, Chalakudy, Thrissur, Thiruvalla, Eraviperoor, Vallamkulam, North Paravur, Chendamangalam, Chellanam, Vypin Island, and Palakkad. All 14 districts of the state were placed on red alert. According to the Kerala government, one-sixth of the total population of Kerala was directly affected by the floods and related incidents. The Indian government declared it a Level 3 Calamity, or "calamity of a severe nature".

Thirty-five out of the fifty-four dams within the state were opened for the first time in history. All five overflow gates of the Idukki Dam were opened at the same time, and for the first time in 26 years, five gates of the Malampuzha dam of Palakkad were opened. Heavy rains in Wayanad and Idukki caused severe landslides and left the hilly districts isolated. The National Crisis Management Committee coordinated the rescue and relief operations. The dam openings disrupted the lives of many of those living nearby.

With the recurrence of flood events in the state in the subsequent years, several studies have attempted to explain the behavior.

== Causes ==
Rainfall from the southwest monsoon was 23% higher than normal in Kerala in 2018, with August seeing rainfall 164% above normal. On the evening of 8 August, Kerala received heavy rainfall, which was 116% more than usual, resulting in dams filling to their maximum capacities. In the preceding 48 hours, the state received 310 mm (12 in) of rain. Almost all dams had been opened since the water had risen close to overflow levels due to heavy rainfall, which flooded local low-lying areas. For the first time in the state's history, 35 of its 54 dams had been opened. The deluge is considered an impact of global warming.

Independent scientific studies conducted by hydrology experts from IIT Madras, Purdue University, and IIT Gandhinagar concluded that heavy downpour and dam management resulted in the floods. Based on a computer simulation of flood storage and flow patterns by a team of researchers from IIT Madras and Purdue University, it was found that the devastation wrought by the floods cannot be attributed to the release of water from dams. Further, the scientists added that the odds of such floods were 0.06% and no reservoir management could have considered such scenarios. A hydrology expert, researcher from IIT Gandhinagar, Vimal Mishra, identified four major factors for the floods: unexpected above-normal downpour, extreme rainfall events occurring almost across Kerala during the season, over 90% reservoir storage even before the onset of extreme rainfall events, and the unprecedented extreme rainfall in the catchment areas of major reservoirs in the state.

The prime reason for the anomalous rainfall in 2018 is the high-frequency mixed Rossby-gravity waves in the mid-troposphere triggered by the synoptic disturbances of the tropical Pacific. These high-frequency waves manifested as cyclonic and anticyclonic circulations and dilated the wind field to establish zones of convection in the tropics, as they propagated across the Indian Ocean basin. Although the Madden–Julian oscillation phase with 20-to-40-day period has favored convection in the tropics, the high-frequency mode correlates better with the anomalous precipitation during the intervals of extreme events.

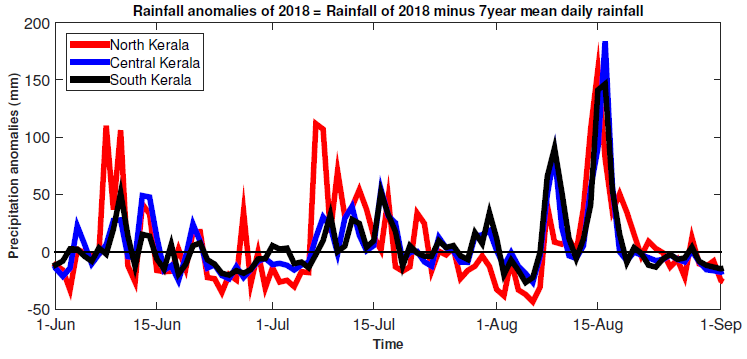
IMD daily rainfall anomalies (in millimetres) of 2018 over North, Central, and South Kerala, measured with respect to the seven-year mean precipitation.

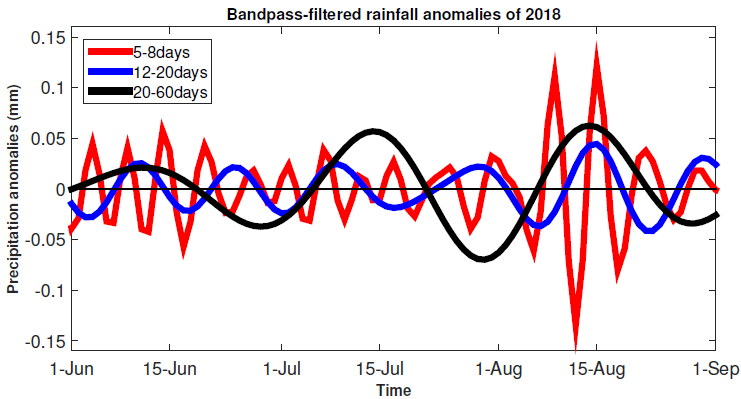
5-8 day, 12-20 day and 20-60 day bandpass-filtered IMD rainfall anomalies of 2018 averaged over the state of Kerala.

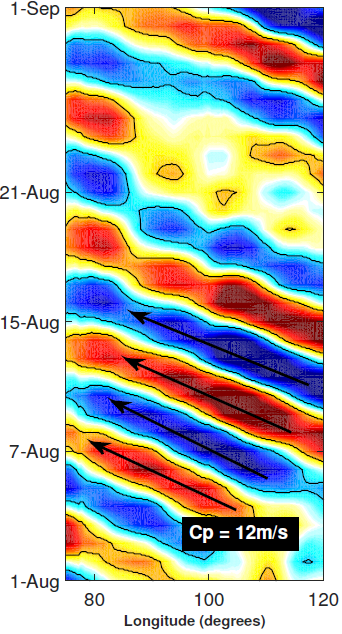
5-8 days bandpass-filtered ERA5 Meridional velocities of August 2018 meridionally averaged over the state of Kerala at the pressure level 700hPa.

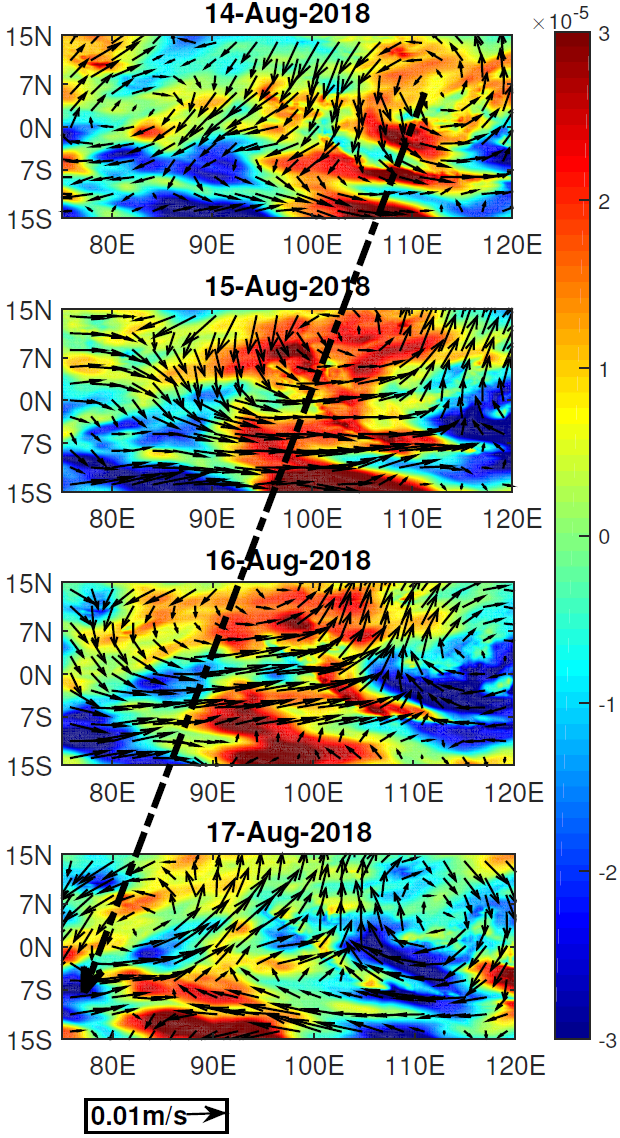
5-8 days bandpass-filtered specific humidity vertically integrated from surface (1000 hPa) to 600 hPa overlaid with 5-8days bandpass-filtered ERA5 winds at 700 hPa from 14 to 17 August 2018.

Expert bodies like the Central Water Commission have corroborated the findings by scientists from IIT Madras, Purdue University and IIT Gandhinagar.

A report by Adv. Jacob P. Alex, an advisor appointed by the Kerala high court, alleged that the devastating floods of 2018 were the result of bad dam management by the state government. All 79 dams in the state were maintained with the objective to generate hydroelectricity or irrigation and controlling flooding wasn't their purpose. "The major concern of the dam operators was to maximise reservoir levels, which conflicted with the flood control purpose for which the dams could be utilised. The 'flood cushion' of reservoirs – the storage space earmarked in dams to absorb unanticipated high flows – needed review as per the latest guidelines," Alex wrote in his report. "Sudden release of water simultaneously from different reservoirs, during extreme rainfall aggravated the damage," it said, adding that various alerts—blue, orange and red—had been issued not in accordance with the EAP guideline. "No proper follow-up action and effective precautionary steps (especially for evacuating people and accommodating them in safe location) were taken after issuance of Red Alert," it said. As of August 2024, the high court of Kerala had not accepted the report.

The government of Kerala argued in the Supreme Court that the sudden release of water from the Mullaperiyar Dam by the Tamil Nadu government was one of the reasons for the devastating flood in Kerala. The Tamil Nadu government rejected the argument, saying that Kerala suffered the deluge due to the discharge of excess water from 80 reservoirs across Kerala, spurred by heavy rains from within the state; It also argued that the flood surplus from the Idukki Dam was due mainly to the flows generated from its own independent catchment due to unprecedented heavy rainfall, while the discharge from the Mullaperiyar dam was significantly less.

== Impact ==
The flooded Mullassery Canal, Angamaly

Over 483-500 people died, 15 are missing and 140 were hospitalized, while The Economic Times reported that 33,000 people were rescued. The Kerala State Disaster Management Authority had placed the state on red alert as a result of the intense flooding. A number of water treatment plants were forced to cease pumping water, resulting in poor access to clean water, especially in northern districts of the state. Over 3,274 relief camps were opened at various locations to accommodate the flood victims. It is estimated by the National Disaster Management Authority that 1,247,496 people found shelter in such camps. The flooding affected hundreds of villages, destroyed an estimated 10,000 km (6,200 mi) of roads, and thousands of homes have been damaged or destroyed. The government cancelled Onam celebrations and reallocated the funds to relief efforts.

On 12 August, Cochin International Airport, India's fourth busiest in terms of international traffic and the busiest in the state, suspended all operations until 29 August, following runway flooding. All schools throughout the state were closed, and tourists were dissuaded or prohibited from some districts due to safety concerns. The Kochi Metro closed briefly on 16 August, and later offered free services to aid those affected by the flooding. Due to heavy rain and rising water levels the southern railway suspended train services on the Thiruvananthapuram-Kottayam-Ernakulam and Ernakulam-Shoranur-Palakkad sections.

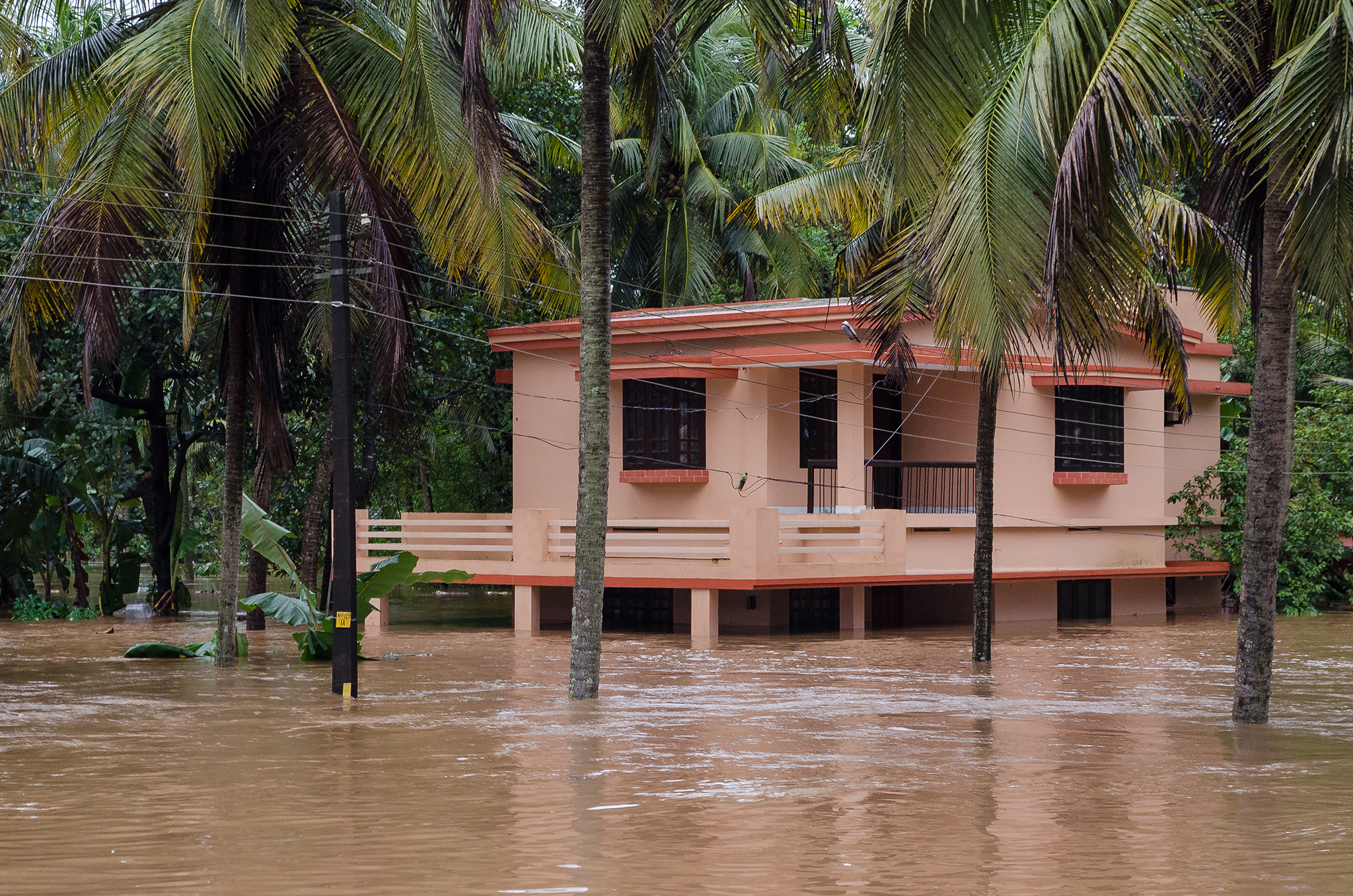
A flooded home at Companypady

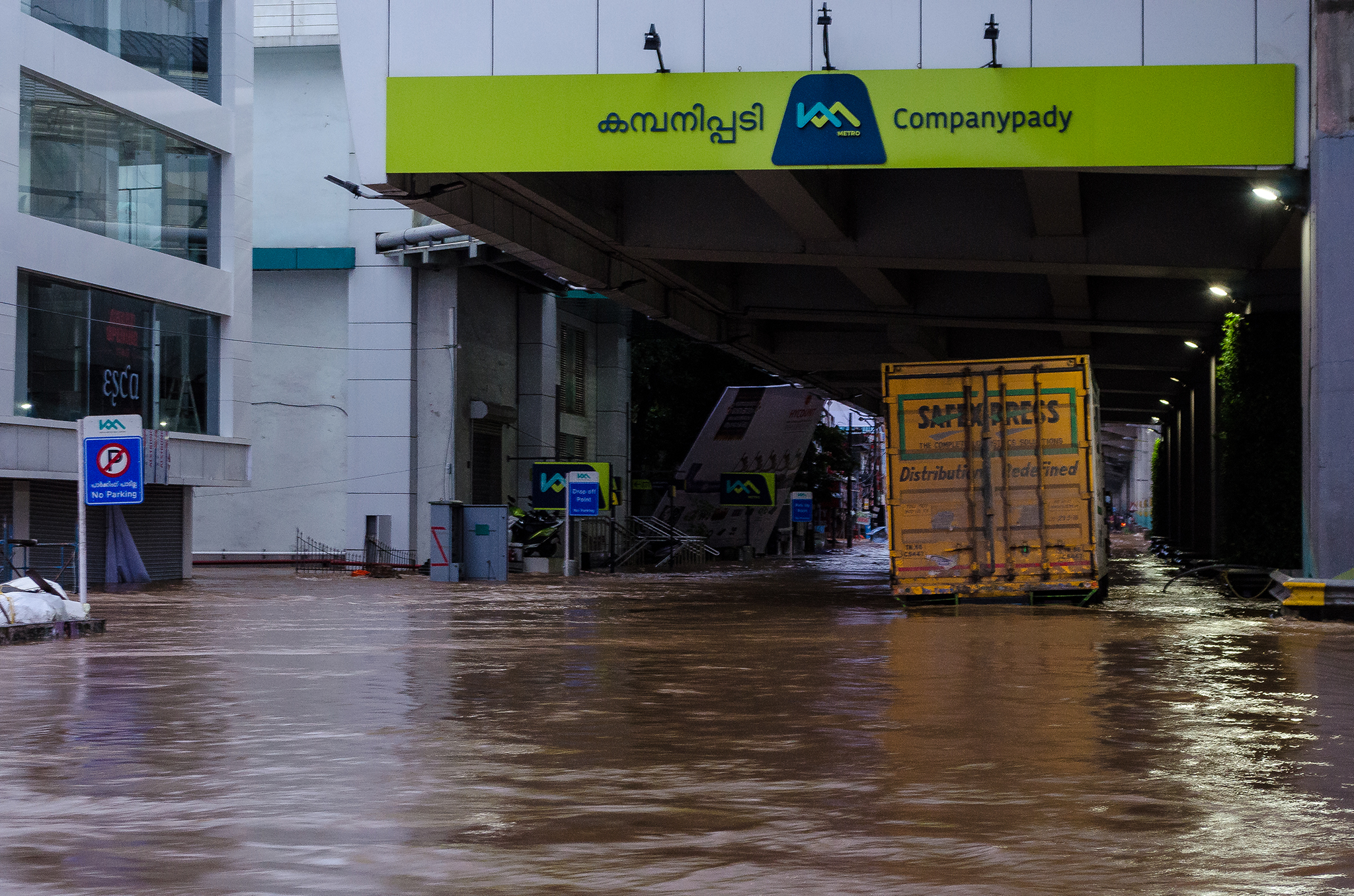
View of NH544 near Companypady metro station

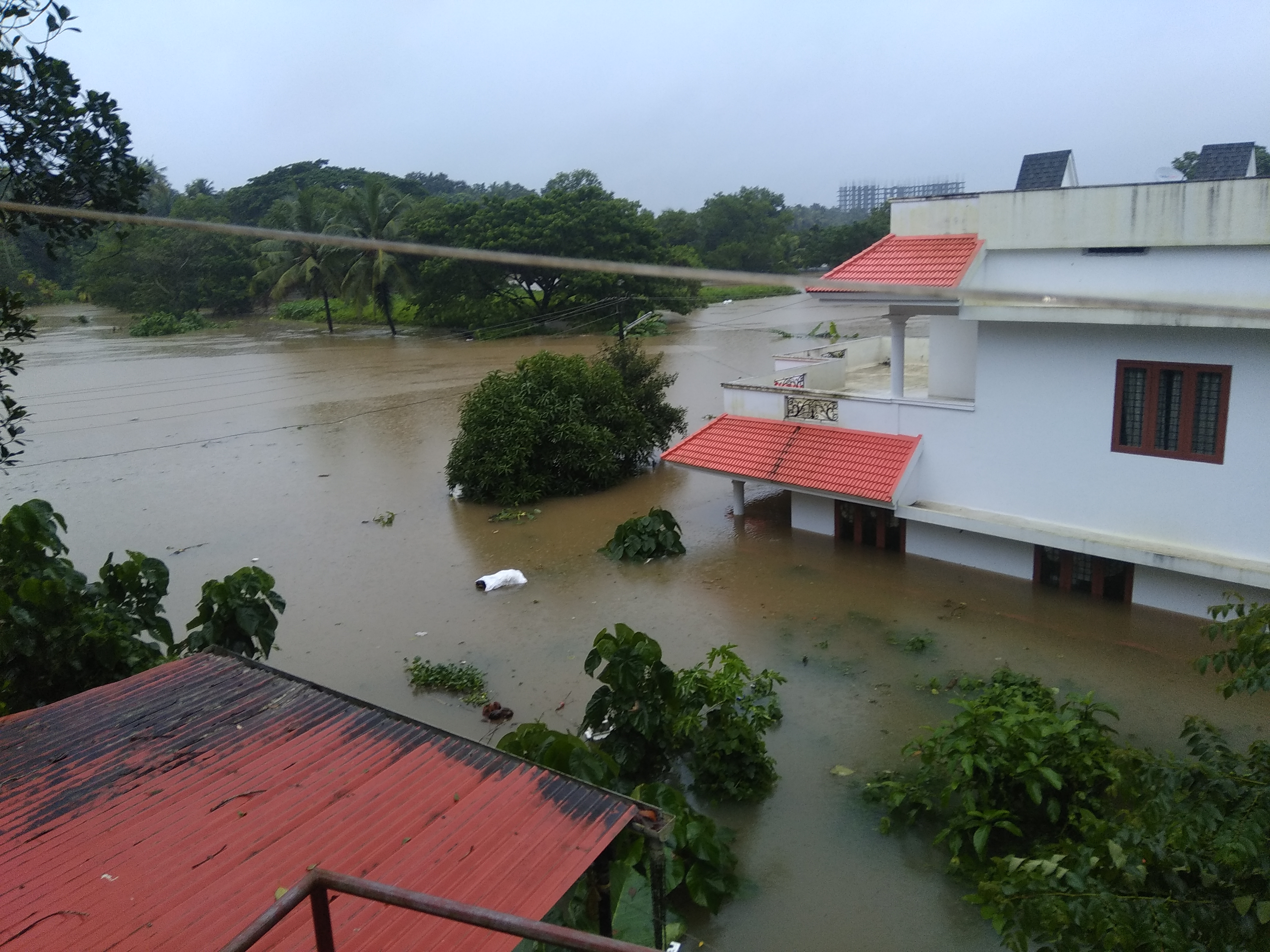
A flooded home on 16 August 2018

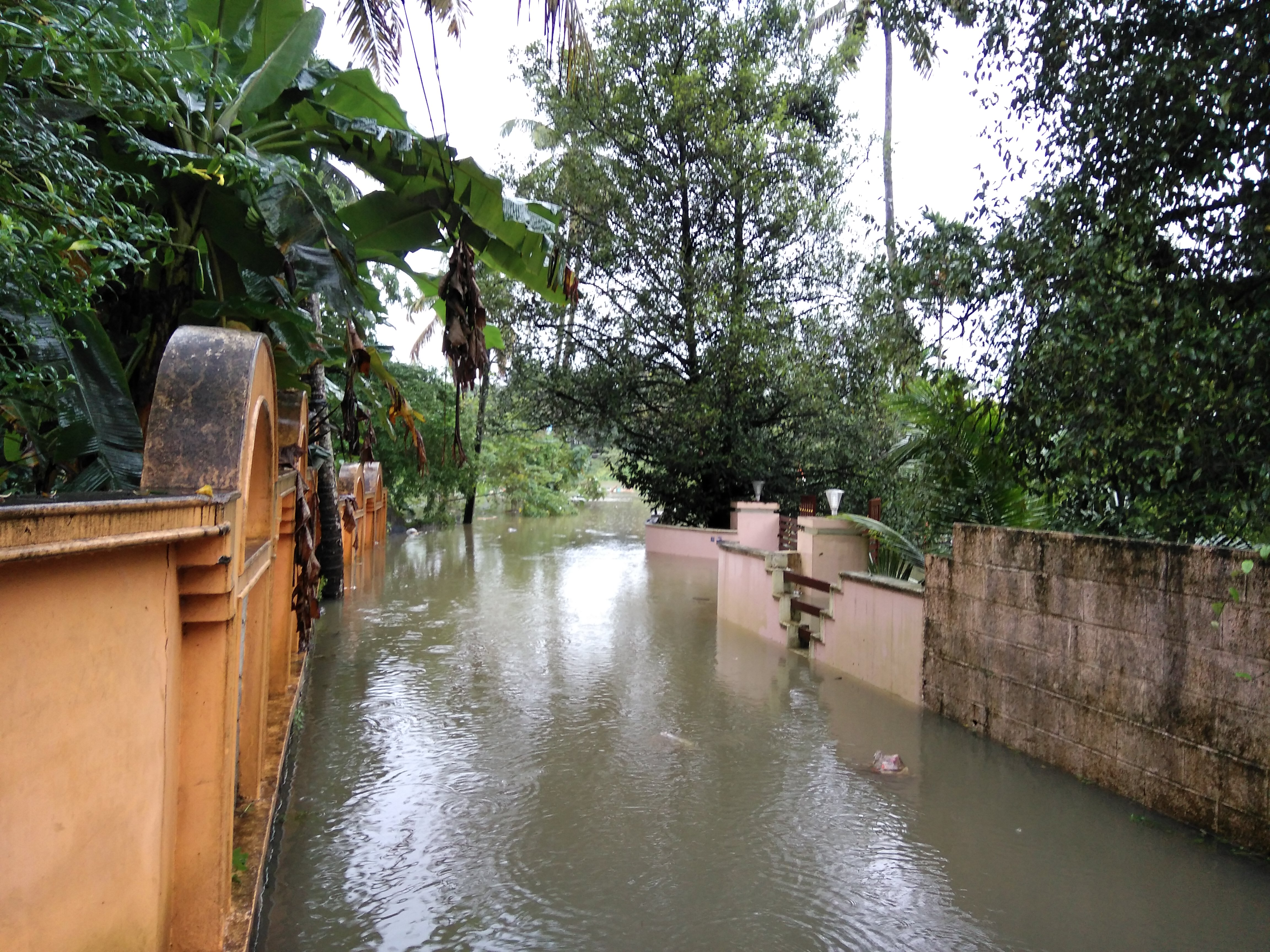
A street flooded in Kerala

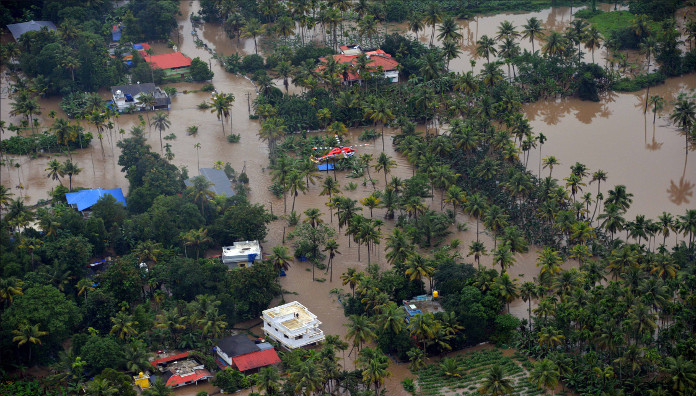
An aerial view as seen on 16 August 2018

== Rescue Operations ==
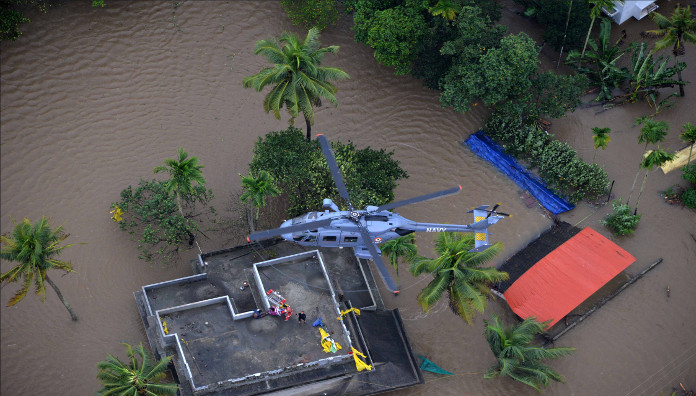
Southern Naval Command initiates Operation Madad in Kerala on 16 August 2018

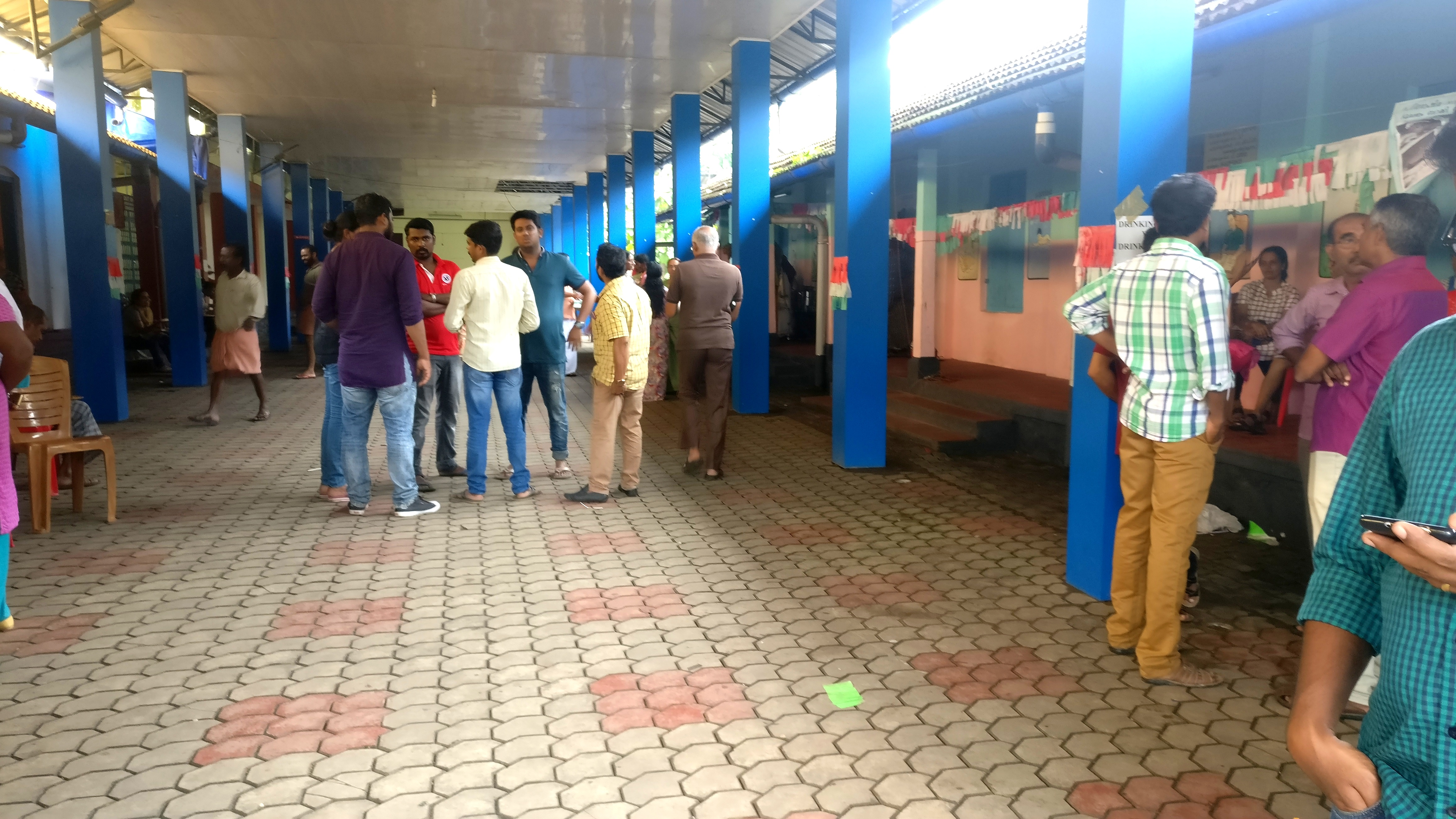
Padivattom disaster relief camp on 17 August 2018

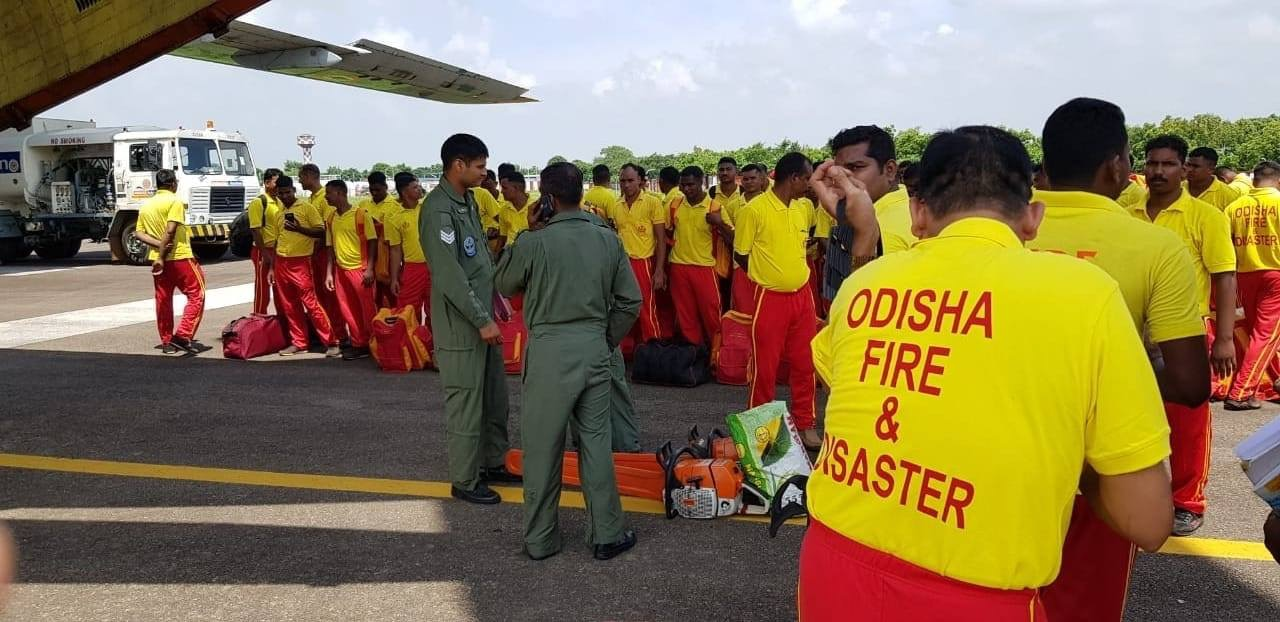
Odisha fire personnel leaving from Bhubaneswar for rescue operations in Kerala

=== Government ===
The government launched a large search and rescue operation that included aircraft, boats, rescue and medical teams, and police. The government provided supplies to those who needed help and conducted many rescue operations.

=== Public ===
WhatsApp groups sprung up as control centers that coordinated help and support across various areas. Many people volunteered to deliver supplies and materials or donated money.

==== Rescue operation by fishermen ====
According to the government, a total of 4,537 fishermen communities from Kollam and Thiruvananthapuram districts participated in the rescue operation with 669 fishing boats. They managed to rescue more than 65,000 people from various districts. Chief Minister Pinarayi Vijayan honoured the fishermen. Fisheries Minister J. Mercykutty Amma said that the government would provide financial aid to repair the fishing boats that were damaged in the rescue operations, while new ones will be provided for those boats that were completely destroyed. According to estimates, seven boats were completely destroyed, while 452 were partially destroyed.

== Relief and monetary aid ==
=== Government, NGOs, and NPOs ===
- The Government of Kerala started a donation website for flood victims. As of 7 January 2020, approximately ₹4,740 crore (US$639.68 million) was collected from the public, including organisations, corporate firms, and famous personalities.
- Prime Minister Narendra Modi announced a sum of ₹500 crore (US$73.11 million) as interim relief for Kerala on 18 August 2018. This is in addition to ₹562.45 crore (US$82.24 million) already made available in SDRF of the State and ₹100 crore (US$14.62 million) announced on 12 August 2018 by the Home Minister. The central government also said in its press release that this ₹600 crore (US$87.73 million) is only the advance assistance and that additional funds will be released by the NDRF when an inter-ministerial team visits again and assesses the damage. The central government, in one of the largest rescue operations, deployed 40 helicopters, 31 aircraft, 500 boats, 182 rescue teams and 18 medical teams of defence forces, 58 teams of NDRF and 7 companies of Central Armed Police Forces. Together they saved over 60,000 human lives.
- The European Union announced an assistance of ₹1.53 crore (€140,000) in aid funding to the Indian Red Cross Society for providing relief to flood-affected people in Kerala.
- The governments of the Maldives, Pakistan, Thailand, and Qatar extended condolences and offered humanitarian assistance and monetary aid.
- In a gesture of solidarity with the state government's flood relief efforts, the Kerala Catholic Bishops' Council (KCBC) donated ₹1 crore (US$146,221.28) to the Chief Minister's Distress Relief Fund. KCBC President and Archbishop of Thiruvananthapuram Latin Archdiocese, Bishop Dr. Soosa Pakiam, presented the contribution to the Chief Minister's office. The Archbishop also mentioned that Caritas India, the social service wing of CBCI, along with the Catholic Churches of Kerala, is undertaking special relief projects like housing to aid the victims.
- The KCBC, in its Winter Session, reviewed that as of December 2018, the Catholic Churches of Kerala have spent ₹164 crore (US$23.98 million) for flood relief and that 36.5 acres of land were mobilized for the landless with the cooperation of various dioceses and their religious congregations. The winter session reviewed rehabilitation progress the Church is carrying out for the flood victims.
- Mata Amritanandamayi Math donated ₹10 crore (US$1.46 million) to the Kerala Chief Minister's Distress Relief Fund, in addition to providing relief materials and helping in rescue operations.
- The Guruvayur Devaswom Board donated ₹5 crore (US$731,106.38) to the Chief Minister's Distress Relief Fund (CMDRF). However, on a case filed by its devotee, the Kerala High Court, in December 2020, ruled that the ₹10 crore (US$1.42 million) the state government received from the board (including donations from 2018 and 2019 floods) should be returned. The court argued that temple funds should prioritize the development of the shrine and its allied services. The Guruvayur Devaswom Board challenged this decision in the Supreme Court, which has ordered a status quo on the matter until further review.
- 37,000 volunteers from the People's Foundation, an NGO based in Calicut, with the support of the Ideal Relief Wing Kerala, cleaned 11,139 houses and conducted 494 relief camps for flood victims.
- A fundraising campaign started via the Federation of Malayalee Associations of Americas (FOMAA) 2018–2020 leadership, later migrating to Facebook, procured over 260 donors from across the world, and was able to raise enough money to build more than forty homes and dedicate various villages across districts of Kerala.
- A fundraising campaign started on Facebook by charitable organisations Knanaya Catholic Yuvajanavedhi of Chicago and Care and Share, along with a person named Arun Simon Nellamattom and others, raised and donated US$1.6 million to the Kerala Chief Minister's Distress Relief Fund.
- IsraAid, an Israeli NGO, sent relief workers to distribute supplies and assess needs for clean water, sanitation, and psychological care.
- Many Members of Parliament, Members of State Legislative Assemblies and Councils, civil servants, and Government employees across the country have also donated their one month's salary and/or allowances towards the Kerala Chief Minister's Distress Relief Fund.
- Chief Ministers of all the states (and Delhi) pledged monetary aid from their respective state funds in addition to the dispatch of various relief materials such as potable water, blankets, packed food, rice, water-purifying machines, daily-use and healthcare products. Monetary contributions are listed below:

| State/union territory | Amount | Refs |
|---|---|---|
| Andhra Pradesh | ₹10 crore (US$1.46 million) | |
| Arunachal Pradesh | ₹3 crore (US$438,663.83) | |
| Assam | ₹3 crore (US$438,663.83) | |
| Bihar | ₹10 crore (US$1.46 million) | |
| Chhattisgarh | ₹3 crore (US$438,663.83) | |
| Delhi | ₹10 crore (US$1.46 million) | |
| Goa | ₹5 crore (US$731,106.38) | |
| Gujarat | ₹10 crore (US$1.46 million) | |
| Haryana | ₹10 crore (US$1.46 million) | |
| Himachal Pradesh | ₹5 crore (US$731,106.38) | |
| Jharkhand | ₹5 crore (US$731,106.38) | |
| Karnataka | ₹10 crore (US$1.46 million) | |
| Madhya Pradesh | ₹10 crore (US$1.46 million) | |
| Maharashtra | ₹20 crore (US$2.92 million) | |
| Manipur | ₹2 crore (US$292,442.55) | |
| Meghalaya | ₹1 crore (US$146,221.28) | |
| Mizoram | ₹2 crore (US$292,442.55) | |
| Nagaland | ₹1 crore (US$146,221.28) | |
| Odisha | ₹10 crore (US$1.46 million) | |
| Puducherry | ₹1 crore (US$146,221.28) | |
| Punjab | ₹5 crore (US$731,106.38) | |
| Rajasthan | ₹10 crore (US$1.46 million) | |
| Tamil Nadu | ₹10 crore (US$1.46 million) | |
| Telangana | ₹25 crore (US$3.66 million) | |
| Tripura | ₹1 crore (US$146,221.28) | |
| Uttar Pradesh | ₹15 crore (US$2.19 million) | |
| Uttarakhand | ₹5 crore (US$731,106.38) | |
| West Bengal | ₹10 crore (US$1.46 million) | |
| Total | ₹212 crore (US$31 million) | |

=== Housing projects for flood survivors ===
| Organization | Details of no. of houses and allied services | Amount | Refs |
|---|---|---|---|
| Act On | 300 houses | ₹6 crore (US$877,327.66) | |
| Changanassery Social Service Society (CHASS)social service wing of the Archeparchy of Changanassery | Renovation of 1000 houses, constructing 1000 rainwater storage facilities, 100 water purification plants, 1000 flood-resilient toilets and waste treatment plants for households of flood hit Kuttanad region | ₹100 crore (US$14.62 million) | |
| Federation of Malayalee Associations of Americas – FOMAA | 250 houses | | |
| Joy Alukkas | 250 newly built houses each with 600sq.feet | ₹15 crore (US$2.19 million) | |
| KCARE (Kerala Cooperative Alliance to Rebuild Kerala) | Renovation /building of 1500 houses | ₹75 crore (US$10.97 million) | |
| Kerala Catholic Bishops' Council(KCBC) in association with Caritas India | Construction of 2620 new houses and its land allocation renovation of 6630 partially destroyed houses, 4226 latrines and 4744 wells | ₹250 crore (US$36.56 million) | |
| Muslim Jamaath | Rebuilding 1000 damaged houses via Chief Minister's distress relief fund | ₹50 lakh (US$73,110.64) | |
| Muthoot Group | 200 newly built houses each with 550sq.feet | ₹10 crore (US$1.46 million) | |
| Peoples Foundation | Construction of 305 houses, renovation of 888 houses, and 34 drinking water projects | ₹25 crore (US$3.66 million) | |
| Total | __ | | |

=== Corporate and individual ===
- Dr. Azad Moopen, chairman and managing director of Aster DM Healthcare, donated ₹2.5 crore (US$355,011.27) to the Kerala Chief Minister's relief fund and another ₹12.5 crore (US$1.78 million) for rebuilding houses in flood affected areas.
- Major oil companies of India, such as BPCL, HPCL, IOCL, and others, collectively donated ₹25 crore (US$3.66 million) to the Kerala Chief Minister's Distress Relief Fund, in addition to providing relief materials and helping in rescue operations.Oil and Natural Gas Corporation (ONGC) donated US$1 million to the Prime Ministers Relief Fund and sent relief teams with medical professionals and three helicopters for rescue and logistics support.
- Reliance Foundation chairperson Nita Ambani announced a donation of ₹21 crore (US$3.07 million) to the Kerala Chief Minister's Distress Relief Fund and relief materials worth around ₹50 crore (US$7.31 million).
- Adani Foundation, the CSR, sustainability, and community outreach arm of the Adani Group, has committed to providing ₹1 crore (US$146,221.28) for immediate relief, and another ₹1 crore (US$146,221.28) is earmarked for rehabilitation and resettlement.
- Star India, its parent company 21st Century Fox and their employees have collectively donated ₹5 crore (US$731,106.38).
- Canara Bank, a leading nationalised public sector bank, donated ₹5.01 crore (US$732,568.6) towards the Kerala Chief Minister's Disaster Relief Fund. Besides this, 10 tonnes of rice packets were also donated under CSR.
- Bollywood actor Sushant Singh Rajput had donated ₹1 crore (US$146,221.28) to the Kerala Chief Minister's relief fund on behalf of an Instagram fan. He also sent his team for relief activity in Kerala. Vidya Balan, Siddharth Roy Kapoor, Shah Rukh Khan, Amitabh Bachchan, Abhishek Bachchan, Alia Bhatt, Siddharth Suryanarayan, Rishi Kapoor, Vidhu Vinod Chopra, Akshay Kumar, Suriya and Resul Pookutty are others from film industry to have contributed to Kerala Chief Minister's relief fund.
- KP Hussain, chairman of Fathima Healthcare Group, has donated ₹1 crore (US$146,221.28) to the Kerala Chief Minister's relief fund, and another ₹4 crore (US$584,885.11) for medical relief aid.
- Doctor, entrepreneur, and philanthropist Shamsheer Vayalil donated ₹50 crore (US$7.31 million) for the relief of flood victims by setting up a project to fight housing, education, and healthcare issues.
- UAE-based Indian businesses have donated ₹18.85 crore (US$2.76 million) so far to Khalifa Bin Zayed Al Nahyan Foundation's relief fund. Among those to donate were Indian businessmen Yusuff Ali M.A., chairman and managing director of LuLu Group International, and Dr. B. R. Shetty, founder and chairman of NMC Health.
- Bombay High Court directed Galpha Laboratories to deposit a sum of ₹1.5 crore (US$219,331.91) towards the Kerala Chief Minister's Fund after losing a trademark infringement case filed by Glenmark Pharmaceuticals. The court initially said that Galpha Laboratories would have to pay the sum to Glenmark Pharmaceuticals. However, Glenmark Pharmaceuticals requested the court to direct Galpha Laboratories to deposit the sum in an NGO. Following this, the court directed that the money be deposited in the Kerala Chief Minister's Fund.
- Indian cricket team captain Virat Kohli, dedicated his team's test win over England at Trent Bridge to the flood victims of Kerala. The Indian team has donated match fees for Kerala flood victims.

== Response ==
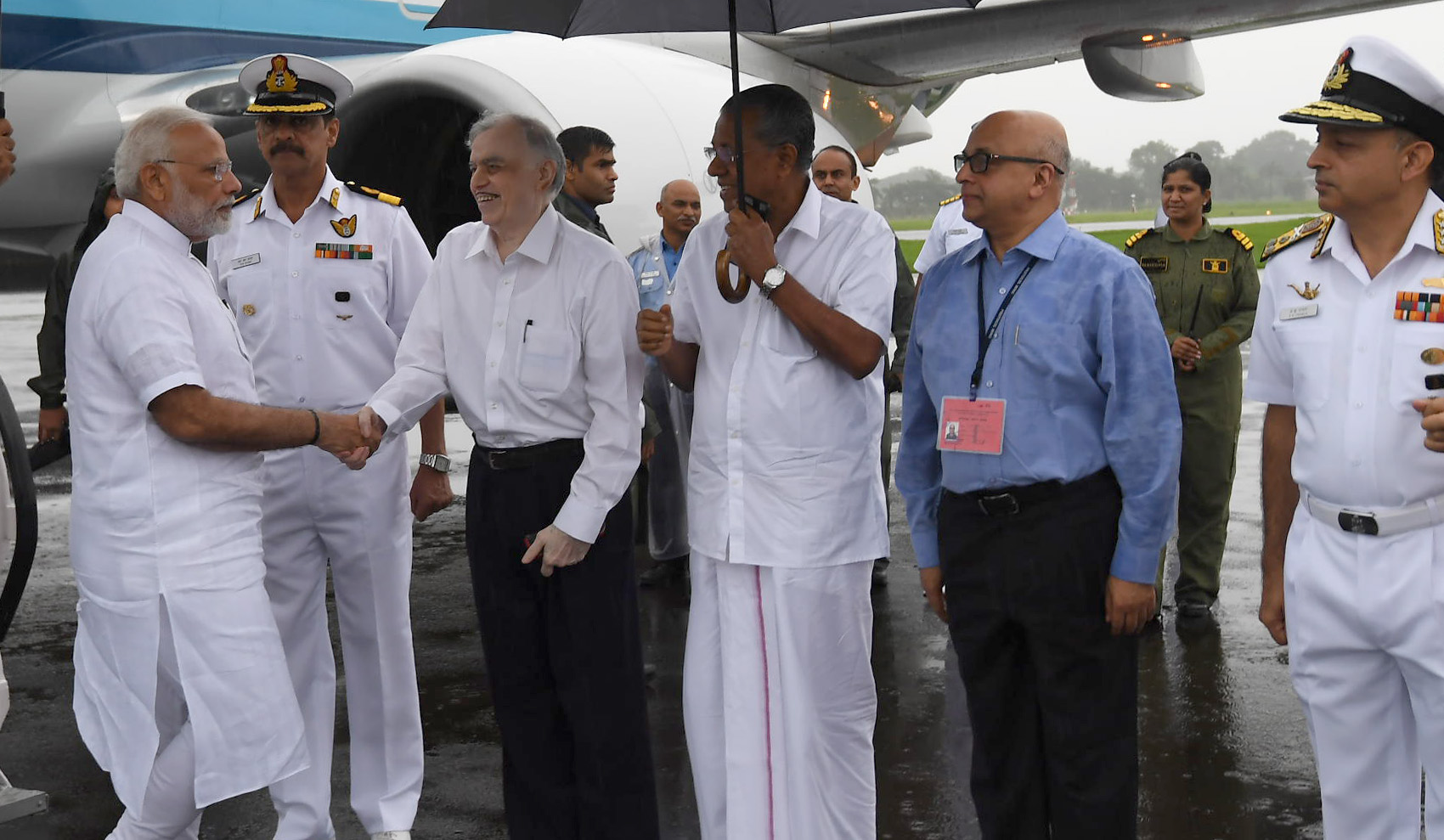
India's Prime Minister Narendra Modi being received by the Governor of Kerala P. Sathasivam and the Chief Minister of Kerala, Pinarayi Vijayan, on his arrival, in Kochi, to survey the flood-affected areas, on 18 August 2018.

At a press conference on 11 August, Chief Secretary Tom Jose said, "Things are well under control. The government is on top of the situation." Prime Minister Narendra Modi conducted an aerial survey and offered federal support to Keralites. Chief Minister Pinarayi Vijayan described the floods as "something that has never happened before in the history of Kerala."

=== International ===
The United States embassy urged its citizens to avoid traveling to the affected areas. The UAE embassy in India issues warnings for its citizens regarding the flood. The embassy also said that the weather agencies in India had given warnings regarding heavy rainfall in the southern state of Kerala. UAE's President, Sheikh Khalifa bin Zayed Al Nahyan ordered the formation of a national emergency committee to provide relief assistance to people affected by flash floods in the Indian state of Kerala.

A controversy arose from an offer of US$100 million in aid from the UAE. The Kerala Chief Minister's office wrote, "CM Pinarayi Vijayan informed that the United Arab Emirates will provide Kerala an assistance of ₹700 Crore. Kerala has a special relationship with the UAE, which is a home away from home for Malayalees. We express our gratitude to the UAE for their support. #KeralaFloodRelief". The Ministry of External Affairs of India clarified that they received no such offer for financial help from any country, and the UAE Ambassador to India declared that no official announcement had been made.

== Rainfall data ==
=== Rainfall departures ===
Week by week departures from normal:

View source data.

=== Cumulative rainfall by district ===
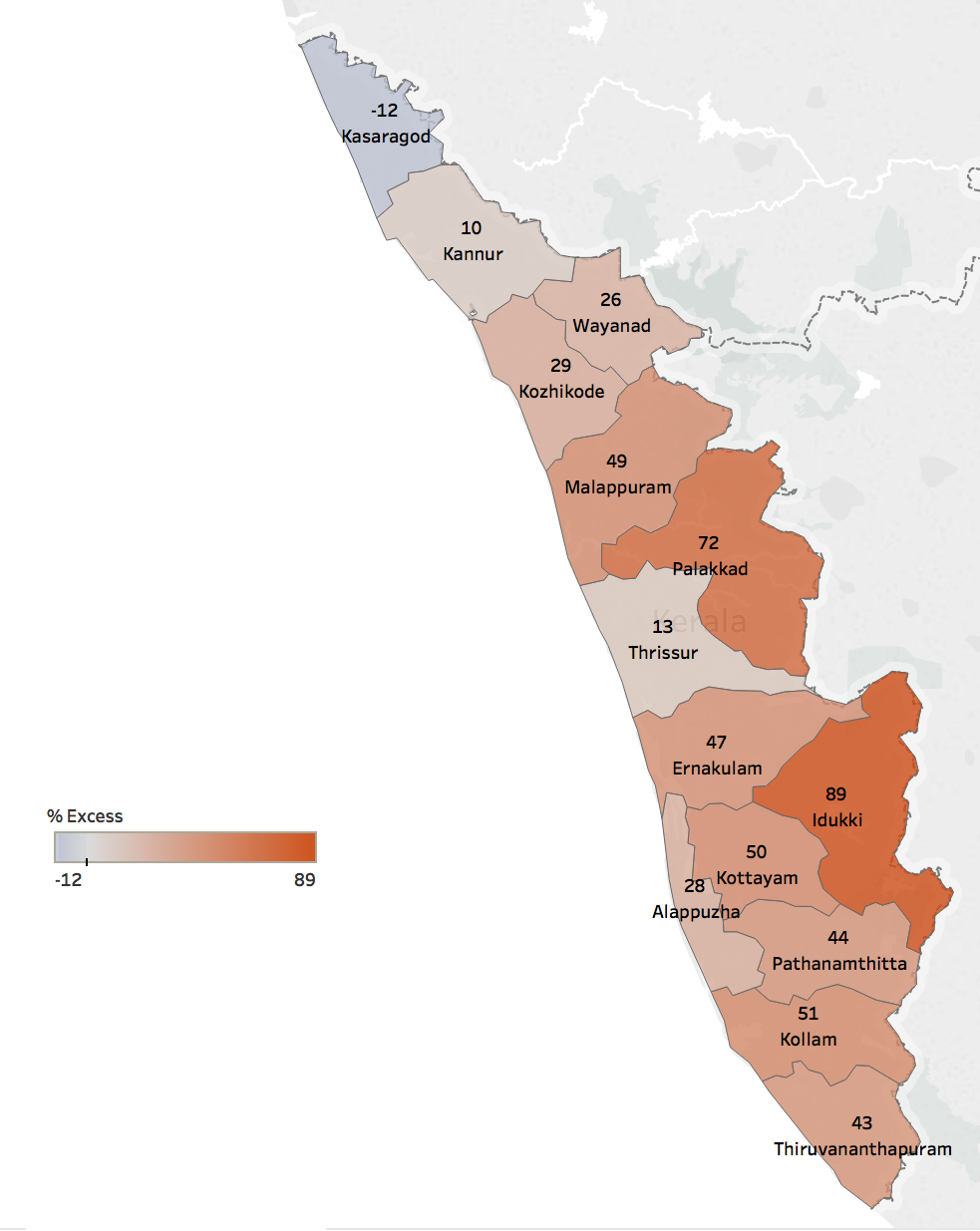
1 June 2018 – 22 August 2018

Percentage increase in rainfall compared to normal.

(1 June 2018 – 17 August 2018)
| District | Rainfall (mm) | Normal (mm) | % increase |
|---|---|---|---|
| Alappuzha | 1648.1 | 1309.5 | 20.54% |
| Ernakulam | 2305.9 | 1606.0 | 43.58% |
| Idukki | 3211.1 | 1749.1 | 83.58% |
| Kannur | 2450.9 | 2234.9 | 9.66% |
| Kasaragod | 2549.94 | 2489.1 | -2.44% |
| Kollam | 1427.3 | 985.4 | 44.84% |
| Kottayam | 2137.6 | 1452.6 | 32.04% |
| Kozhikode | 2796.4 | 2156.5 | 22.80% |
| Malappuram | 2529.8 | 1687.3 | 49.93% |
| Palakkad | 2135.0 | 1254.2 | 70.22% |
| Pathanamthitta | 1762.7 | 1287.5 | 36.90% |
| Thiruvananthapuram | 920.8 | 643.0 | 43.07% |
| Thrissur | 1894.5 | 1738.2 | 8.99% |
| Wayanad | 2676.8 | 2167.2 | 23.51% |
| Kerala | 2226.4 | 1620.0 | 37.43% |

== Analysis by Central Water Commission ==
=== Kerala as a whole ===
According to a study by the Central Water Commission, the average cumulative rainfall of 3 days from 15 to 17 August 2018 was about 414 mm. This was almost of the same order as that of rainfall of Devikulam, which occurred during 16–18 July 1924. Assuming a runoff coefficient of 0.75, the runoff generated by 3 days of intense rainfall was estimated to be 12057 MCM for the entire state of Kerala. This huge runoff was beyond the carrying capacity of most of the rivers in Kerala, resulting in bank overflows from most of the rivers. The total catchment area tapped by dams in Kerala, excluding barrages, is about 6,610 km^{2} (2,552 sq mi). The runoff generated from the catchment tapped by these dams during the period 15–17 August 2018 was estimated at 2.19 BCM, out of a total runoff of 12 BCM for the whole of Kerala. As per the study, with a total live storage in the state of 5.8 BCM and assuming a live storage availability of 20% on 14 August 2018, the extent of available flood moderation would have only been 1.16 BCM against an estimated inflow of 2.19 BCM. It was therefore essential to make releases from the reservoirs.

The study stated that the dams in Kerala neither added to the flood nor helped in the reduction of the flood, as most of the dams were already at or very close to FRL on 14 August 2018. Even if the reservoirs had been a few feet below FL, the flooding conditions would not have changed much as the heavy rainfall continued for 3–4 days. It would have been necessary to release water from the reservoirs after the first day of heavy rainfall.

The study concluded it would be necessary to review the rule curves of all reservoirs in Kerala, especially those with a live storage capacity of more than 200 MCM. This would help to create a dynamic flood cushion for moderating floods.

=== Periyar Basin ===
From 15 to 17 August 2018, the rainfall depth realized in the Periyar basin was 588 mm. The maximum discharge passing through the Periyar at Neeleeswaram was 8800 m³/sec, recorded at 16 August 15:00 hrs, according to the CWC's Neeleeswaram G&D site. The major storage reservoirs in the Periyar basin are the Idukki reservoir (1.4 BCM) and the Idamalayar reservoir (1.1 BCM). The peak release on 16 August 2018 from the Idukki reservoir was 1500 m³/sec against an inflow of 2532 m³/sec, thus achieving a flood moderation of 1032 m³/sec. The release from Idamalayar on 16 August 2018 was 963 m³/sec against an inflow of 1164 m³/sec.

The discharge at Neeleshwaram on 17 August 2018 was 8600 m³/sec. The releases from the Idukki and Idamalayar reservoirs were 1500 m³/sec (with an inflow of 1610 m³/sec) and 1272 m³/sec (with an inflow of 1007 m³/sec). CWC's analysis found that the releases of water were controlled releases, as the discharge capacity of the Idukki and Idamalayar dams is 5013 m³/sec and 3012 m³/sec, respectively.

== Immediate drought after the flood ==
A few days after receiving one of the highest rainfall in the century, Kerala was caught under the threat of severe drought. Water level in wells, ponds, and rivers recorded the lowest levels, and some wells even collapsed. Chief minister Pinarayi Vijayan directed the state council for Science, Technology & Environment to carry out studies on the phenomenon after floods across the state and suggest possible solutions to the problem.

A.B. Anita, executive director of the Centre for Water Resource Development Management (CWRDM), an autonomous research institution under the state government, said heavy run-off of the top soil in the upland areas and the siltation in the rivers were the reasons for the falling water level. The top soil in the hills and upland areas was removed in the flash floods to a depth of up to two metres in many places. As the top soil was shaved off, it ruined the hills' capacity to sponge in rainwater, she said. Ms. Anita cited ecological destruction caused by deforestation, harmful land use in the upland areas, and sand mining in the streams and rivers as having contributed to the top soil run-off and siltation. This was exacerbated by the impact of climate change at the macro level.

Echoing her views, experts at the National Institute of Technology, Calicut, (NIT-C) said it was usual for the water level in the rivers and domestic wells to fall after fluvial floods. "Normally, a river flows through the sand of its own bearing till the mouth. However, this time the discharge has been full, taking the sand and the rocks in the youth stage along with the floods. So the water level in the rivers comes down. And when the river water level is reduced, the groundwater table also does not get replenished since the rivers and groundwater table are connected," said K. Saseendran, a geologist and professor at the NIT-C.

== In popular culture ==
In April 2023, the Malayalam-language survival thriller film 2018: Everyone is a hero, which is based on the 2018 Kerala floods, was released.

== See also ==
- Kerala floods
- 1341 Floods in Kerala
- 2019 Kerala floods
- 2020 Kerala floods
- 2018 in Kerala
- 2004 Indian Ocean earthquake and tsunami
- 2026 Kerala floods
