= Sally Varma =

Indian animal rights activist

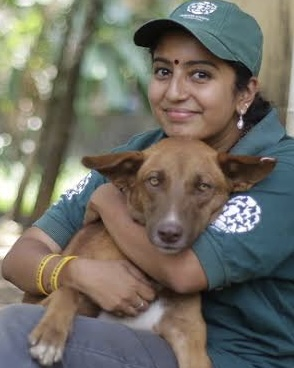
- Born: 28 December 1984 (age 41); Mangalore
- Education: Graduate in Functional English and Journalism.
- Alma mater: Nirmalamatha Central School, Vimala College, Thrissur
- Occupations: Senior Specialist, Humane Society International/India
- Years active: 2014–present

Sally Varma (born 28 December 1984) is an Indian animal welfare activist. She is known primarily for her animal welfare activities in the Indian state of Kerala. She works with the Humane Society International India, in spreading awareness among public and government representatives on animal welfare. In 2016, Sally was recognized as one of the 100 women achievers in India in the category of Animal Welfare by the Ministry of Women and Child Development, Government of India and in 2019, she was selected as one of the 50 influential people in Kerala by the KeralaInsider portal.

== Animal welfare work ==
Sally worked as a volunteer with PAWS Thrissur, an animal welfare organization in the city of Thrissur, Kerala from 2012. Later in 2015, she joined as the Kerala State Outreach Coordinator of Humane Society International/India. She is currently the Senior Specialist in the Farm Animal Protection Campaign of the organisation, and works on sensitising the public on animal agriculture, its relation to climate change and Sustainable Development Goals of the United Nations and promoting plant based food as a sustainable choice of living. Her work for the protection of street dogs and against the cruelty to animals in Kerala has received great attention in Kerala. The Government of Kerala recognised her for the efforts during the Kerala Floods of 2018 and 2019. She regularly conducts awareness programmes in schools/colleges for students and is a TedX speaker focussing on sensitising the public against animal cruelty and instilling compassion in the society.

== Awards and recognition ==
- 100 Women Achievers - Ministry of Women and Child Development, Government of India - 2016
- 50 most influential people of Kerala - KeralaInsider portal - 2019
