= Malnutrition in Kerala =

The severity of hunger and malnutrition in Kerala is the lowest in India, according to the India State Hunger Index published by the International Food Policy Research Institute.

According to the India State Hunger Index:

- 9% of children in Kerala are underweight.
- 5.6% of the total population are undernourished
- Infant mortality rate in Kerala is 0.6%: this figure is the lowest among Indian states

== See also ==
- Malnutrition in India
