= 2026 Kerala floods =

Natural disaster in Kerala, India

- Disaster of Kerala
- Date: August 1 2026 - August 10 2026
- Location: Kerala, India
- Cause: Heavy rain Discharges; Landslide
- Deaths: 28 confirmed, 4 missing

The 2026 Kerala floods are a series of devastating flash floods and landslides that struck the southwestern Indian state of Kerala beginning in late July 2026. Following a prolonged dry period with a 34% monsoon rainfall deficit during June and July, an offshore trough and localized atmospheric depressions combined to trigger extreme, localized precipitation across the state. On 1 August 2026, parts of central and southern Kerala experienced near-cloudburst conditions, with single-day rain totals exceeding 300 mm.

The disaster has resulted at least Twenty eight confirmed fatalities, four missing individuals, and extensive structural damage. Rivers such as the Pamba, Manimala, and Meenachil have overflowed their banks, flooding major towns, blocking major transport routes.The 2026 Kerala floods are a series of devastating flash floods and landslides that struck the southwestern Indian state of Kerala beginning in late July 2026. Following a prolonged dry period with a 34% monsoon rainfall deficit during June and July, an offshore trough and localized atmospheric depressions combined to trigger extreme, localized precipitation across the state. On 1 August 2026, parts of central and southern Kerala experienced exceptionally intense rainfall, with several locations recording more than 300 mm in a single day. In Pathanamthitta district, Vadasserikkara recorded 361 mm, while Athikkayam and Angamoozhy recorded 357 mm and 307 mm, respectively, contributing to severe flash flooding and landslides in the Pamba river basin and surrounding highland areas.

== See also ==
- 2018 Kerala floods
- 2019 Kerala floods
- 2020 Kerala floods
