= Vimal Mishra =

Academic, scientist

- Citizenship: Indian
- Education: (PhD) Purdue University, (M.Tech) IIT Kharagpur and (B.Tech) Chandra Shekhar Azad University of Agriculture and Technology
- Alma mater: Purdue University
- Occupations: Academician, Researcher
- Employer(s): IIT Gandhinagar, Gandhinagar, Gujarat, India.
- Title: Prof.

Vimal Mishra is an academic, researcher and climate scientist. He is a Vikram Sarabhai Chair Professor at the Indian Institute of Technology Gandhinagar, India. His research focuses on Climate variability and change, land-atmospheric interactions, land surface hydrological modelling, operational hydrology to monitor and predict hydrologic extremes, and hydroclimatic extremes and their physical understanding (droughts, floods, and heatwaves). For his research work, he was awarded Shanti Swarup Bhatnagar Prize, in 2022 by the Council of Scientific & Industrial Research, India. He was the sole awardee in the Earth, Atmosphere, Ocean, and Planetary Sciences category in 2022 for this prize.

== Education ==
Mishra completed his bachelor's in technology in Agricultural Engineering from Chandra Shekhar Azad University of Agriculture and Technology, Kanpur, followed by master's in technology from Indian Institute of Technology Kharagpur. He completed his PhD from Purdue University, West Lafayette, USA. His dissertation title was “Understanding impacts of historic climate variability and climate change on lakes in the Great Lakes Region.”

== Career ==
He started his career as a Post-Doctoral Research Associate at the University of Washington-Seattle, Washington where he served for two years. Coming back to India, he joined as an assistant professor at the Indian Institute of Technology, Gandhinagar. He is currently serving as a Vikram Sarabhai Chair Professor, lead researcher at IIT Gandhinagar.

Prof. Mishra is a Fellow of American Geophysical Union (AGU), Fellow of Indian Academy of Sciences, The National Academy of Sciences, India (NASI), Indian National Science Academy, Indian Meteorological Society (IMS), a member of other reputed organizations and committees.

Prof. Mishra's lab at IITGN is reported to make a significant contribution to developing real-time monitoring and prediction systems for droughts and floods in India. He is credited with developing and transferring an operational platform for real-time monitoring and forecasting of land surface hydrology products to the India Meteorological Department (IMD). The India Drought Monitor, a platform he developed, provides real-time information and forecasts on drought.

A study conducted by Prof. Mishra and his team on “Drought and Famine in India, 1870–2016”, published in the Geophysical Research Letters Journal, provided scientific backing for the argument that Winston Churchill's policies played a significant role in contributing to the 1943 catastrophe, The Bengal famine, that claimed 3 million Indian lives.

He is also a lead author for India's Climate Research Agenda: 2030 and beyond. He was a contributing author of the Intergovernmental Panel on Climate Change (IPCC). He served as an expert in the Scoping Meeting of IPCC AR7.

He is on editorial board as an editor, associate editor of various journals such as Earth's Future (AGU), Scientific Data (Nature Publishing Group), Journal of Hydrology, Frontiers in Earth Sciences, Frontiers in Climate, Remote Sensing of Earth Systems Science (Springer), and other journals.

== Awards ==
Prof. Mishra received Shanti Swarup Bhatnagar Prize for his contributions in 2022. American Geophysical Union (AGU) Devendra Lal Memorial Medal for his research and contributions to Earth Sciences.

== Publications ==
He has over 150 peer-reviewed journal articles, published in reputed journals such as Nature Geoscience, Water Resources Research, Nature Reviews Earth and Environment, Journal of Geophysical Research, Earth's Future, Environmental Research Letters, and other leading journals.

Some of the journal articles are as follows:

- D. Singh Chuphal,K. Thirumalai, & V. Mishra, Recent drying of the Ganga River is unprecedented in the last 1,300 years, Proc. Natl. Acad. Sci. U.S.A. 122 (40) e2424613122, https://doi.org/10.1073/pnas.2424613122 (2025).
- Asoka, A., Gleeson, T., Wada, Y., & Mishra, V. (2017). Relative contribution of monsoon precipitation and pumping to changes in groundwater storage in India. Nature Geoscience, 10(2), 109–117. doi:10.1038/ngeo28699
- Mishra, V., Ambika, A. K., Asoka, A., Aadhar, S., Buzan, J., Kumar, R., & Huber, M. (2020). Moist heat stress extremes in India enhanced by irrigation. Nature Geoscience, 13(11), 722–728. doi:10.1038/s41561-020-00650-8
- Shah, D., & Mishra, V. (2020b). Integrated Drought Index (IDI) for Drought Monitoring and Assessment in India. Water Resources Research, 56(2), e2019WR026284 doi:10.1029/2019WR026284
- Shah, R. D., & Mishra, V. (2015a). Development of an experimental near-real-time drought monitor for India. Journal of Hydrometeorology, 16(1), 327–345. doi:10.1175/JHM-D-14-0041.1
- Nanditha, J., & Mishra, V. (2022a). Multiday precipitation is a prominent driver of floods in Indian river basins. Water Resources Research, 58(7), e2022WR032723. doi:10.1029/2022WR03272
