= 1341 Kerala floods =

Extreme weather event in medieval Kerala

The 1341 Kerala Floods (also referred to as the 1341 Periyar River Floods) refer to a possible extreme weather event — most likely a deluge — that occurred in the year 1341 CE in present-day Kerala, on the Malabar Coast of southern India, along the Periyar River. No direct historical accounts of this flood survive today. Present-day knowledge about the event is based primarily on references to a calendar known as the "Puthuvype Era" or "Era of the New Deposit", which begins in 1341 CE. Understanding of the flood is further supported by findings from the Pattanam archaeological excavation in the Kodungallur-North Paravur region near Cochin, as well as geological studies of Vypin Island and the Fort Kochi area.

It is widely believed that excessive siltation, caused by runoff from the Western Ghats through the Periyar River during the floods, led to a change in the Periyar's course and the destruction of the early historic natural port of Muziris (Muchiri). The accretion following the deluge perhaps brought about significant changes to the coastline between Alappuzha and Kodungallur, resulting in the formation of new land masses such as Vypin Island and extensive soil deposits in the Panangad-Kumbalam region. Historians also believe the floods played a major role in the formation of Cochin Port and the estuary on the Vembanad.

== See also ==
- Kerala floods (disambiguation)
