= 2019 Indian floods =

Floods in India in 2019

The 2019 Indian floods were a series of floods that affected over thirteen states in late July and early August 2019, due to excessive rains. At least 200 people died and about a million people were displaced. Karnataka and Maharashtra were the most severely affected states. People died but many were rescued with the help of the Indian Navy.

It was the heaviest monsoon in the last 25 years. More than 1600 people died between June and October 2019.

Thirteen states of India were affected by floods due to heavy rains in July–September 2019. News reports later stated that there were 500 people missing and 1000 killed, with people losing their homes. Many crop lands were destroyed resulting in starvation.

== Kerala ==
Malappuram, Kozhikode, Wayanad, Ernakulam, Idukki, Thrissur, Palakkad, Kannur and Kasargod districts are worst affected. Over one hundred thousand people were evacuated to a total of 1111 relief camps, 101 died and seven people went missing. Kochi Airport was closed due to water logging.

== Gujarat ==
Central and South Gujarat were worst affected due to heavy rains. 26 of 30 sluice gates of Sardar Sarovar dam on the Narmada river were opened to release water. Vadodara city was flooded. 18 teams of NDRF (National Disaster Response Force) and 11 teams of SDRF (State Disaster Response Force were deployed.

== Karnataka ==
North, coastal and Malnad districts were worst affected. Other affected districts include Bagalkot, Vijayapura, Raichur, Yadgiri, Uttara Kannada, South Kannada, Shivamogga, Kodagu, and Chikkamagalur. At least 24 died.

More than 2,00,000 people were evacuated and more than 2200 rescue personnel were deployed.

== Maharashtra ==
The floods in Six districts of Western Maharashtra affected over 4.24 hundred thousand people. About 4,00,000 people were evacuated and 30 people died in the rain-related incidents. The government announced the flood relief compensation of Rs 15,000 to each affected family in cities and Rs 10,000 in villages. The flood gates of Almatti dam were opened and the NH 4 (Mumbai-Bengaluru National Highway) was closed after a landslide stranding about 18,000 vehicles on the highway.

70 teams comprising NDRF, Navy, Coast Guard, and State Disaster Response Force (SDRF) personnel were deployed.

It was the second-heaviest rainfall in Mumbai in the last 25 years, according to a tweet by Maharashtra's ex-chief minister, Devendra Fadnavis.

Maharashtra experienced heavy rainfall in 2019, particularly affecting the districts of Kolhapur, Sangli (the worst-hit), Satara, Thane, Palghar, and Pune.

== Madhya Pradesh ==
Heavy rains flooded the Narmada river. Sluice gates of seven out of 28 dams in the state were opened to release the waters. Around 1000 people were evacuated. One death was reported while several others are missing. Dhar and Barwani districts were the most affected.

== Tamil Nadu ==
The Nilgiris district was the worst affected. More than 1700 people were evacuated and around 500 personnel of NDRF and SDRF were deployed. At least five people died and the state government announced a relief of Rs 10 hundred thousand each to their families.

== Goa ==
Pernem, Bicholim and Bardez talukas were the worst affected in Goa. Several villages in North Goa were inundated due to heavy rains and water released from the Tilari dam. In this disaster, 150 families were evacuated.

== Odisha ==
Odisha was flooded by heavy rains in the first week of August. From this, three died and two went missing in the floods. About 1,30,000 people in 1012 villages and 5 cities in 9 districts were affected. Kalahandi and Rayagada districts were the worst affected in Odisha. More than 14,000 people were evacuated to shelters from low-lying regions. More than 2000 houses were damaged. Seven teams of SDRF and fire personnel were deployed.

== Andhra Pradesh ==
Over 74,000 people in East Godavari and West Godavari districts were affected due to flooding from the Godavari river. 17,632 people were evacuated.

== Pune ==
In September, heavy rainfall in the city with more than 16 centimeters of rain, causing the Khadakwasla dam to hold excessive water. Water discharged from the dam caused the Mutha river to overflow and flood the area. Nazare dam near Saswad also experienced heavy rainfall, leading to a similar high discharge of water into the Karha river and flooding its immediate area.

== Punjab ==
Following heavy rains and the release of water from the Bhakra Dam, the swollen river Sutlej and its tributaries flooded villages in several areas, causing extensive damage to crops, especially paddy, and houses in low-lying areas. Over 300 villages have been affected by August 31, 2019.

== Assam and Bihar ==
Heavy-to-very-heavy rainfall events during July 5–16 resulted in severe flooding over Bihar and Assam and caused huge damage in the form of life and property. Discharge from Kosi and Brahmaputra rivers combined with heavy cumulative rainfall from multiple rainy episodes during July 5–16 resulted in severe flooding over Assam and Bihar causing losses to life and property. Bihar suffered floods again in September—October 2019.

== Relief and rescue ==
More than 5,300 personnel of the National Disaster Response Force (NDRF) were deployed for relief and rescue missions along with personnel of State Disaster Response Force (SDRF) and local police in each state. Several columns of Indian Armed Forces were also deployed. The NDRF rescued over 42,000 people in six states (Kerala, Karnataka, Maharashtra, Andhra Pradesh, Madhya Pradesh, and Gujarat).
