= 2024 Wayanad landslides =

Landslides in Kerala, India

Wayanad Landslides 2024
- Wayanad landslides (Kerala) Wayanad landslides (India)
- Date: 30 July 2024
- Time: 02:17–04:30 (IST)
- Location: Punjirimattom, Mundakkai, Chooralmala, and Vellarimala villages in Meppadi Panchayat, Vythiri taluk, Wayanad district, Kerala, India; 11°46′54″N 76°13′58″E
- Type: Landslide and Flash flood
- Cause: Heavy rain
- Outcome: Loss of human lives and properties
- Deaths: 420
- Injuries: 397
- Missing: 47
- Property damage: ₹1,200 crore (US$120 million)
- Displaced: 10,000

A series of landslides occurred in Punjirimattom, Mundakkai, Chooralmala, and Vellarimala villages in Meppadi panchayat, Vythiri taluk in Wayanad district, Kerala, India in the early hours of 30 July 2024. The landslides were caused by heavy rains that caused hillsides to collapse onto the areas below. The disaster was one of the deadliest in Kerala's history, with reports of 420 fatalities, 397 injuries, and 118 people missing. Deforestation, seismic sensitivity, poor building construction, and global warming have been identified as possible causes for the landslides and fatalities.

Many government agencies such as the armed forces, the National Disaster Response Force (NDRF), fire and rescue services, and forest and wildlife authorities, as well as volunteers, launched a large-scale rescue mission to search for survivors.

== Background ==
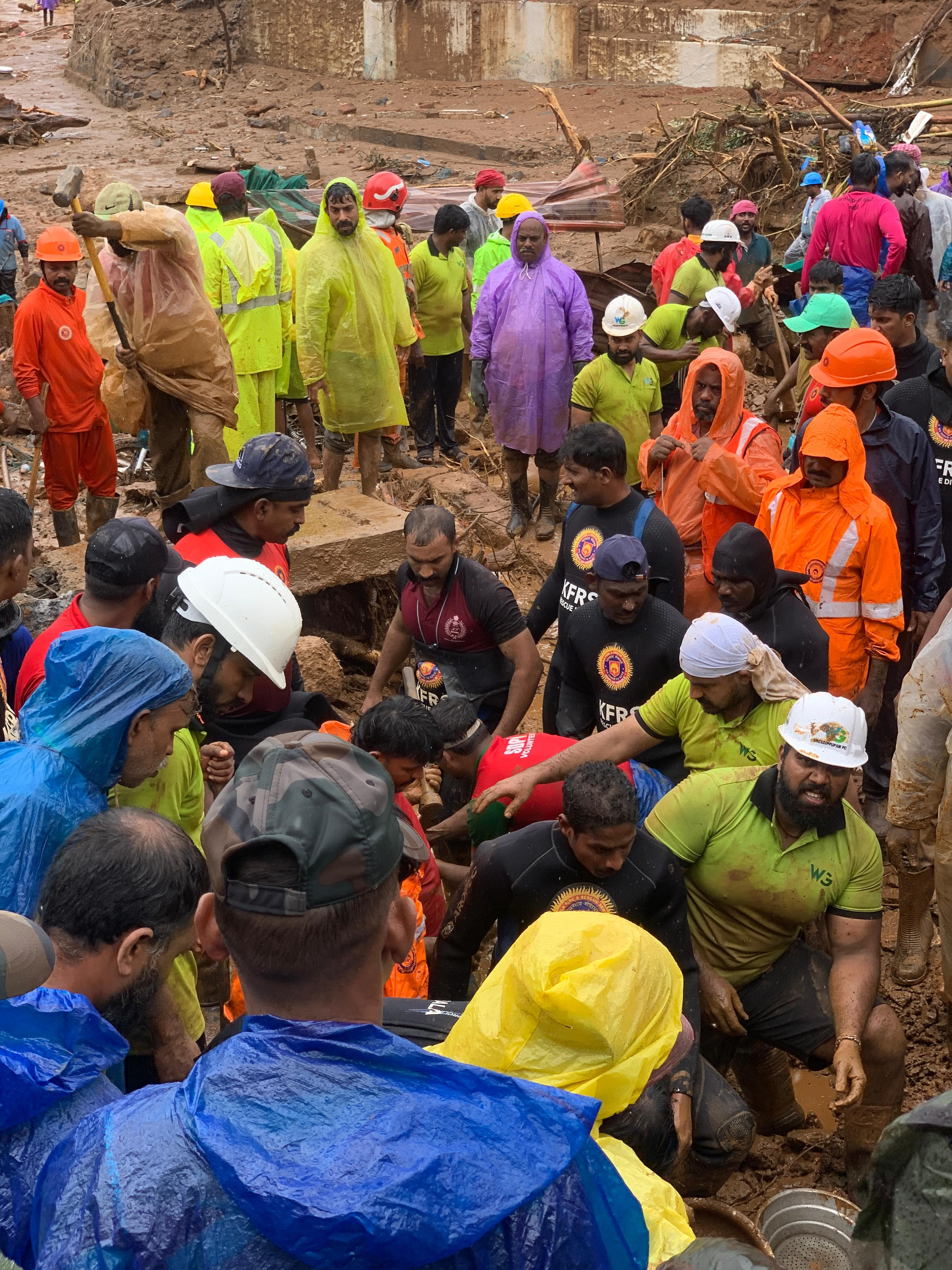
Rescue operation at the Wayanad landslide site

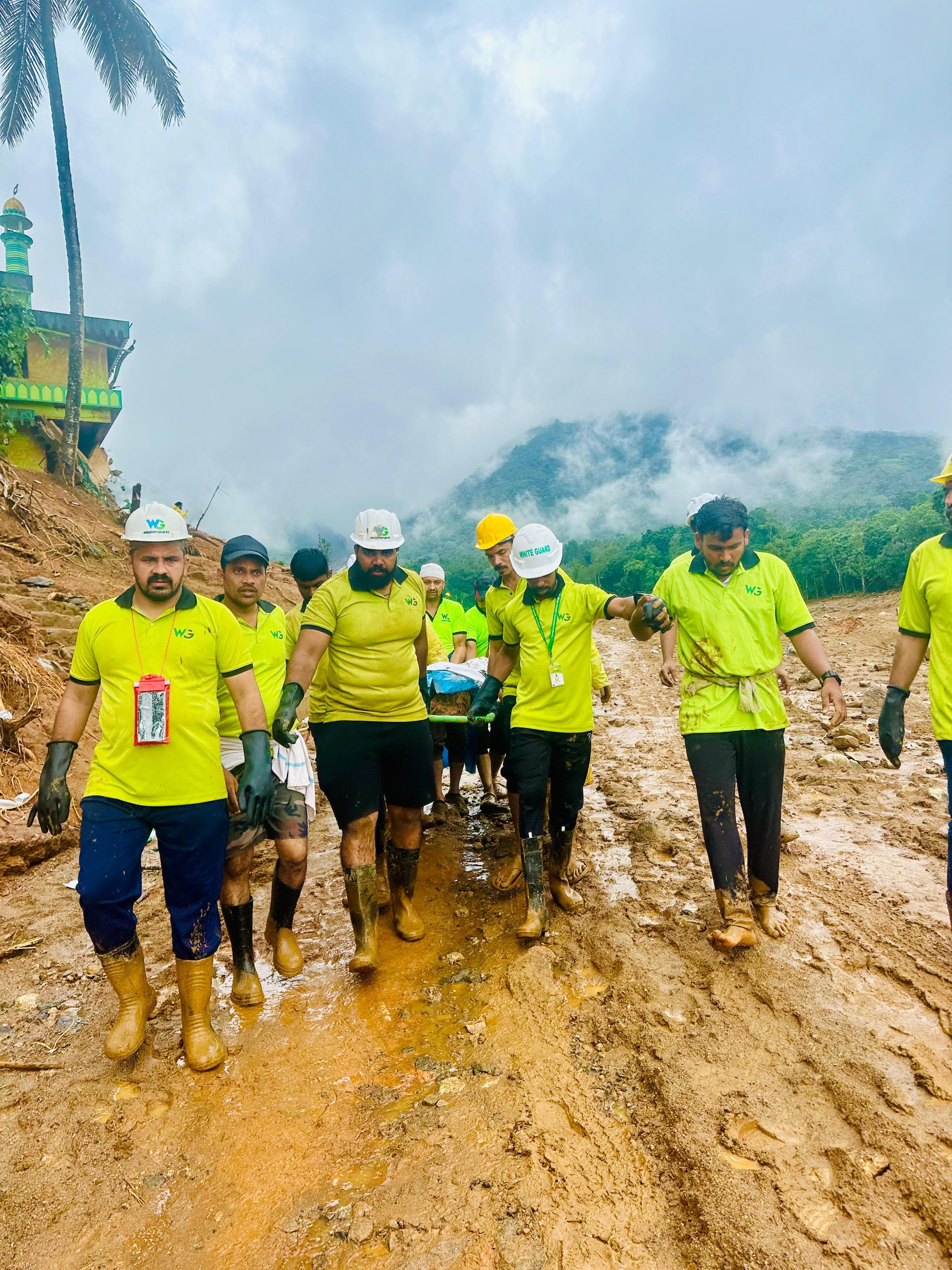
White Guard Volunteers rescue operation in the Wayanad landslide at Chooralmala

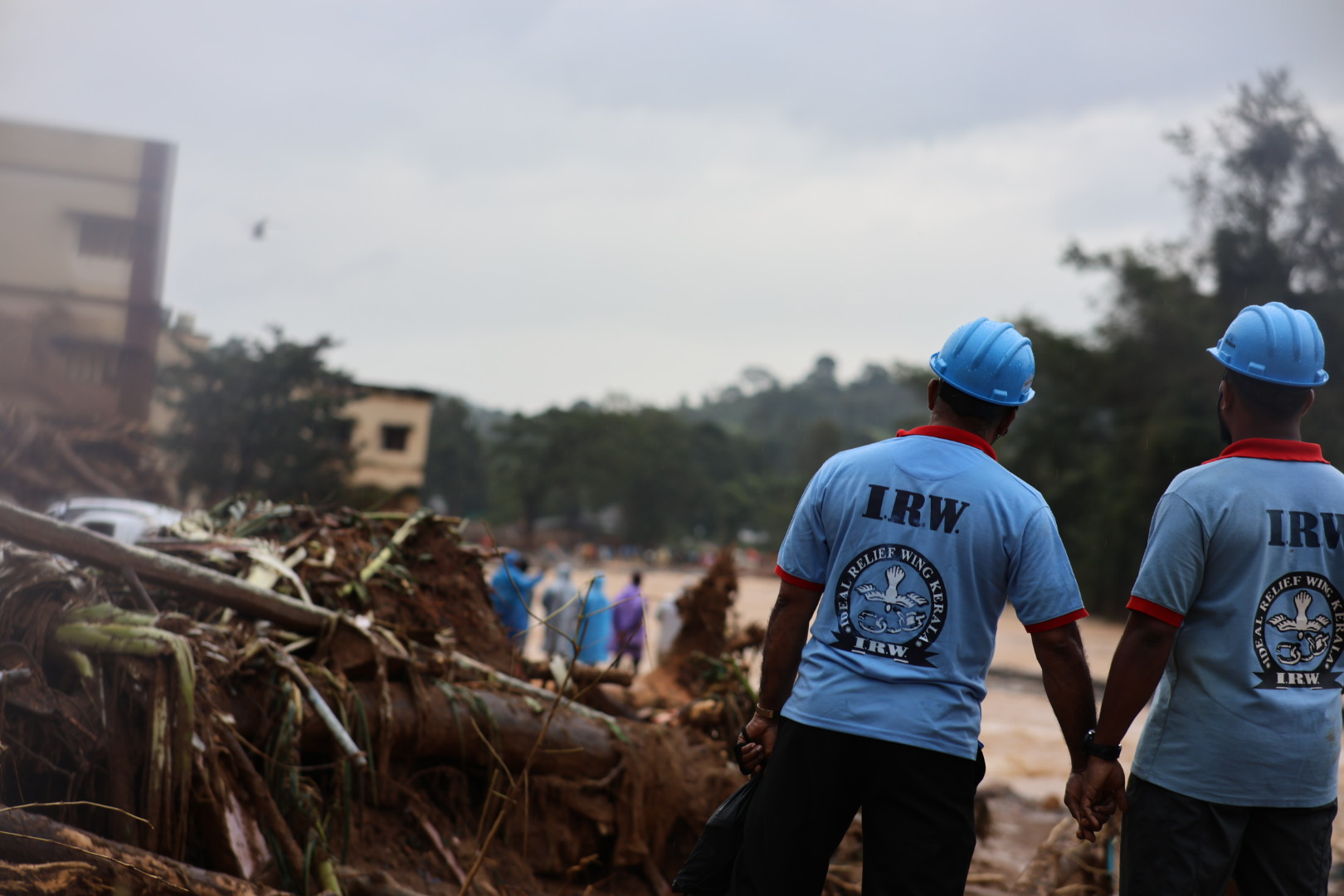
Rescue teams at Mundakkai and Chooralmala

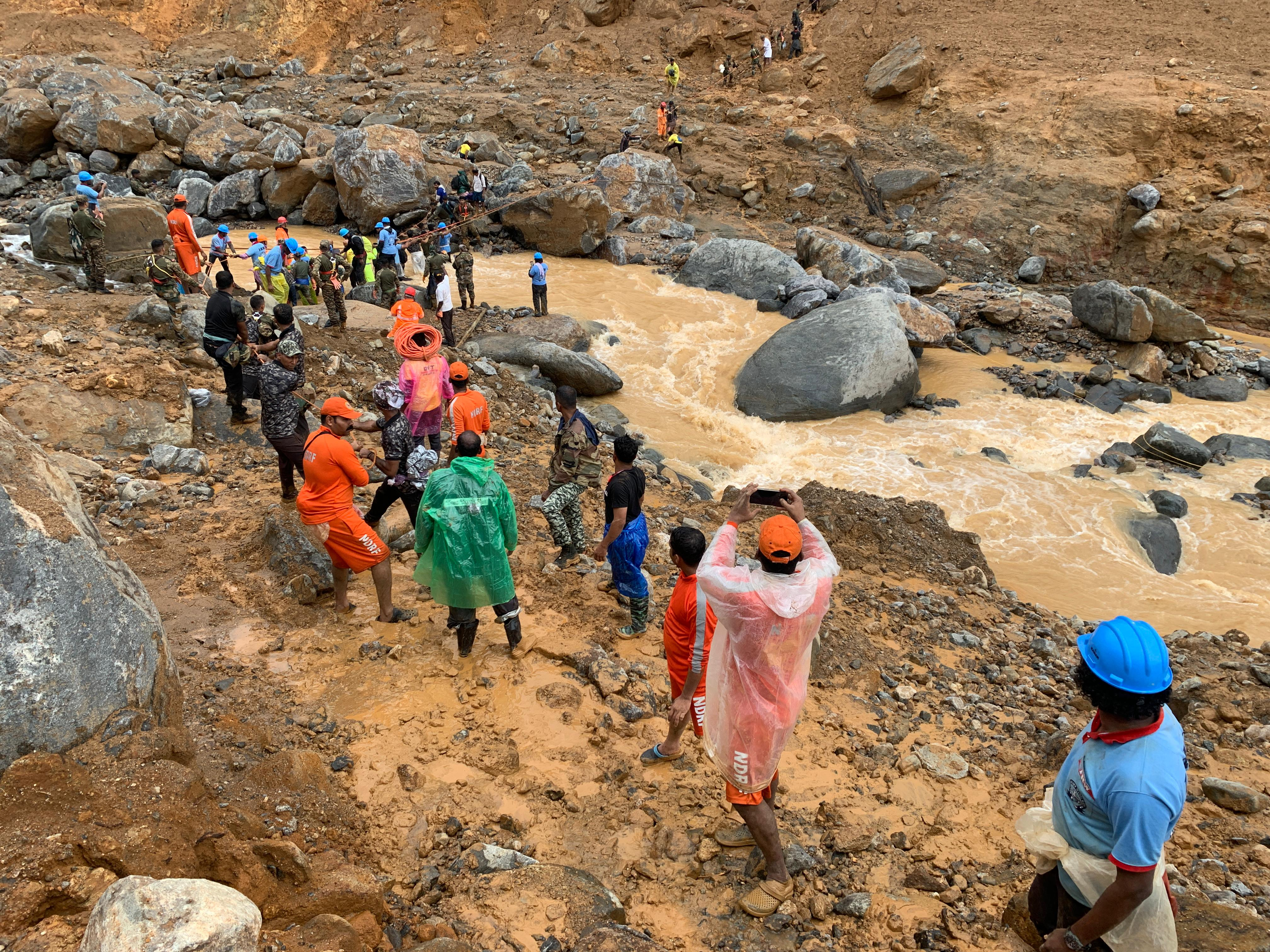
Rescue workers at the landslide-affected area

Wayanad is at risk of landslides during monsoon seasons. Located in the Western Ghats mountain range, its hills consist of faulted and eroded mountain edges of the Deccan Plateau. Geological evidence suggests that this region was shaped during the breakup of the supercontinent Gondwana. As a result of this breakup, the Deccan Plateau was formed from basalt rocks, leading to the rise of the Western Ghats. Geophysical data indicates that the mountainous area of Wayanad emerged along the west coast of India during the late Jurassic to early Cretaceous periods when India separated from the African continent. The Iruvanjippuzha and Chaliyar rivers, both originating in the Western Ghats, flow westward towards the Arabian Sea due to the steep gradient from east to west. Numerous smaller streams drain the region into these rivers, often carrying a substantial volume of water during the monsoon months. According to Meppadi government disaster mitigation documents prepared in 2020, the villages of Mundakkai, Chooralmala, Puthumala, Attamala, Vellithodu, Thrikkaippatta, and Kottatharavayal are highly sensitive to landslides and flash floods.

The villages of Punjirimattom, Mundakkai, Chooralmala, and Vellarimala are located on hilly terrain and farmland used for tea and coffee plantations, such as Harrisons Malayalam Limited. They border the Nilambur forests and the Chaliyar river. Residents of these villages are primarily agricultural workers who have lived in the area for generations. Most of the residents are plantation workers and raise animals.

== Incident ==
The Western Ghats in Kerala experienced heavy rains, accumulating 204.5 mm (8.05 in) of rainfall during the first 24 hours and 372.6 mm (14.67 in) in the following 24 hours before the event. Due to the heavy rainfall, residents of Punjirimattom, Attamala, and Mundakkai were relocated to relief camps by local authorities starting on 29 July 2024. Despite an alert issued by the district administration, many residents in the Chooralmala area chose to remain in their homes, as the area was not classified as landslide-prone. Around 02:17 IST (20:47 UTC), a landslide struck near the origin of the Punnappuzha river (one of the tributaries of Chaliyar), between the villages of Punjirimattom and Mundakkai, sweeping away both villages. This was followed by a second landslide at approximately 04:10 IST (22:40 UTC) in nearby Chooralmala, which diverted the Iruvanjippuzha river, causing flash floods that washed away the entire Chooralmala village. The collapse of the only bridge connecting the settlements left approximately 400 families stranded in Mundakkai and Attamala.

According to the First Information Report (FIR) on the Wayanad landslides prepared by the Geological Survey of India, the velocity of the debris flow was 57 m/s (190 ft/s). The debris flow originated as a debris slide at an elevation of 1,544 metres (5,066 ft), then followed the river's path, carrying tons of rock and soil mixed with water, forming a slurry that devastated everything in its path. The National Remote Sensing Centre (NRSC), a subsidiary of the Indian Space Research Organisation, analyzed satellite imagery and released their findings on 1 August 2024. The images revealed that approximately 86,000 m^{2} (930,000 sq ft) of land had moved down the hill.

== Aftermath ==
=== Loss of human lives ===
Over 420 people were killed and 397 people were injured, making these landslides the deadliest in Kerala's history. Seventeen entire families died. Most of the victims were tea and cardamom estate workers, asleep when the landslides struck. More than 118 people remain unaccounted for. Among the survivors, at least five children lost both parents, while six others lost one parent in the disaster. The landslides led to the mixing of muddy water and debris with the Chaliyar river, in which over 200 bodies or body parts were found.

=== Property and commercial loss ===
More than 1,555 houses and other buildings including schools, a dispensary, the panchayat bhawan, the electricity board office, and 136 community buildings were damaged. Additionally, 290 shops, 124 km (77 mi) of electricity infrastructure, two transformers, 1.5 km (0.93 mi) of rural roads, and three bridges were affected. The landslides also devastated a total of 600 ha (1,500 acres) of land, including 310 ha (770 acres) of farmland. After the landslides, business institutions including hundreds of shops in Chooralmala and Mundakkai were shut down by officials, citing danger of additional landslides. According to Kerala Vyapari Vyavasayi Ekopana Samithi, these restrictions cost more than ₹25 crore (US$2.6 million) to the business community in the impacted areas. Harrisons Malayalam lost 10 ha (25 acres) of tea estate, which cultivates an estimated 230 tonnes of tea produce worth ₹3.5 crore (US$360,000); forty-one estate employees and forty-eight of their family members were either missing or dead.

=== Loss of wildlife and livestock ===
The Wayanad Animal Husbandry Department reported that nearly 150 cattle and 75 goats perished in the disaster. Wildlife activists noted a relatively low number of wild animal deaths, despite large swathes of forests being flattened by the landslides, because of their heightened alertness to natural disasters. Among the deceased wild animals were two tigers, a sambar deer and its calf, and eight wild elephants, including four from the Periyar Tiger Reserve and two each from the Wayanad Wildlife Sanctuary and the Malayattoor forests. The Animal Husbandry Department also reported that 14 out of the 40 dairy farmers in the Chooralmala Dairy Cooperative Society were believed to be among the disaster victims, causing a drop of 12,420 litres (2,730 imp gal; 3,280 US gal) in milk production in Wayanad, and resulting in a shortage of milk supplies across Kerala. Additionally, large amounts of fodder grass used to feed domesticated livestock was destroyed.

== Rescue operations ==
=== Extrication efforts ===
==== First week ====
Rescue work after at Munakkai

Due to continuous heavy rains and the risk of further landslides, search operations could not begin until later in the day on 30 July, when numerous rescuers from various groups were deployed. The Indian Army established a command-and-control center in Kozhikode district to coordinate humanitarian assistance and disaster relief operations on 31 July. Over 4,000 people were rescued and more than 10,000 were relocated to 93 disaster relief camps in Wayanad. As a precaution, schools and colleges were closed in 10 out of 14 districts in Kerala. On 1 August, 144 army personnel from the Madras Engineer Group's Engineer Task Force constructed a temporary 190-foot-long (58 m) Bailey bridge within 31 hours. This bridge connected the Chooralmala village with Mundakkai over the Iruvanjippuzha River. The Kerala government also established 45 relief camps in Wayanad, providing shelter to over 4,000 people, while the state health department set up a control room to offer emergency assistance. Kerala's health minister, Veena George, stated that at least 1,500 rescue personnel, including forensic surgeons, were deployed.

On 2 August, the Indian Air Force deployed Lockheed C-130 Hercules aircraft, drones, and a specialized team of subsoil evacuation and rescue monitoring experts from Hindon Air Force Station in Ghaziabad. Rescue teams were divided across six zones (Attamala, Aaranmala, Mundakkai, Punjirimattom, Vellarmala village road, GVHSS Vellarmala), as well as areas downstream of the Chaliyar river. All police stations along the Chaliyar river were involved in the rescue efforts, assisted by regional expert swimmers. During the rescue operation in Mundakkai village, advanced radar detected signs of breathing beneath the soil; by evening, it was determined that these were more likely from animals rather than trapped humans. On 3 August, rescue operations resumed using advanced radar equipment and dog squads to locate buried victims. Authorities later reported that 341 autopsies had been completed, with 148 bodies identified. An aerial survey of the affected areas was conducted by Air Marshal Balakrishnan Manikantan and Army Station Commander M. P. Salil in order to assess the damage and carry out rescue operations.

==== Second week ====
There were increased rescue measures in the disaster-struck areas of Wayanad on 4 August. Advanced radar, drones, and heavy machinery, including earth movers and cranes were used to find survivors or buried remains. Odisha Police K9 unit Storm, known for his sniffing abilities in harsh conditions and proven past record, was also involved in the rescue operation. The rescue operations were aided by numerous experienced volunteers. Most of the rescue efforts were diverted to the Cheliyar River, which flows through Malappuram, Kozhikode, and Wayanad, because of an increased possibility of remains to be found in the river. Eight unclaimed bodies were buried in Puthumala. The search for missing people entered its seventh day on 5 August, with the resumption of search operations at the Chaliyar River. DNA samples from unidentified bodies were collected, to be later matched with family members. Traffic restrictions were put in place on the temporary bridge connecting Chooralmala and Mundakkai, allowing only rescuers to cross. In Puthumala, 31 unclaimed bodies and over 158 body parts were buried after interfaith prayers, each grave was marked with a DNA sample number. A large number of ambulances and more cadaver dogs were deployed in the search and rescue operations. Buried Object Detection Systems were used to find deeply-buried bodies. A special drive was initiated in the remote areas between Soochipara Falls and Pothukallu with the help of twelve army rescuers, dog squads, and forest department officials to find victims in Meppadi on 6 August. Teams were formed, each including one panchayath ward member of the Grama Panchayath, to assess the structural integrity of residential buildings. The Kerala government initiated a search operation in the Arabian Sea and sought the aid of the Navy and Coast Guard. The local authorities reported that 53 children had either died or were missing in the landslides. Rescue operations started in the Sunrise Valley area on 7 August. Kerala police registered 62 cases of spreading misinformation about misuse of the Chief Minister's Distress Relief Fund and arrested 15.

Rescue operations being conducted at the affected area

Search operations continued on 8 August. Search teams were delivered to inaccessible areas along the Chaliyar river with Air Force helicopters, and the use of heavy machines and K9 dog squads in Chooralmala and Mundakkai continued. The Indian Army withdrew partially from search operations and handed over further activities to the NDRF, State Disaster Response Force (SDRF), firefighters, and the Kerala police. A small contingent remained in the area to maintain the temporary bridge and to assist with search operations. Chief Minister Pinarayi Vijayan requested that volunteers avoid sending provisions, clothes, vegetables or confectionery to the disaster zone, instead to provide financial contributions for rehabilitation as nearly 400 truckloads of relief materials was in surplus. The State government began to allow survivors and next-of-kin of the missing or dead to take part in the final search operation between 06:00 and 11:00 IST on 9 August, along with disaster management authorities and medical teams. The Indian Army's K-9 Dog Squad also ended their search and rescue operations and exited Wayanad's landslide zone. A holiday was declared for all schools and colleges in the affected area after a booming sound caused anxiety among the locals. The state government initiated massive waste management efforts, and cleared over 150 tonnes of waste. Three dead bodies and one body part was found and then airlifted from near Kanthanpara Waterfalls. More than 700 documents such as revenue certificates, land ownership certificates, ration cards, and house ownership documents were distributed to affected families.

==== Third week ====
A last-ditch search and rescue effort started on 11 August, after a pause for a visit by the Prime Minister, to search for missing people. Hundreds of civil volunteers aided search operations and assisted fire and rescue personnel. Two more body parts were recovered from Kanthanpara Waterfalls. Revenue Minister K. Rajan confirmed that the landslides had cost around ₹1,200 crore (US$120 million) to the state of Kerala. According to the Ministry of Home Affairs, 322 out of 378 injured had been discharged from hospitals. The government of Kerala established a helpdesk at Chennai. Special search teams from the Army and Kerala Police's Special Operations Group intensified searches on 12 August in five regions close to the Chaliyar River in Malappuram; no volunteers were allowed Two more body parts, including a human skull, were recovered from Munderi Iruttukuthi and Chaliyar Kottupara Kadavu. Two-hundred-fifty-three rental houses, including government quarters, were identified in and around the affected villages, to act as temporary housing for those displaced by the landslides. A team of experts from the Kerala State Disaster Management Authority was formed to study future habitation in the landslide-hit regions.

An expert panel chaired by senior scientist John Matthai of the National Centre for Geosciences was appointed by the State Disaster Management Authority to inspect the landslide-hit areas on 13 August, to assess how the disaster happened and what occurred during the landslide. They later recommended five locations for the construction of new townships. Three more body parts were recovered from Wayanad's Vellarmala and Thalappali areas and Malappuram's Kumpalappara. Search operations continued for a few hours in the Mundakai-Chooralmala disaster areas on the banks of the river flowing through the forest below the Chooralmala bridge. The India Meteorological Department issued severe weather alerts on 15 August and warned against the possibility of another flash flood.

==== Fourth week ====
Due to a lack of quality DNA samples from bodies, forensic scientists began to use next-generation DNA sequencing technology to try and match 52 decomposed samples against DNA profiles built from 401 samples at the Kerala Genome Data Center (KGDC)'s forensic lab in Kannur. On 19 August, the Wayanad district administration imposed a ban on visitor entry from neighboring districts and the states of Tamil Nadu and Karnataka to the landslide-affected villages of Mundakkai and Chooralmala. By 26 August, all affected families were relocated from relief camps to relief housing. On 21 August, the government of Kerala asked for central assistance of ₹900 crore (US$93 million).

=== Rescuer mobilization ===
A total of 1,531 rescuers were mobilized from different forces, including 35 personnel from the NDRF, 582 from the Indian Army, the Madras Engineer Group (MEG), the Defence Security Corps (DSC), 23 personnel from the Indian Air Force, 120 personnel from the SDRF, 460 personnel from the Kerala Fire and Rescue Services, 31 Forest department personnel, 61 personnel from the Tamil Nadu Disaster Response Force, seven from the Tamil Nadu Medical team, 50 from the Indian Coast Guard, 80 from the Indian Navy, and 82 personnel from the Kerala Civil Defense.

=== Resource allocation ===
Four helicopters, as well as a C-130 cargo plane and numerous drone aircraft were deployed by Indian Air Force for rescue operation. Fourteen Army columns, along with five medical teams, the Madras Engineer Group, two teams from the Defence Security Corps, a parachute regiment team, and 15 dogs from a K-9 dog squad were mobilized by the Indian Army. Other specialized equipment such as radar and excavators were also deployed by the Army. The INS Zamorin was sent to the area to assist with rescue operations. An Indian Navy column from Kozhikode, a medical team, a river crossing team, and two sets of UAV-based sub-soil scanners were deployed for rescue and relief operation. The Indian Coast Guard provided three disaster response teams (two from Kochi and one from Beypore), along with ALH MK III aircraft stationed at Kochi, CGS Kochi, ICGS Beypore and CGS Vizhinjam. Other disaster response forces included four teams from the NDRF, the SDRF, the Forest Department, the Fire Service, and the Kerala police. The Wayanad district administration and Civil Defence mobilized 100 ambulances, doctors, medical supplies, and equipment.

=== Volunteers ===
The District Administration were effective in collaborating IAG group under the leadership its Executive Committee. There were several organisation worked under the leadership of IAG( Inter Agency Group) and District Emergency Operation Center (DEOC) become the center point of coordination and allocation of such needs. An effective system were in place to manage the volunteers by the IAG and Numerous volunteers from political parties, charity institutions, religious, social, and cultural organizations registered themselves with the district administration and became involved at the affected sites and relief camps. These included Seva Bharati, White Guard Volunteers, Mata Amritanandamayi Math, Indian Youth Congress, Sunni Students' Federation, Democratic Youth Federation of India, All India Youth Federation, People's Foundation and Ideal Relief Wing. Volunteers from the Bharat Scouts and Guides, the National Service Scheme (NSS), and the National Cadet Corps (NCC) also assisted. School teachers motivated their students to take part in to the NSS and NCC programmes. Students from various schools in Wayanad also distributed relief materials and food supplies to the landslide survivors, and provided physical assistance and emotional support.

== Causes ==
Landslide location and the debris flow route

=== Anthropological factors ===
Landslides can be caused by heavy rain fall, slope of the land, poor construction techniques, and poor-planned land use.

According to the latest census data provided by the Government of India, the population of Wayanad district increased 11-fold over the past century, from 75,149 in 1901 to 817,420 in 2011, within an area of 2,132 km^{2} (823 sq mi). With the increase in the population, tourism also boomed in the area in the recent decades as affluent travelers started visiting the plateau district for extended weekends. According to the state tourism department's data, tourist arrivals into the state grew 72% from 2003 (6.16 million) to 2023 ( 22.52 million). Out of the 19.21 millions tourists who visited Kerala in 2022, 1.51 million visited Wayanad district alone. To host such a large number of tourists, many resorts have been built.

=== Deforestation ===
The Cochin University of Science and Technology in Kochi conducted a study on soil topography and geomorphology of Wayanad and concluded that major deforestation occurred in Wayanad district as a result of the creation of tea plantations, which contributed to the landslides.

Another study published in 2022 by the International Journal of Environmental Research and Public Health on deforestation in Wayanad district showed that 62% of green cover in the district disappeared between 1950 and 2018, while tea plantation cover rose by around 1800%, leaving less forest to keep muddy hills stable. Kerala's hilly regions have slopes of more than 20 degrees, increasing the risk of flash floods during heavy rains.

=== Geological triggers ===
According to the Geological Survey of India, a total of 19,301 km^{2} (7,452 sq mi), or 49.7% of Kerala's total area, falls within landslide-prone areas. Chairman of The Western Ghats Ecology Expert Panel (WGEEP) and ecologist Madhav Gadgil categorised all three divisions of Wayanad (Vythiri, Sultan Bathery and Mananthavady) as Ecologically Sensitive Zone-I, and suggested stringent regulations, including a ban on future construction and mining. However, no such regulatory measures had been taken up.

=== Global warming ===
The World Weather Attribution (WWA) group, including 24 scientists from India, Sweden, the United States, and the United Kingdom, studied climate high-resolution models to accurately predict rainfall in the relatively small study area around Wayanad. The models indicated that the intensity of rainfall has increased 10% due to climatic change and a further increase of 4% can be expected if the average temperature rises by two degrees, causing Kerala to become thermodynamically and ecologically unstable. The study suggested that a warmer atmosphere could hold more moisture, leading to heavier downpours within short period of time, causing an increase in the potential number of landslides that could be triggered in the future around Kerala.

An expert panel chaired by senior geoscientist John Matthai of the National Centre for Earth Science Studies (NCESS) appointed by the State Disaster Management Authority (SDMA) visited the villages in the impacted area and reported that an uphill heavy rainfall–induced "Dam burst effect" caused the landslide that destroyed the three villages.

=== Hilling effect ===
Residents of Edakkal noticed a mysterious underground noise around 10:15 IST on 9 August, causing panic among locals anticipating another landslide. The India Meteorological Department initially suspected that an earthquake had occurred, but the National Centre for Seismology confirmed that none was recorded by any seismological stations. Seismologists later explained the incident as a "hilling effect", in which a weakened land mass shifts naturally to regain stability, creating a rumbling sound.

== Rehabilitation work ==
=== Relief efforts ===
VPS Healthcare, a multinational company based in Abu Dhabi, provided extraction support to the search and rescue teams and medical treatment to injured residents. Jio Infocomm increased network strength in the impacted area, and set up an additional tower to improve communication services. Airtel India increased caps on affected customers' voice and data services. The Business Club in Kozhikode offered to construct 40 houses worth ₹3 crore (US$310,000). Munnar Catering College pledged to develop an educational project worth ₹1 crore (US$100,000). Prathidhwani IT Employee's Welfare Organisation, Kottakkal Arya Vaidya Sala, and National Service Scheme each offered to construct 2 houses, 10 houses and 150 houses respectively. Ahalia Medical Group, a health organization in Kerala, pledged to adopt all orphaned children. K-FON provided high-speed internet connections to all the search and rescue teams in the impacted area. Sobha Group, a Dubai-based real estate company, offered help construct 50 houses worth ₹10 crore (US$1.0 million). Amrita Hospital provided advanced medical care to severely injured people. Gokulam Group and All India Malayalee Association pledged to construct 25 houses together. Reporter TV, an Indian Malayalam-language news channel offered to provide 150 acres (61 hectares) of land for a new township. The Kerala State Electricity Board pledged to supply free electricity to consumers in disaster-hit areas for six months, The board also exempted outstanding amounts in disaster-hit areas. Yenepoya University, Mangalore offered free education to students from affected families. ABC Cargo, a UAE-based cargo company, provided employment opportunities to about 100 people from affected families. The Kerala Catholic Bishops' Council offered help to construct 100 houses and provide expert medical care and trauma counseling. The Kerala Association of Professional Social Workers provided emergency psychological assistance, with a focus on children's mental health. Prodomino Foundation, a Chennai-based non-profit organization, offered to clean houses before residents could reenter.

Faircode Infotech, a Kochi-based software company, provided ERP software to manage supplies sent to relief camps. Kerala Suchitwa Mission provided supplies such as non-disposable eating utensils and other materials. Akshaya Patra Foundation pledged to provide 10,000 kits containing meals to sustain a family of three for up to a week. Fujifilm donated medical equipment to local authorities. Reliance Foundation provided supplies, counseling, and vocational training. National Institute of Physical Medicine and Rehabilitation), a Thrissur-based rehabilitation center, provided counselling services for the survivors. Harrisons Malayalam Limited pledged to transfer about 2,500 square metres (0.25 ha) of land to local authorities for burial in Vellarmala village. Noorul Islam Institute of Medical Science and Research Foundation offered free education to 1,000 affected students. Central Food Technological Research Institute, an Indian food research institute and laboratory based in Mysore, provided food. Kerala Nadvathul Mujahideen. Sree Gokulam Movies donated funds that were to be spent on a promotional event of the film Thangalaan. One individual provided 100 cots using his savings.

Residents of Coimbatore provided a truckload of essential supplies, including food, clothes, notebooks, and blankets worth ₹20 lakh (US$21,000). Kerala Bank wrote off loans availed from its Mundakkai and Chooralmala branch by the victims and survivors worth ₹29 crore (US$3.0 million). V. D. Satheesan, Leader of opposition in the Kerala assembly, pledged bear the life-long expenses of a young survivor who lost her entire family. Event Management Association of Kerala offered to build a new house for an affected family. Dr Moopen's Medical College pleadged to build multiple houses worth ₹1.5 crore (US$160,000) for affected families. The Kerala State Small Industries Association offered to build 10 houses on 1 acre (0.40 hectares) of land. NSS Students of Kannur University provided essential items worth ₹10 lakh (US$10,000) to the affected people. Street Providence, a food bank for the poor from Sangolda, Goa, provided bedding and other supplies. The International Society for Krishna Consciousness pledged to provide food and rubber boots in landslide-hit areas.

The Kerala State Financial Enterprises Limited (KSFE Ltd) a public sector company under Government of Keralam donated Rs 5 Cr to the CMDRF Keralam to help the victims & rebuilding process.

=== Animal welfare ===
Numerous pets and livestock were found stranded in the rubble caused by the landslides. A team of veterinarians from the Animal Husbandry Department, animal rescue organisations, and members of the Indian Veterinary Association searched for these animals around affected areas in Wayanad district. Many pets were found sniffing around the area of their former homes or sitting on the rubble and were found to be reluctant to eat or drink and were showing symptoms of shock. Temporary shelters and medical support were provided to 90 cattle, 22 dogs, 7 cats, and more than 50 fowls by the Humane Society International and in some cases, surviving villagers adopted them.

=== Orphan adoption ===
The landslides left five children without any living family members, while six others lost one of their parents. After many families expressed willingness to adopt these orphan children, the Central Adoption Resource Authority invoked the Juvenile Justice Act to oversee the adoption and child fostering process and assign the children to appropriate families. A mother of two children from Idukki volunteered to breastfeed infants who have lost their mother until they get adopted.

== Humanitarian aid ==
=== State governments ===
The government of Tamil Nadu offered ₹5 crore (US$520,000) for relief operations and sent medical and rescue teams. The chief minister of Karnataka, Siddaramiah, assured the Kerala government that the state would build 100 houses for those affected by the landslides. The government of Andhra Pradesh announced a lump sum donation of ₹10 crore (US$1.0 million) for the affected families of Wayanad. On 26 August, the government of Uttar Pradesh sanctioned ₹10 crore (US$1.0 million) to relief efforts in Kerala, as communicated in an official letter by Chief Minister Yogi Adityanath.

The state government of Kerala announced on 12 August assistance of ₹10,000 (US$100) per month per family to those who lost everything to the landslides in the Mundakai and Churalmala areas of Wayanad district. On 13 August the government announced that families would get ₹6,000 (US$62) per month as rent allowance until repairs to their homes are completed. The government also announced payments of ₹6 lakh (US$6,200) to families of the deceased, ₹75,000 (US$780) to those with major injuries, and ₹5,000 (US$52) to those with minor injuries. On 17 August, the government released ₹10,000 (US$100) each to 617 persons who had lost their means of livelihood, and sanctioned the disbursement of ₹10,000 (US$100) each to 124 persons for cremation and burial.

As of 9 June 2025, Total disaster relief fund collected was at ₹763.16 crore (US$79 million), out of which only 4.80% ₹36.81 crore (US$3.8 million) was allotted for relief work.

=== Corporate and NGOs ===
Donors	Amount	References
Lulu Group International	₹5 crore (US$520,000)	
RP Group	₹5 crore (US$520,000)	
Kalyan Jewellers	₹5 crore (US$520,000)	
Malabar Group	₹5 crore (US$520,000)	
Aster DM Healthcare	₹5 crore (US$520,000)	
Adani Group	₹5 crore (US$520,000)	
Malankara Orthodox Syrian Church	₹5 crore (US$520,000)	
Thiruvananthapuram Corporation	₹2 crore (US$210,000)	
Pothys Retail Ltd	₹50 lakh (US$52,000)	
Bhima Jewellery Group	₹2 crore (US$210,000)	
Cochin Shipyard Limited	₹1 crore (US$100,000)	
SNDP Yogam	₹25 lakh (US$26,000)	
Kerala Social Centre	₹10 lakh (US$10,000)	
Varkey Group	₹1.1 crore (US$110,000)	
Kerala Institute of Medical Sciences	₹1 crore (US$100,000)	
ViswaSanthi Foundation	₹3 crore (US$310,000)	
Kerala Minerals and Metals Limited	₹50 lakh (US$52,000)	
Kerala State Women's Development Corporation	₹30 lakh (US$31,000)	
Canara Bank	₹5 crore (US$520,000)	
Kerala State Financial Enterprises	₹5 crore (US$520,000)	
Seashore Group	₹50 lakh (US$52,000)	
Al Muqtadir Group	₹10 lakh (US$10,000)	
Palluruthy Service Co-operative Bank	₹10 lakh (US$10,000)	
Thrikkakara Municipal Co-operative Hospital	₹10 lakh (US$10,000)	
Cable TV Operators Association	₹10 lakh (US$10,000)	
Deshabhimani Employees	₹50 lakh (US$52,000)	
Nishka Jewellery	₹50 lakh (US$52,000)	
Meenakshi Mission Hospital	₹10 lakh (US$10,000)	
Vellore Institute of Technology	₹1 crore (US$100,000)	
SRM Institute of Science and Technology	₹1 crore (US$100,000)	
Royale Hayat Hospital Employees	₹7 lakh (US$7,300)	
Noorul Islam Institute of Medical Science and Research Foundation	₹1 crore (US$100,000)	
Kerala Karshaka Sangham	₹1 crore (US$100,000)	
All India Kisan Sabha	₹5 lakh (US$5,200)	
Tamil Nadu Vivasayigal Sangham	₹1 lakh (US$1,000)	
Alappuzha district panchayat	₹2.5 crore (US$260,000)	
Kuwait Aluva Pravasi Association	₹1.11 lakh (US$1,200)	
Kerala Bank	₹50 lakh (US$52,000)	
Sahara	₹2 crore (US$210,000)	
Ayurveda Medical Association of India	₹10 lakh (US$10,000)	
Dr Moopen's Medical College	₹2.5 crore (US$260,000)	
Manipuri Students of Kannur University	₹1 lakh (US$1,000)	
Kerala State Cashew Development Corporation	₹11 lakh (US$11,000)	
Kerala Cricket Association	₹1 crore (US$100,000)	
Technopark Trivandrum InfoPark Kochi Cyberpark, Kozhikode	₹2.1 crore (US$220,000)	

=== Individual ===
Donors	Amount	References
Suriya Karthi Jyothika	₹50 lakh (US$52,000)	
Vikram	₹20 lakh (US$21,000)	
Mammootty	₹20 lakh (US$21,000)	
Dulquer Salmaan	₹15 lakh (US$16,000)	
Fahadh Fasil Nazriya Nazim	₹25 lakh (US$26,000)	
Rashmika Mandanna	₹10 lakh (US$10,000)	
Nayanthara Vignesh Shivan	₹20 lakh (US$21,000)	
Anand Patwardhan	₹2.2 lakh (US$2,300)	
Allu Arjun	₹25 lakh (US$26,000)	
Chiranjeevi Ram Charan	₹1 crore (US$100,000)	
Jayaram	₹5 lakh (US$5,200)	
Pinarayi Vijayan T. Kamala	₹1.33 lakh (US$1,400)	
Dalai Lama	₹11 lakh (US$11,000)	
Tovino Thomas	₹25 lakh (US$26,000)	
Navya Nair	₹1 lakh (US$1,000)	
Kamal Haasan	₹25 lakh (US$26,000)	
Shobhana George	₹10 lakh (US$10,000)	
Joju George	₹5 lakh (US$5,200)	
Rimi Tomy	₹5 lakh (US$5,200)	
T Padmanabhan	₹5 lakh (US$5,200)	
K Radhakrishnan	₹1 lakh (US$1,000)	
John Brittas	₹1 lakh (US$1,000)	
V. Sivadasan	₹1 lakh (US$1,000)	
A. A. Rahim	₹1 lakh (US$1,000)	
Bikash Ranjan Bhattacharya	₹1 lakh (US$1,000)	
Amraram	₹1 lakh (US$1,000)	
S. Venkatesan	₹1 lakh (US$1,000)	
Ramesh Chennithala	₹50,000 (US$520)	
S P Velumani	₹1 crore (US$100,000)	
Prabhas	₹2 crore (US$210,000)	
A. K. Antony	₹50,000 (US$520)	
Sukesh Chandrashekhar	₹15 crore (US$1.6 million)	(Note: Proposed by him, but not confirmed by Government.)
Arif Mohammed Khan	₹5 lakh (US$5,200)	
V. D. Satheesan	₹1 lakh (US$1,000)	
Lissy Lakshmi	₹1 crore (US$100,000)	
Dhanush K.Raja	₹25 lakh (US$26,000)	
Prithviraj Sukumaran	₹25 lakh (US$26,000)	
Dinesh Nirmal	₹25 lakh (US$26,000)	
K. T. Jaleel	₹5 lakh (US$5,200)	
P. S. Sreedharan Pillai	₹8 lakh (US$8,300)	

== Reactions ==
=== Domestic ===
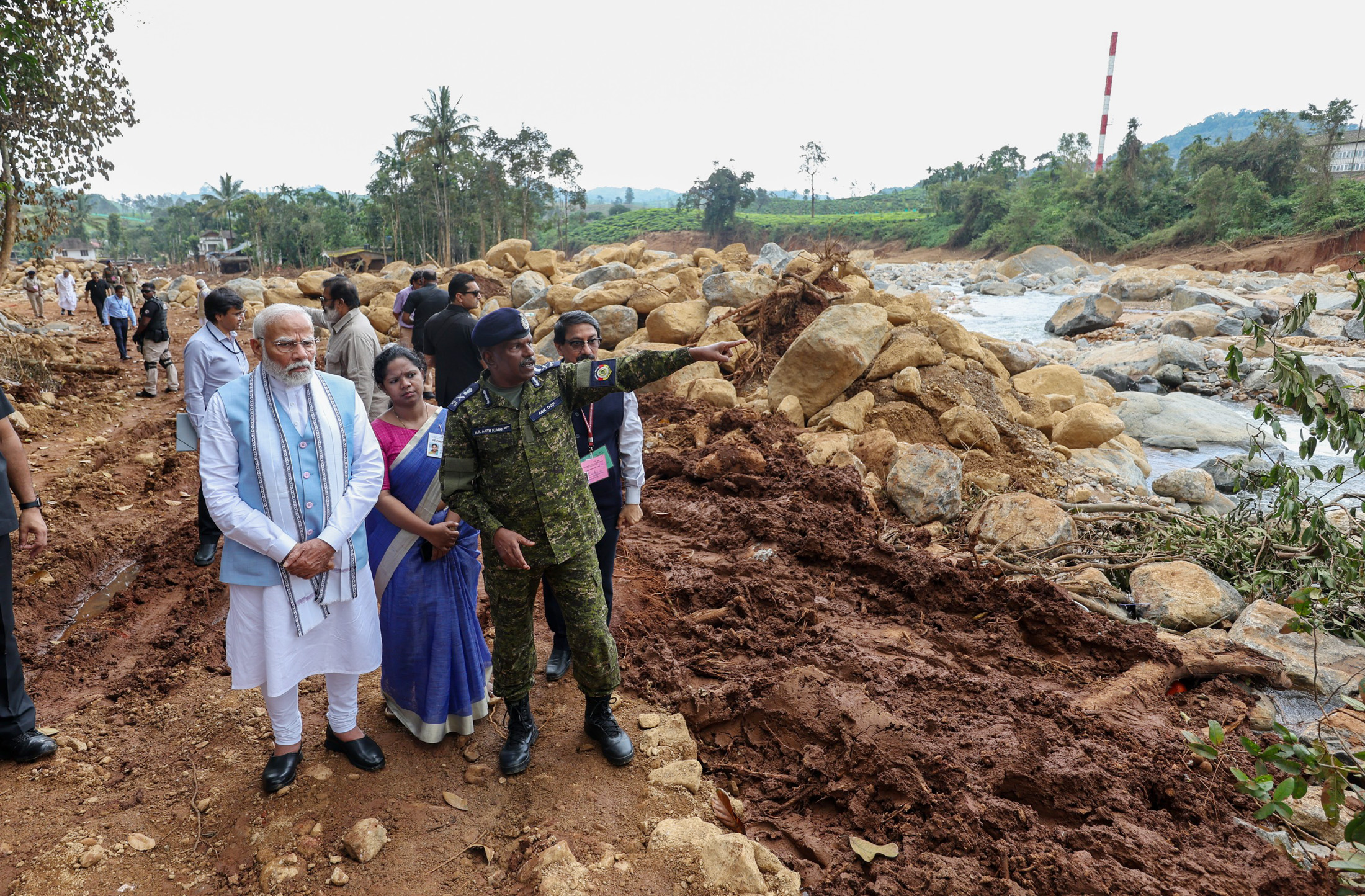
Indian Prime Minister Narendra Modi at the landslide-affected region

Prime Minister Narendra Modi announced payments of ₹2 lakh (US$2,100) to relatives of the dead and ₹50,000 (US$520) to each injured. He later visited Wayanad district on 10 August, accompanied by Kerala chief minister Pinarayi Vijayan, governor Arif Mohammed Khan and minister of state Suresh Gopi to conduct aerial surveys of the region. He also visited a relief camp to meet the landslide-affected people.

Rahul Gandhi, leader of the opposition in the Lok Sabha and former member of Parliament for Wayanad Lok Sabha constituency, spoke with chief minister of Kerala Pinarayi Vijayan and urged United Democratic Front workers to provide help. Gandhi and his sister Priyanka Gandhi were initially scheduled to visit Wayanad on 31 July, but the visit was postponed to the next day due to heavy rains and inclement weather. The duo visited the relief camps in Wayanad on 1 August. He said during a press conference in Wayanad later that day that the Indian National Congress would build 100 houses in the affected areas. Indian Union Muslim League President Sayyid Sadiq Ali Shihab Thangal said that in addition to the 100 homes, work, medicine and education would be essential for the survival of poor people and a comprehensive rehabilitation package would be implemented.

Archbishop Andrews Thazhath, president of the Catholic Bishops' Conference of India, expressed condolences to the families affected by the Wayanad landslides, saying all Catholic parishes and institutions nearby would be actively engaging in the rescue mission and support government agencies in their relief efforts. He said Caritas India is already on the ground, coordinating with its local partners such as Wayanad Social Service Society, Shreyas, and Jeevana to deliver immediate relief support and trauma counseling to those affected by the crisis.

The Union Home Minister of India Amit Shah informed the Parliament of India that four early warnings were issued to the Kerala government between 23 and 26 July indicating possible rainfall of more than 20 cm (200 mm) in and around the area. The Chief Minister of Kerala responded by claiming that the red alert was issued for Wayanad only after the disaster and only a forecast of low probability for landslides was given for Wayanad on 30 and 31 July by the central agencies. The Kerala state government distributed mobile phones, free rations, and duplicate certificates to affected individuals in need of them.

In the wake of the landslides, the tourism department of the state government called off the Nehru Trophy, Champion's Boat League, and all types of the Onam week celebrations in the whole state, scheduled to begin on 10 August. The government also cancelled Pulikali, Kummattikali in Thrissur during Onam. The Pulikali organizing committee and participating teams unilaterally expressed their opposition to the cancellation because of the debt they had taken on for the event. On 19 August the state recinded the cancellation.

=== International ===
United States president Joe Biden, Chinese premier Li Qiang, and Russian president Vladimir Putin extended their condolences and sympathies to the people of India, as did Maldives president Mohamed Muizzu, the Turkish Ministry of Foreign Affairs, Australian high commissioner to India Philip Green, Israeli ambassador to India Naor Gilon, French envoy to India Thierry Mathou, Iranian ambassador in India Denis Alipov, Armenian foreign minister Ararat Mirzoyan, president of UAE Sheikh Mohamed bin Zayed Al Nahyan, King Salman and Crown Prince Mohammed bin Salman of Saudi Arabia, Bhutanese prime minister Tshering Tobgay, and the foreign ministries of Latvia, Jordan, Bahrain, Kuwait, Egypt, the Netherlands, and Germany. Pope Francis prayed for victims of the landslides during his angelus address at Saint Peter's Square.

== Controversies ==
=== CMDRF transparency ===
The Chief Minister's Distress Relief Fund (CMDRF) faced criticism on social media, with some accusing it of lacking transparency and misusing funds. The chief minister of Kerala Pinarayi Vijayan denied these claims, emphasising that the Comptroller and Auditor General audited the CMDRF from 2016 to 2019 and found no irregularities. He further stated that the CMDRF was completely open to scrutiny by the Kerala Legislative Assembly and operated entirely on a transparent electronic platform that tracked all incoming and outgoing funds. He further stated that all transactions of CMDRF could be accessed by the general public through the right to information act. Both the ruling Left Democratic Front and opposition United Democratic Front expressed full support for the CMDRF, with all MLAs from both sides contributing to the fund. In response to the allegations against the CMDRF, FIRs were lodged against 14 individuals, including the owner of online news portal Marunadan Malayali, Shajan Skaria and film director Akhil Marar.

As of 9 June 2025, the total disaster relief fund collected was at ₹763.16 crore (US$79 million), out of which only 4.80% that was ₹36.81 crore (US$3.8 million), was allotted for relief work by the Government of Kerala.

=== Government advisory to scientific community ===
The Kerala state government issued an order to scientific and technology institutions prohibiting scientists from conducting any site visits or further studies without prior permission from the Kerala Disaster Management Authority. The advisory also directed the scientific community to restrain from speaking to the media about the landslides or their potential causes. Although the government stated the advisory was made in an effort to curtail panic and misinterpretations of scientific statements by the general public, it was ultimately seen as a gag order that suppressed scientific dialogue, and was revoked hours later.

=== Suo moto case & writ petition ===
After concerns over reoccurring landslides in the state of Kerala, Justices A. K. Jayasankaran Nambiar and V. M. Syam Kumar of Kerala High Court asked the court's registrar general to register a suo moto case to consider steps that can be put in place to prevent and manage natural disasters that may arise in the state in the future. The high court wanted to look for the legal framework to control illegal mining and floodings. Meanwhile, Kasaragod resident advocate C Shukur submitted another writ petition and demanded the high court stop the collection of money without prior permission from the government and to stop misuse or mismanagement of funds during disasters that could occur due to lack of transparency, poor oversight, corruption, and insufficient oversight mechanisms. Later, the Kerala High Court dismissed the writ petition alleging relief funds being collected on political or religious grounds. The court also imposed costs of ₹25,000 (US$260) to be paid to the Chief Minister's Disaster Relief Fund on the petitioner.

=== Charity food distributions ===
A controversy arose when police closed the White Guard kitchen on 4 August, which provided free food to 7,000 people a day at the Wayanad landslides. The closing was carried out in disaster-hit areas near Mepadi by Kannur deputy inspector general Thomson Jose on the orders of the minister. The controversial closings were withdrawn on 5 August.

=== Arrest of YouTuber Aju Alex ===
After the landslide at Wayanad, Malayalam actor Mohanlal, who is also an honorary lieutenant colonel in the Indian Territorial Army visited the site in army uniform. YouTuber Aju Alex spotted his uniform and made a defamatory remark against Mohanlal, which generated social media backlash. A case was registered by the Tiruvalla police. Alex went into hiding after the case was filed and was later caught arrested. He was later released after being granted bail, and according to police may face a civil suit.

=== Unauthorized properties ===
Wayanad is a small district where majority of the population directly or indirectly depending tourism sector as the farming is not being feasible for the larger group. https://timesofindia.indiatimes.com/city/kochi/wayanad-tragedy-over-380-buildings-come-up-every-year-in-landslide-hit-kerala-panchayat-meppadi/articleshow/112233229.cms We cannot consider the tourism sector alone as the cause of landslides. but Unregulated tourism was considered to be one of the reasons for changing the land-use pattern that aggravated the landslide conditions in Wayanad. Thousands of unauthorized homestays and resorts did not have any records in the official database of government, but they could be seen on search engines like Google Maps. Most of these unauthorized establishments lacked licenses from local bodies or the District Tourism Promotion Council. According to the Department of Tourism, only 32 such villas or resorts were registered with government, but more than 3,000 such establishments could be found online in the Wayanad district alone. These properties did not pay taxes, and did not follow any norms of the State Pollution Control Board or forest department. Authorities have started taking action against them. A report submitted by the district town planner to District Disaster Management Authority on 27 September indicated that several resorts located in the landslide-prone zones of the eastern slope of the Western Ghats violated all norms and regulations. The Fire and Rescue Department reported that several glass bridges in resorts operate without approvals from any department.

=== The pork challenge ===
The Democratic Youth Federation of India (DYFI), the youth wing of the CPIM, conducted two pork challenges. The first event was organized at Kasaragod on 10 August and raised ₹1.25 lakh (US$1,300). The second event was organized at Kothamangalam, Ernakulam district, on 18 August and raised ₹50,000 (US$520) by selling tones of meat as part of the drive to raise funds for Wayanad landslides victims. Later, Sunni Muslim cleric Nasar Faizy Koodathay called it "religious blasphemy, done under the guise of a challenge", as the majority of the victims are Sunni Muslim and consider pork a prohibited food.

=== Loan EMI vs relief aid ===
The government of Kerala released emergency financial assistance of ₹10,000 (US$100) to 617 persons on 17 August as relief aid. Some of these beneficiary had taken business, personal or agriculture loans from Kerala Gramin Bank before the landslides. Once the funds were credited in the accounts of the victim, the bank deducted their due EMI from the account on 18 August. Protests arose as these victims had nothing left after the landslides. The Human Rights Commission of India launched a voluntary police case against the bank, after which the bank refunded the money.

== See also ==
- List of landslides
- 2024 Jivitputrika tragedy
- 2020 Pettimudi landslide
- Disaster Management
