= Enathu Bailey bridge =

Bridge in India

Coordinates: 9.0884°N 76.7555°E

Enathu Bailey bridge was a Bailey bridge constructed by Indian Army through Kallada River in Enathu, Pathanamthitta, Kerala. It connects Enathu with Kottarakkara. The bridge is opened for public at 10 April 2017. In September 2017, after the Enathu Bridge maintenance completed, the Indian Army dismantle the Bailey bridge.

== Structure ==
The bridge measured 54.5 m in length and 3.5 m in width, sufficient for single‐lane motor traffic including light vehicles and emergency ambulances. As a standard Class 18 Bailey bridge, it comprised prefabricated steel truss panels that a 50‑soldier team from the Madras Engineer Group (Madras Sappers) assembled in just 36 hours using cranes and launching equipment brought in from Chennai. Opened to the public on 10 April 2017 by the then Revenue Minister K. Rajan, it operated under the supervision of the Kerala Public Works Department (PWD) until the permanent bridge reopened on 31 August 2017. The bridge is 54.50-metre-long with a width of 3.5 metres. After the RCC Enathu Bridge reopened on 31 August 2017 following completion of repair works, the Bailey bridge was formally dismantled beginning on 15 September 2017 by a contingent of 14 Army engineers led by Lt. Col. P. Damodaran and Major Vineeth. The operation concluded in three to four days, and all military equipment was withdrawn, restoring the riverbank to its original condition.

During the 2024 Wayanad landslides, a Class 24 Bailey bridge was erected at Chooralmala to reconnect the Mundakkai to the main road. Major Gen. V T Mathew confirmed it can carry "heavy vehicles carrying loads" and will remain in place until a permanent bridge at Enathu is built at state government request. An adjacent 100‑ft improvised footbridge using Bailey panels allows rapid evacuation and movement of rescue equipment during clearance operations.
