= 2020 Pettimudi landslide =

Landslide in Kerala, South India

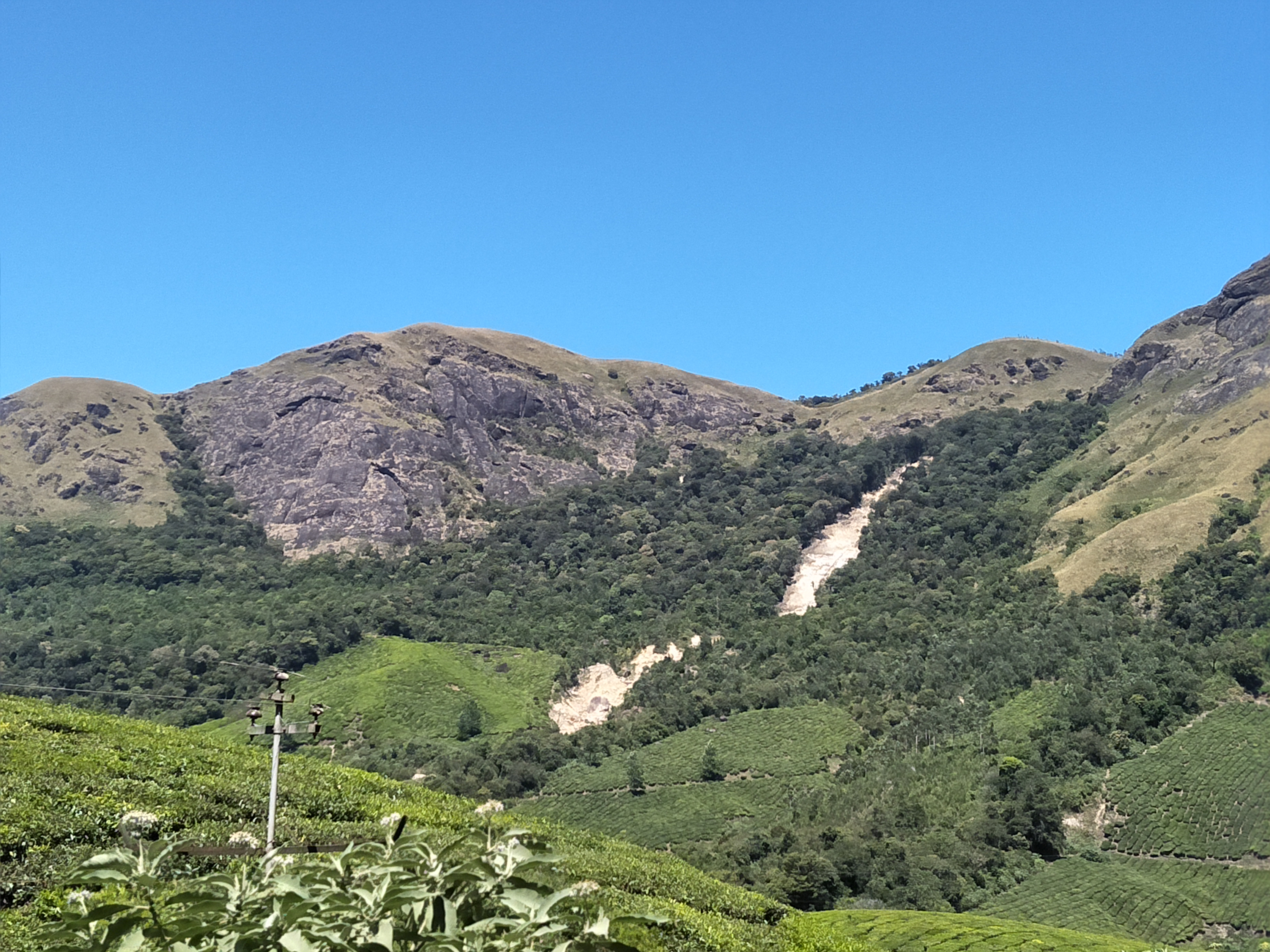
- Taken on 2021
- Date: 6 August 2020
- Location: Pettimudi, Munnar, Idukki District, Kerala, India; 10°10′6″N 77°0′41″E
- Type: Landslide
- Deaths: 66
- Missing: 4

On 6 August 2020, 66 people died in Pettimudi, Idukki in the South Indian state of Kerala due to a landslide. The bodies of 4 people, who are believed to be trapped underground have not yet been found.

== Landslide ==
The boulder burst from the border of the Eravikulam National Park with a loud noise and fell into the Pettimudi river destroying the labor camps two kilometers below. The houses where the workers of Kannandevan Hills Plantation lived were destroyed. Most of the people could not escape because they were asleep. The electricity connection was interrupted and the tragedy came to the outside world late. The area got covered with soil up to a height of ten feet and huge rocks fell in many places.

== Rescue operations ==
Pettimudi is located on a hill more than 30 km from Munnar. At the time of the landslide, there was no mobile phone coverage or landline facility. The bridge on the road was washed away because of which the rescuers could not reach in time. A 50-member team of the National Disaster Response Force and the Kerala Fire and Rescue participated in the rescue operation. The possibility of an air rescue mission was also sought but the attempt was not made due to bad weather. The search was called off when 26 bodies were found on the first day. On the second day, 16 more bodies were recovered. The bodies of those found were cremated. Trained search dogs were also used. A 10-month-old Belgian Malinois police dog, Lily, found the bodies of three people buried under the ground. Six more bodies were found on the third day. The dead bodies were recovered from the river and forest area three kilometers away from the accident site.

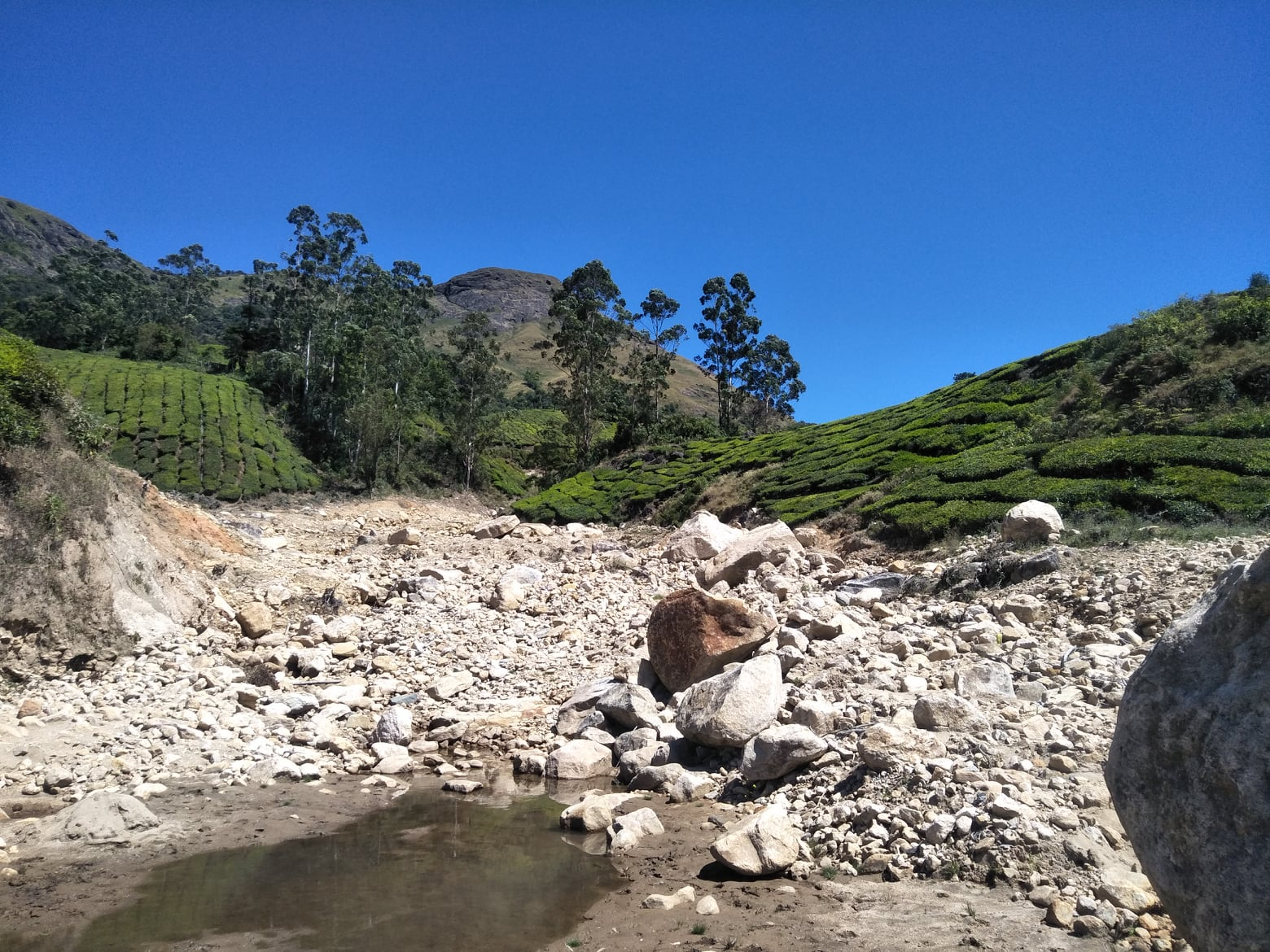
Taken on 2022

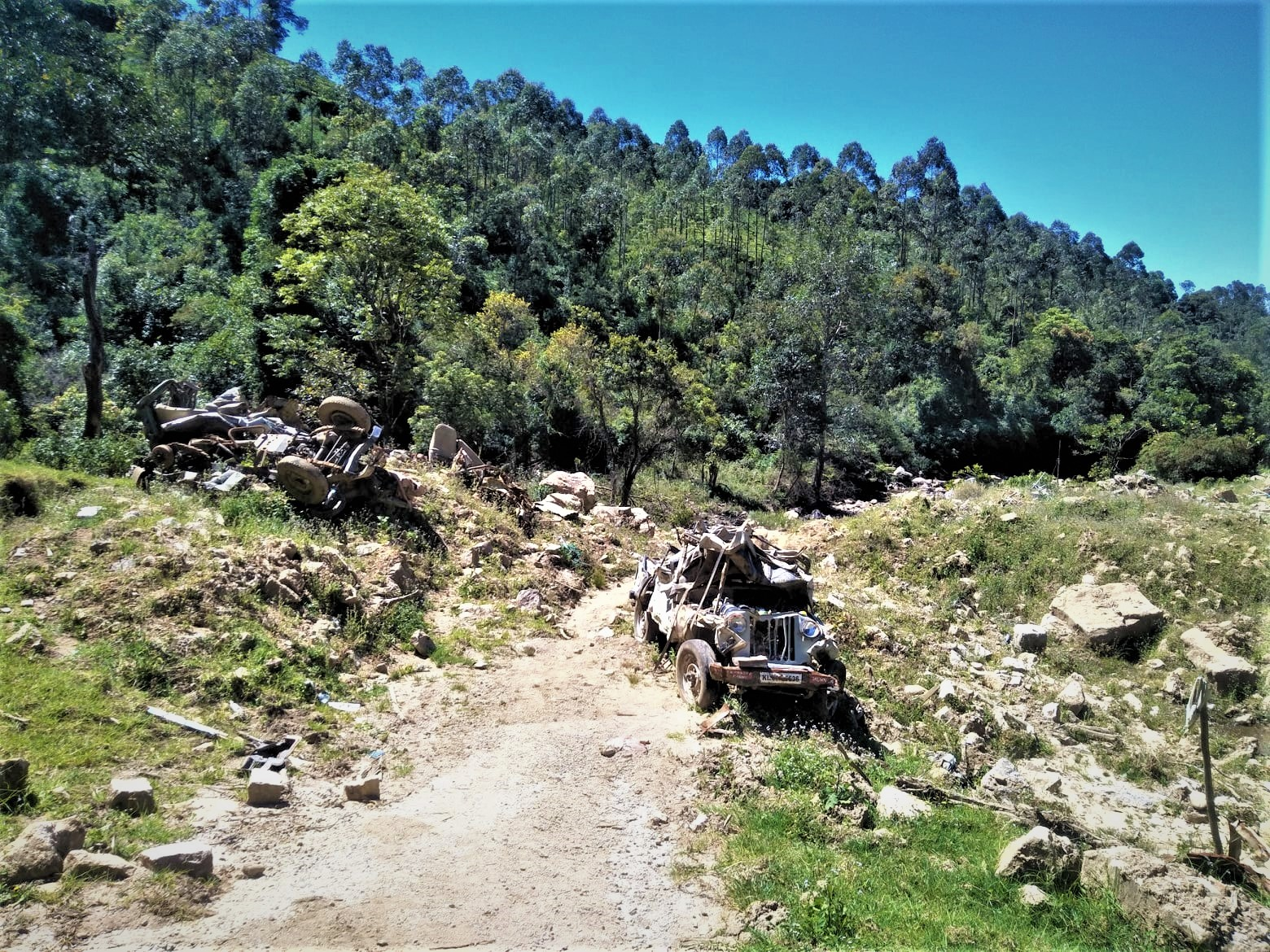
Taken on 2022

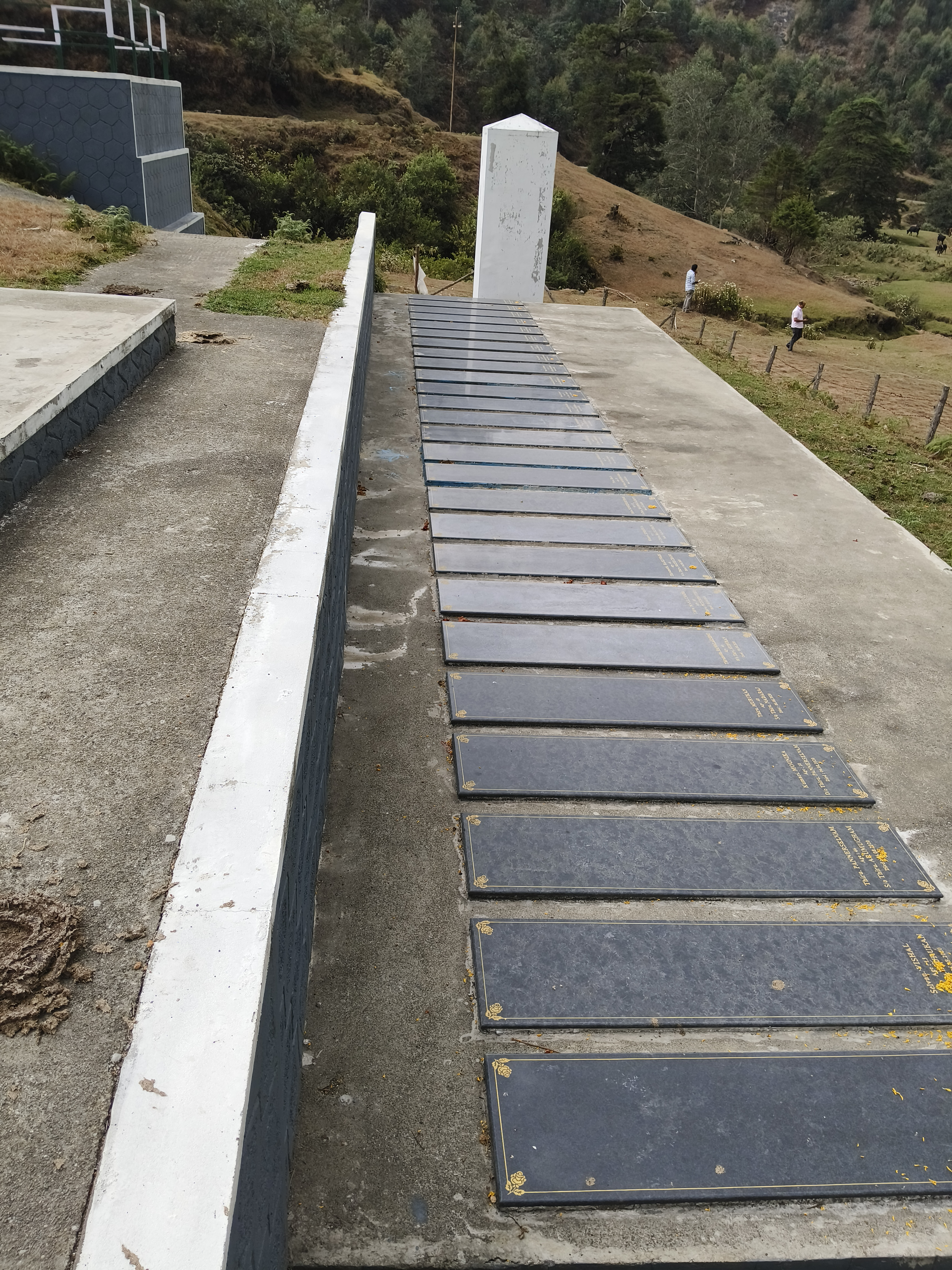
Victims' graveyard

== See also ==
- 2020 Kerala floods
- 2024 Wayanad landslides
- Amboori
