= Kanthanpara Waterfalls =

Waterfalls in Kerala, India

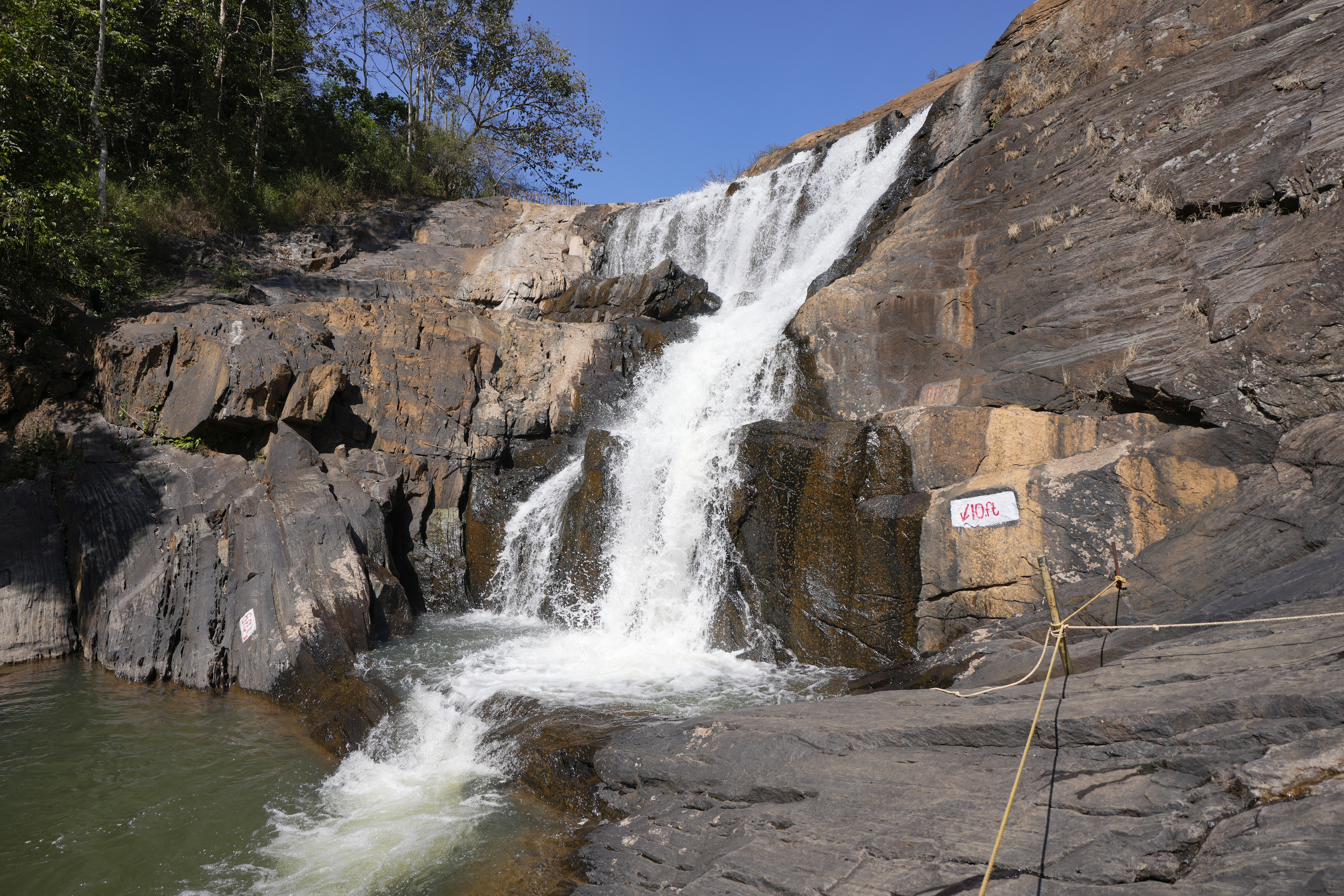
- Interactive map of Kanthanpara Waterfalls
- Location: Meppadi, Wayanad district, Kerala, India
- Coordinates: 11°31′22.7″N 76°9′12.6″E
- Total height: 30 m (98 ft)

Kanthapara Falls is a waterfall in Wayanad district of Kerala, India. It is located 8 km east of Meppadi and has a total height of around 30 meters. It is also at a distance of 22 km from Kalpatta, 23 km from Sultan Bathery and 57 km from Mananthavadi. Kanthanpara Falls can be seen like a silver thread when viewed from the Soochipara Falls.

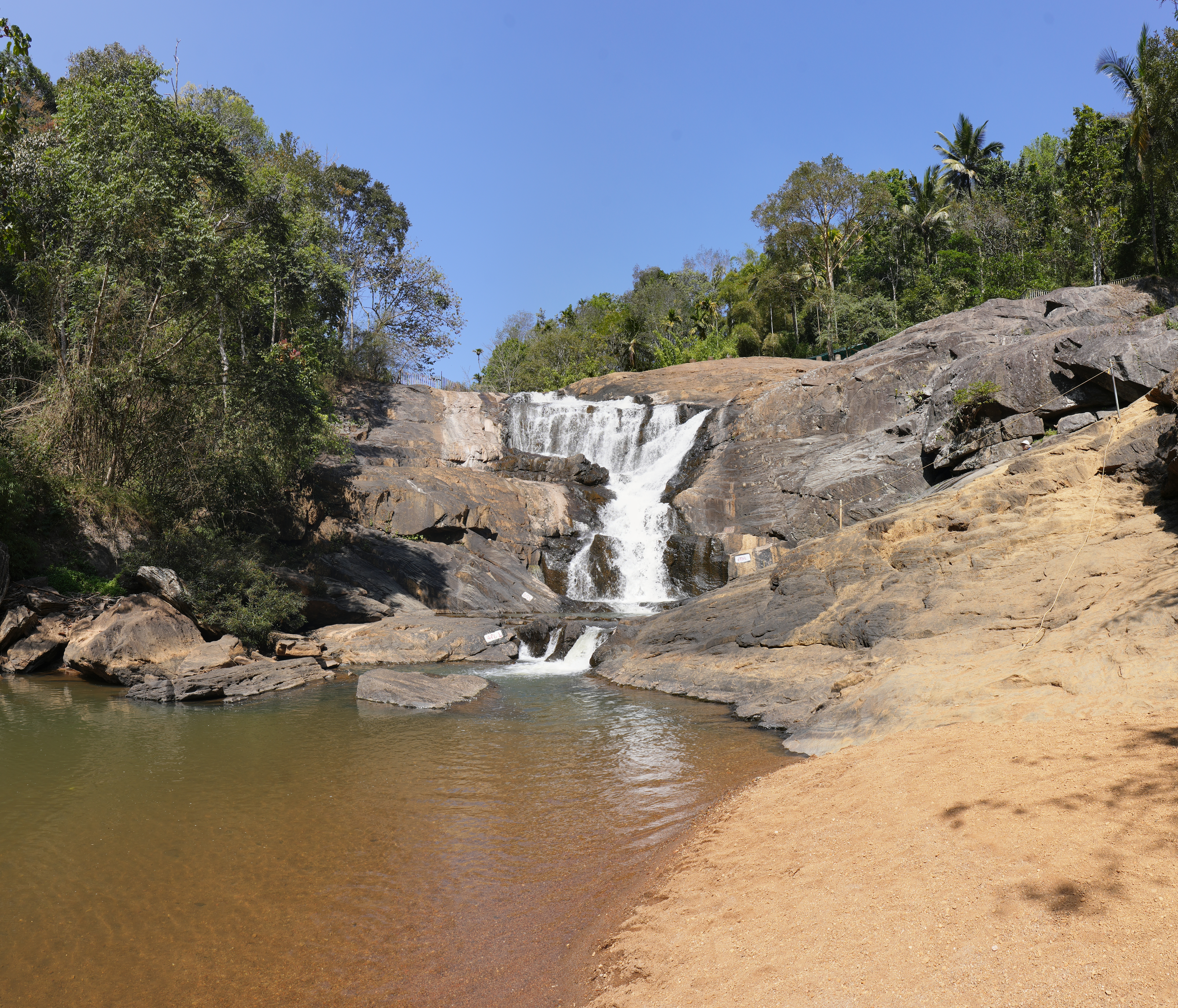

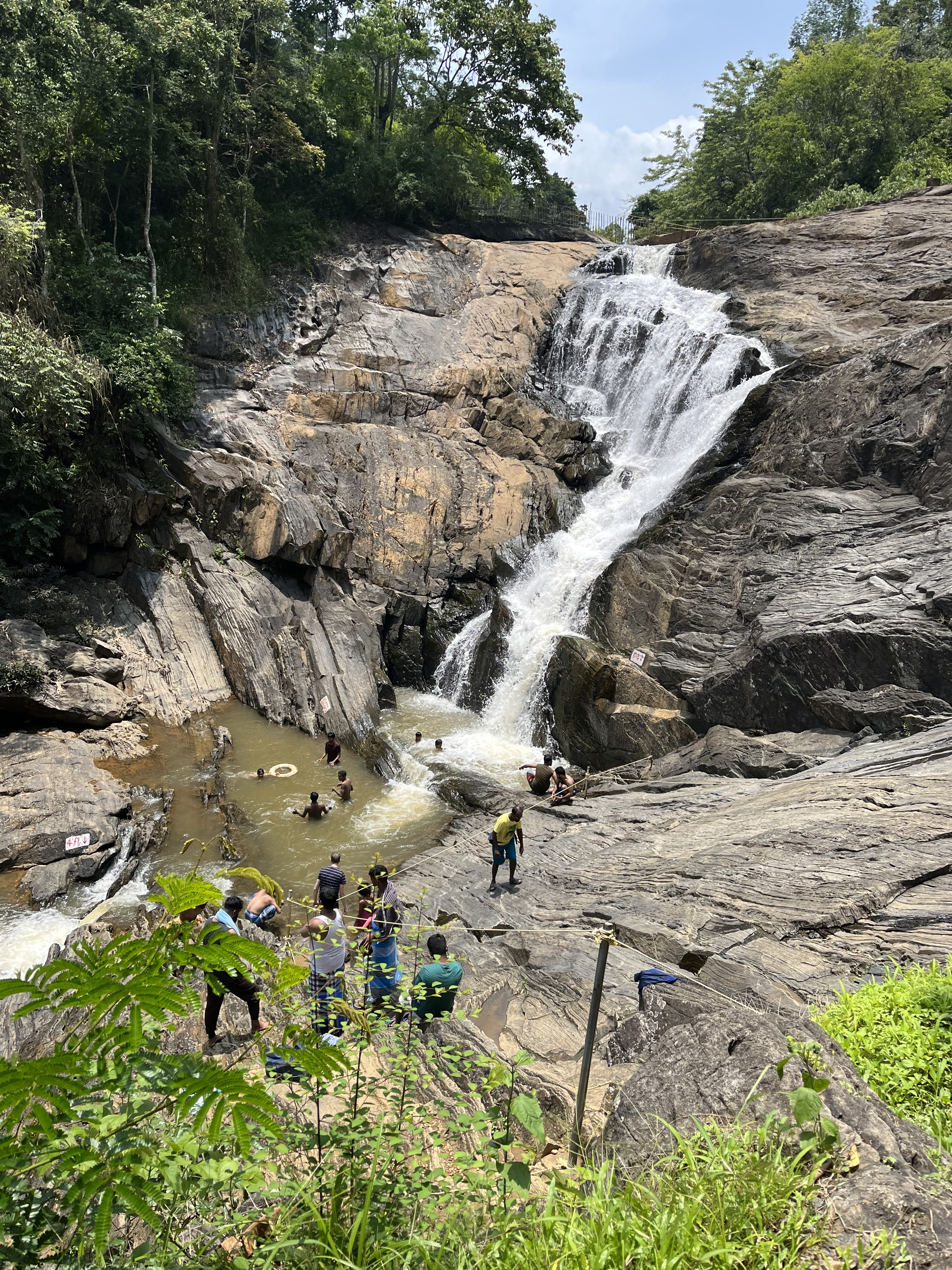

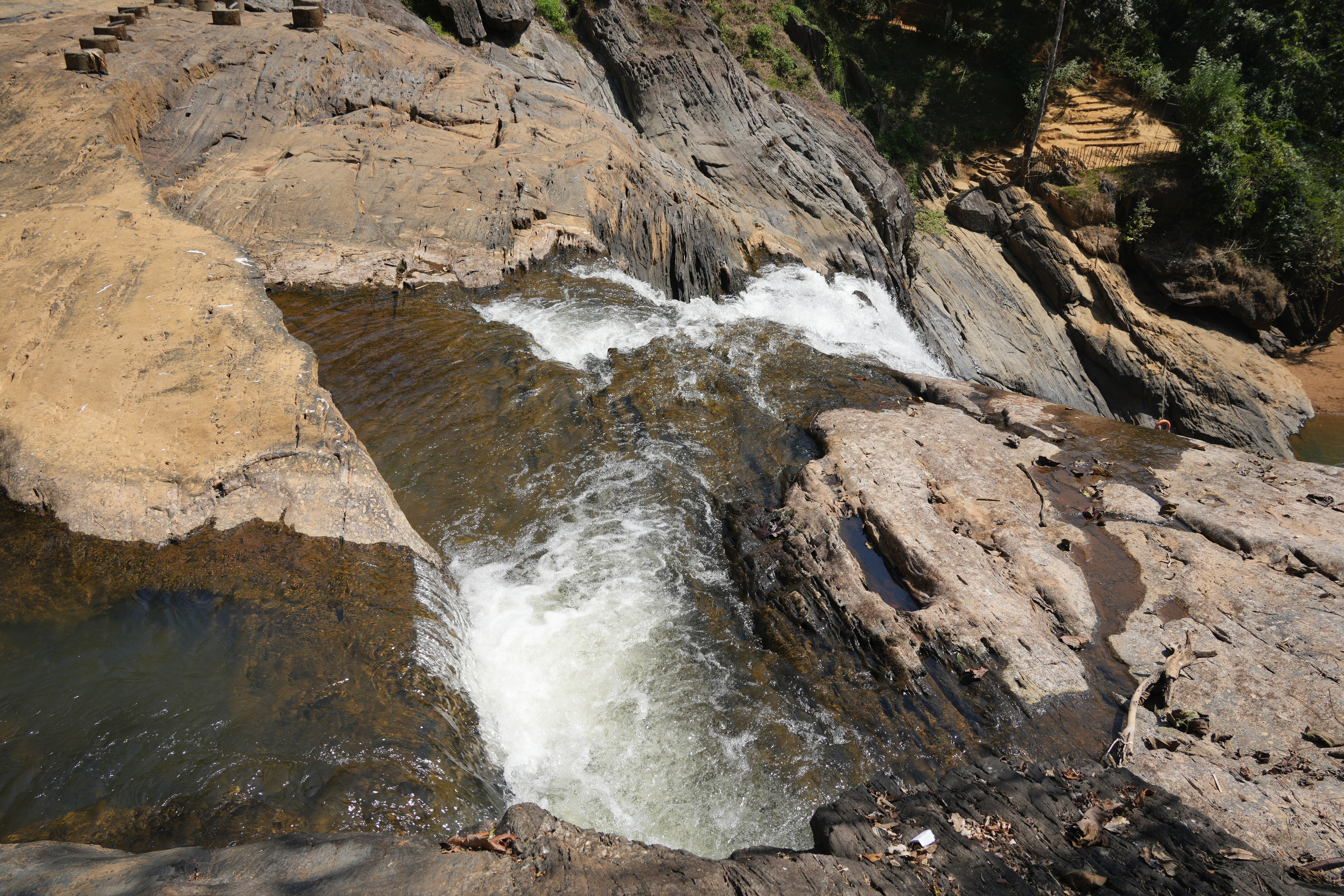
