= White Guard =

(The) White Guard(s) may refer to:

== Armed groups ==
- Anti-Communist Volunteer Militia, Italy, in Slovene Bela Garda, meaning "white guard"
- White Army or White Guard, the military arm of the Russian White movement
- White Guard (Finland), part of the White Army during the 1918 Finnish Civil War
- White Guards, a name applied to the Slovene Home Guard during World War II

== Arts and entertainment ==
- The White Guard, a 1925 novel by Mikhail Bulgakov about the Russian White movement
- The White Guard, a 2023 Canadian documentary film
- The White Guard (TV series), a Russian TV series based on the novel by Bulgakov

== Other uses ==
- White Guard Volunteers (Kerala India), a volunteer flood rescue group in Kerala, India

== See also ==
- White Guardian, a fictional character in Doctor Who
