= Enathu Bridge =

Bridge in India

Coordinates: 9.0884°N 76.7544°E

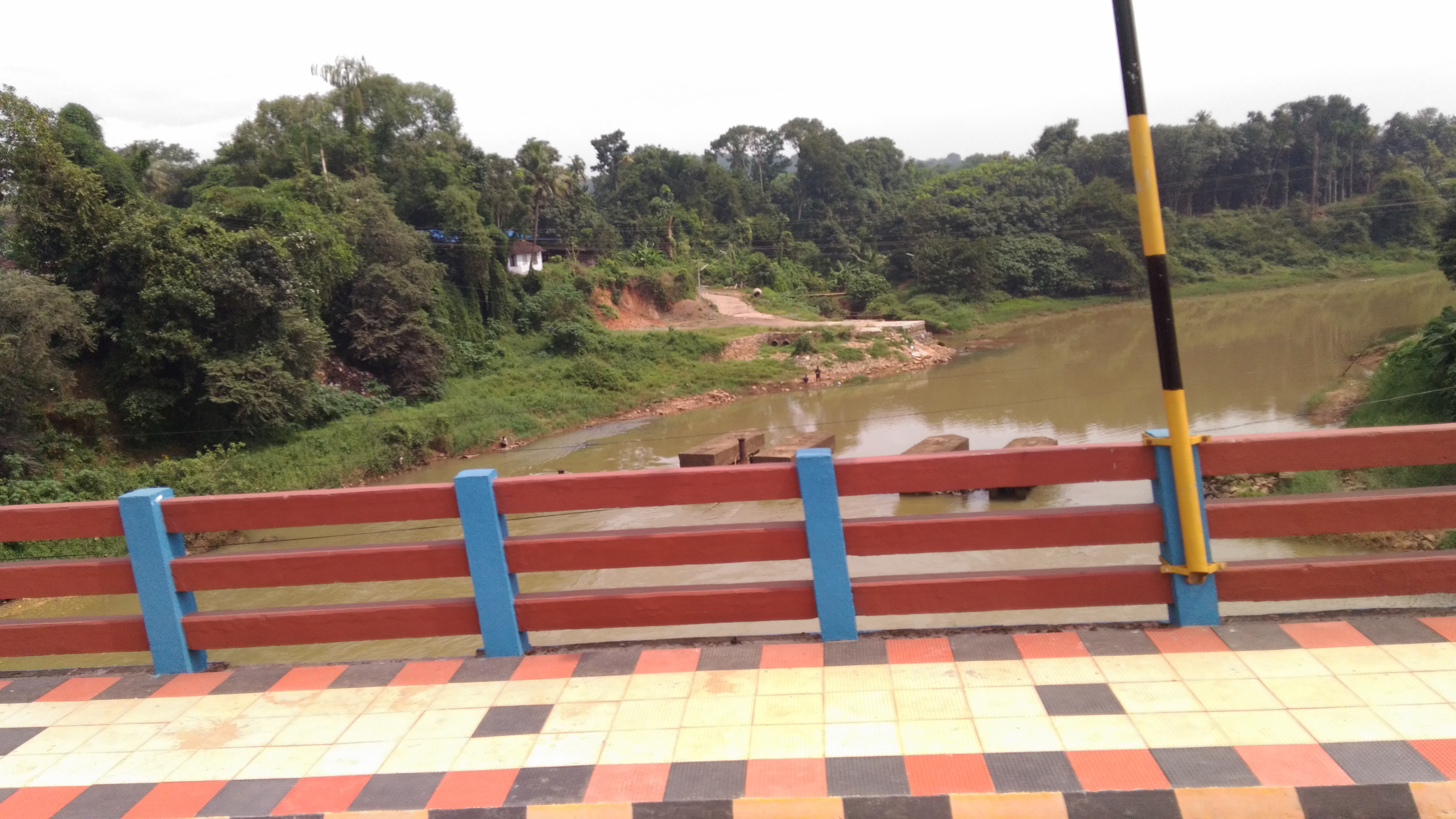
Enathu Bridge

Enathu Bridge is one of the main bridges in Main Central Road. It is situated in Enathu, Kerala and is connecting Kollam district with Pathanamthitta district. It is constructed in latest form in 2017 over Kallada River.

== History ==
The first bridge in Enathu was built by British in early 1903. In 1980's this bridge was found old and unsafe for traffic and a new concrete bridge was built during Third Nayanar ministry when P. J. Joseph was the PWD minister in 1998.

In January 2017 when cracks detected on this bridge and it was closed for maintenance. On August 31, 2017 the bridge reopened for public transport. During the re-construction of the bridge, Indian Army had set up a Bailey bridge in Enathu to facilitate transportation between Adoor and Kottarakkara.

== See also ==
- Enathu Bailey bridge
- Palarivattom Flyover Scam
- Goshree bridges
- Chamravattom Regulator-cum-Bridge
