= Enathu =

- Town
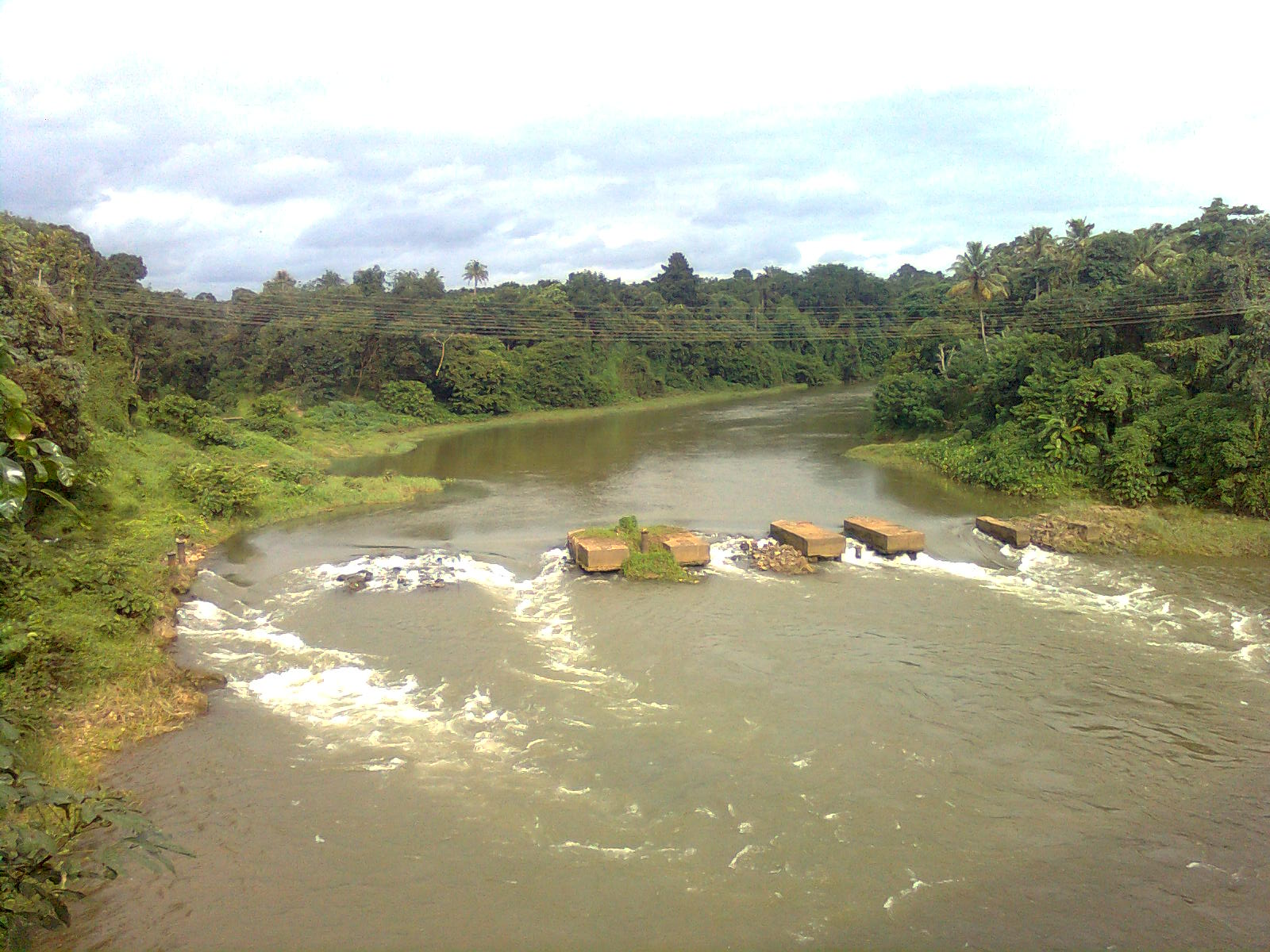
- View of Kallada River from Enathu Bridge

- Location in Kerala, India Enathu (India)
- Coordinates: 9°5′27″N 76°45′19″E
- Country: India
- State: Kerala
- District: Pathanamthitta

Population (2014)
  - Total: 20,540

Languages
  - Official: Malayalam, English
- Time zone: UTC+5:30 (IST)
- PIN: 691526
- Telephone code: 04734
- Vehicle registration: KL-26 (Adoor sub RTO),..
- Nearest city: Adoor and Kottarakkara

Enathu is a village in Adoor Thaluk of Pathanamthitta district in the state of Kerala, India.

== Location ==
It is located 8 km away from the central Adoor Municipality. In the center lies Adoor. To the east lies Kottarakkara.

== Description ==
The town borders Kollam district. Enathu is famous with the old British-made bridge (demolished) across the Kallada River, which links the two districts of Pathanamthitta and Kollam with MC (Main Central). Enathu is one of the few towns which is linked all over Kerala and some parts of Tamil Nadu. Enathu Mahadevar Temple (Lord Shiva) is situated in the Enathu junction.

== History ==
The famous Britishers Madeline and other engineers visited Enathu, building bridges and other facilities for the people living there. Enathu was never directly under British rule.

== Demographics ==
According to the 2014 Kerala Census, Enathu had a population of 20,540 people.

== See also ==
- Enathu Bailey bridge
