= Chooralmala =

Village in Kerala, India

- Village
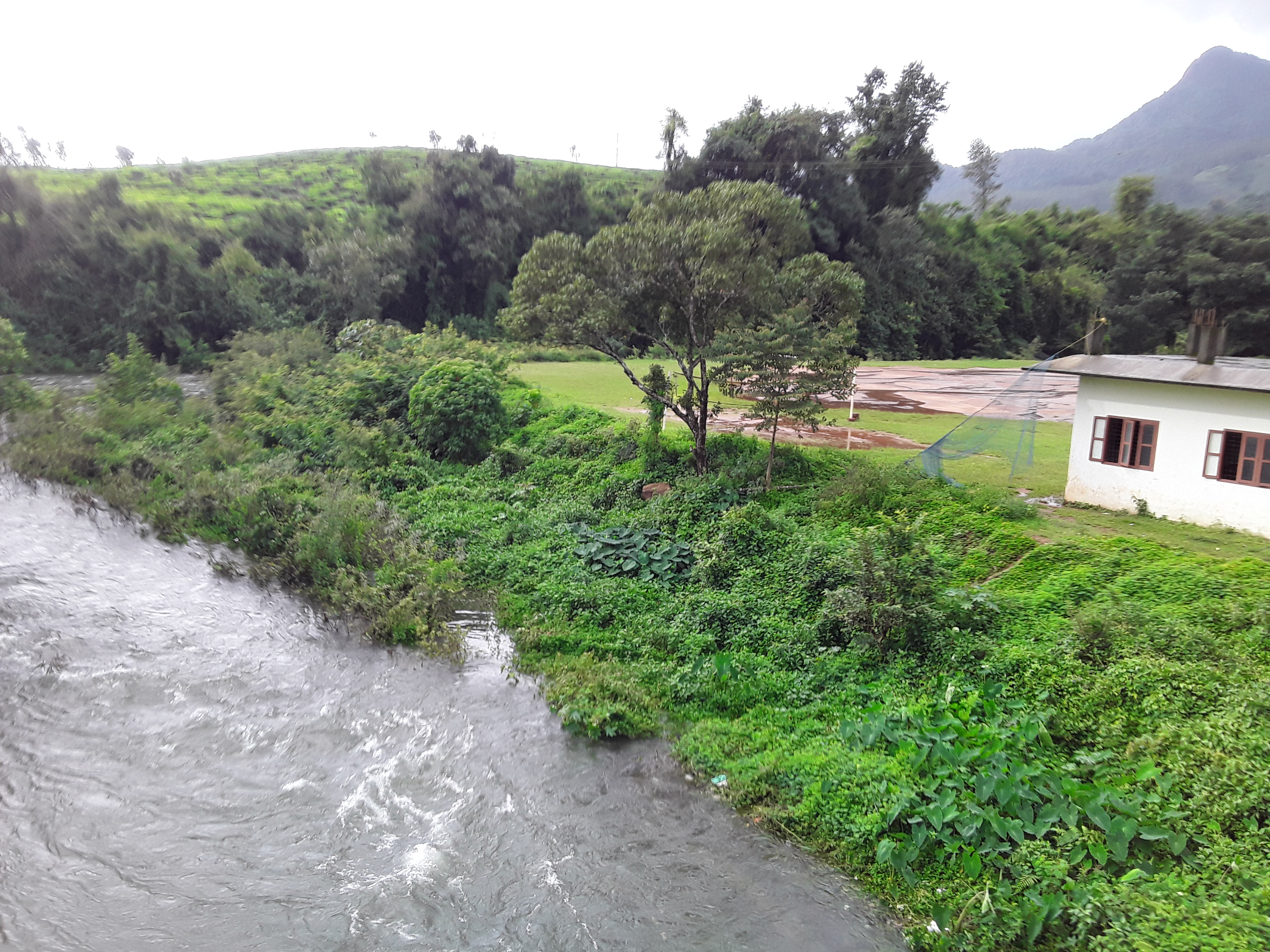
- View of river side and Chooralmala School

- Location in Kerala, India Chooralmala (India)
- Coordinates: 11.5021553°N 76.1548412°E
- Country: India
- State: Kerala
- District: Wayanad

Government
  - Type: Panchayat Ward

Languages
  - Official: Malayalam
- Time zone: UTC+5:30 (IST)
- PIN: 673 121
- Telephone code: 04936
- Vehicle registration: KL-72
- Nearest city: Meppadi
- Lok Sabha constituency: Wayanad
- Assembly Constituency: Kalpetta

Chooralmala is a village located in the Meppadi panchayat in Wayanad district in the state of Kerala, India.

== Geography ==
Chooralmala is a small village and hillstation in Meppadi panchayat, Vythiri taluk, Wayanad district in the Western Ghats mountain range.

== Landslides at Chooralmala in 2024 ==
Wayanad landslides were the landslides that occurred in Punjirimattom, Mundakkai, Chooralmala, and Vellarimala villages in Meppadi panchayat, Vythiri taluk in Wayanad district, Kerala, India, in the early hours of 30 July 2024. Heavy rains triggered the collapse of hillsides, resulting in torrents of mud, water, and boulders cascading down onto the area. The landslides marked one of the deadliest natural disasters in Kerala's history with reports of at least 400+ deaths.

== See also ==
- 2024 Wayanad landslides
- Wayanad district
- Kalpetta Assembly constituency
