= Sobha LLC =

Real estate developer

Shobha Group LLC
- Company type: Private
- Industry: Real estate
- Founded: 1976
- Founder: P. N. C. Menon
- Headquarters: Dubai, United Arab Emirates
- Services: Commercial and residential property development
- Revenue: US$1billion
- Website: www.sobharealty.com

Sobha Group LLC is a GCC based real estate developer headquartered in Dubai . The company was established in 1976 as an interior decoration firm in Oman by Mr P. N. C. Menon. The company is functional in the UAE, Oman, Bahrain, and Brunei. Sobha Group LLC was the subject of a case study at Harvard Business School. It recorded a sales target of US$1 billion in 2021.

Sobha Realty has been credited for incorporating digital transformation in the real estate sector and reinventing the value chain by utilizing its built-in conceptualization, design, and development capabilities.

The company uses a backward integrated model to ensure high standards in quality across projects.

Sobha Realty signed a charitable grant agreement with a UAE backed aid programme foundation, a pact under which they will construct a university in Dubai at a cost of 400-million UAE Dirham over the next four years. Sobha Realty and UAE’s Mohammed bin Rashid Al Maktoum Global Initiatives (MBRGI) will also establish a 1 billion UAE Dirham endowment fund, which is intended to support the education of millions.

== Key People ==
Mr P.N.C. Menon is the Founder and Chairman of Sobha Group LLC. P.N.C. Menon hails from Palakkad in Kerala, and established Sobha Group, a multinational real estate and construction group with diversified investments in the UAE, Oman, Bahrain, Brunei, and Tanzania.

== Masterplan Communities ==
=== Sobha Hartland ===
Sobha Realty is currently developing Sobha Hartland, a community spread across eight million square feet launched in 2014 in the heart of Dubai, as part of the Mohammed Bin Rashid Al Maktoum City (MBR City) master development. The project, which is estimated at US$4 billion, with 2.4 million square feet of its total land area encompassing over 300 different species of plants and trees. The development also houses the Hartland International School and North London Collegiate School Dubai.

=== District One ===
The Meydan Sobha “District One” project was launched in Phase-1 and Phase-2, with an overall value of US$8 billion.
