= Edakkal =

- Village
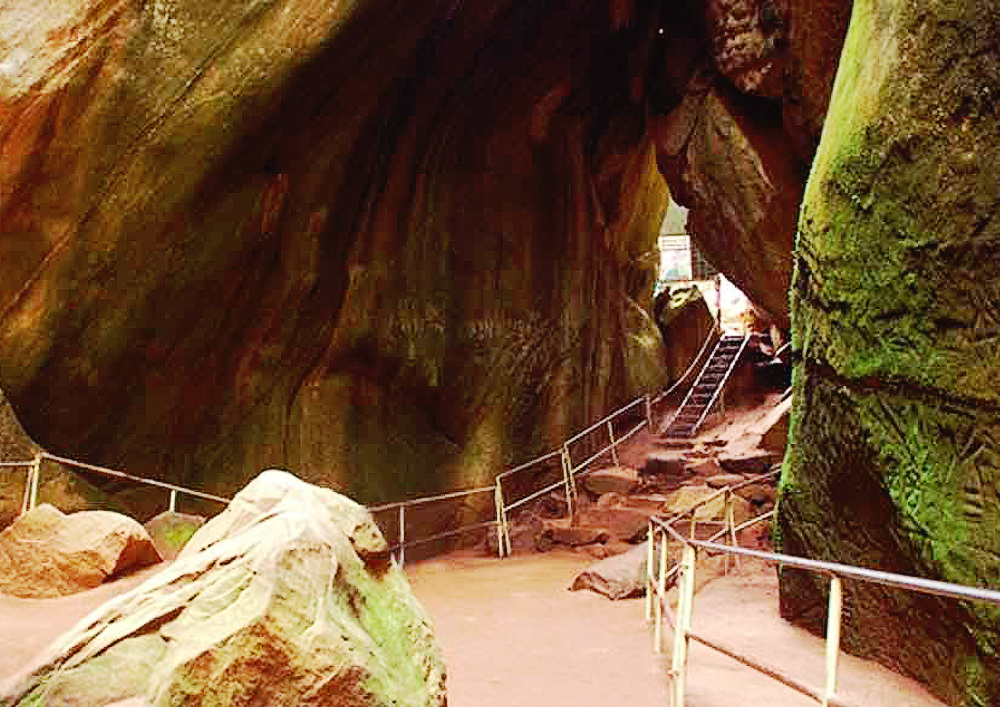
- Edakkal Caves

- Location in Kerala, India Edakkal (India)
- Coordinates: 11°37′0″N 76°13′0″E
- Country: India
- State: Kerala
- District: Wayanad
- Settled: 4th millennium BCE

Languages
  - Official: Malayalam, English
- Time zone: UTC+5:30 (IST)
- Vehicle registration: KL-73

Edakkal is a remote location in Wayanad district of Kerala, India, the site of the Edakkal Caves. The tallest mountain in the district, Ambukuthi mala, is located here.

Above the caves are views of the mountainous junction of the states of Kerala, Tamil Nadu and Karnataka. The nearest major town is Sulthan Bathery that is around 12 km away, while the closest urban centre is Ambalavayal that is located at a distance of 4 km.

== Edakkal Caves ==
Three pre-historic caves known as the Edakkal Caves, dating from at least 5000 BC, had been discovered on Ambukuthi mala. There are stone age pictorial writings on the walls of these natural caves. In late 2007, a major effort had been initiated by several archaeologists - both Indian and Western to have the UNESCO declare the site of the Edakkal Caves a World Heritage Centre.

There are seemingly different sets of works. The older group of cave paintings and engravings, going back at least 7000 years, depict pre-historic tribal chieftains, elephants, queens and tools. A less ancient script from the 3rd or 4th century BC is also seen in the complex of caves.

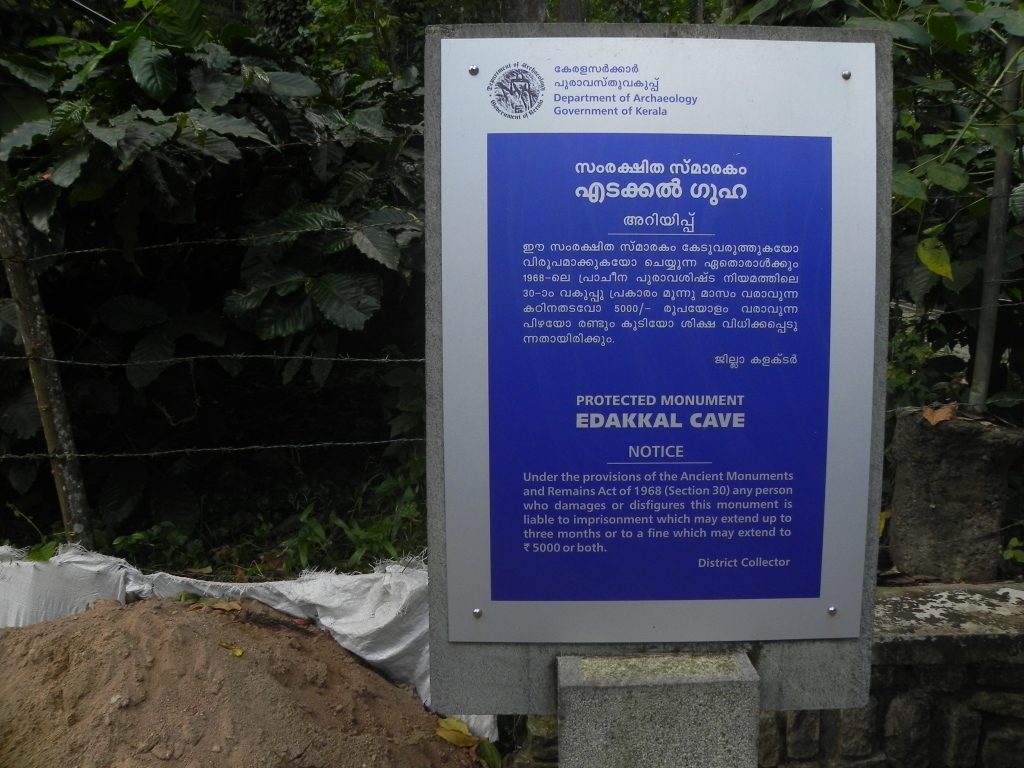
Information Board at Edakkal
