= Thrikkaipatta =

- village
- Nickname: Bamboo Village
- Country: India
- State: Kerala
- District: Wayanad

Population (2011)
  - Total: 8,551

Languages
  - Official: Malayalam, English
- Time zone: UTC+5:30 (IST)
- PIN: 673577
- ISO 3166 code: IN-KL
- Vehicle registration: KL-12

Thrikkaipatta is a village in Wayanad district in the state of Kerala, India.

The town is home to St. Thomas Orthodox Church part of the Sultan Bathery Diocese of the Malankara Orthodox Syrian Church.

== Demographics ==
As of 2011 India census, Thrikkaipatta had a population of 8551 with 4225 males and 4326 females.

== Transportation ==
Thrikkaipattais 70 km by road from Kozhikode railway station and this road includes nine hairpin bends. The nearest major airport is at Calicut. The road to the east connects to Mysore and Bangalore. Night journey is allowed on this sector as it goes through Bandipur national forest. The nearest railway station is Mysore. There are airports at Bangalore and Calicut.
