= Indian Veterinary Association - Kerala =

Indian professional organization

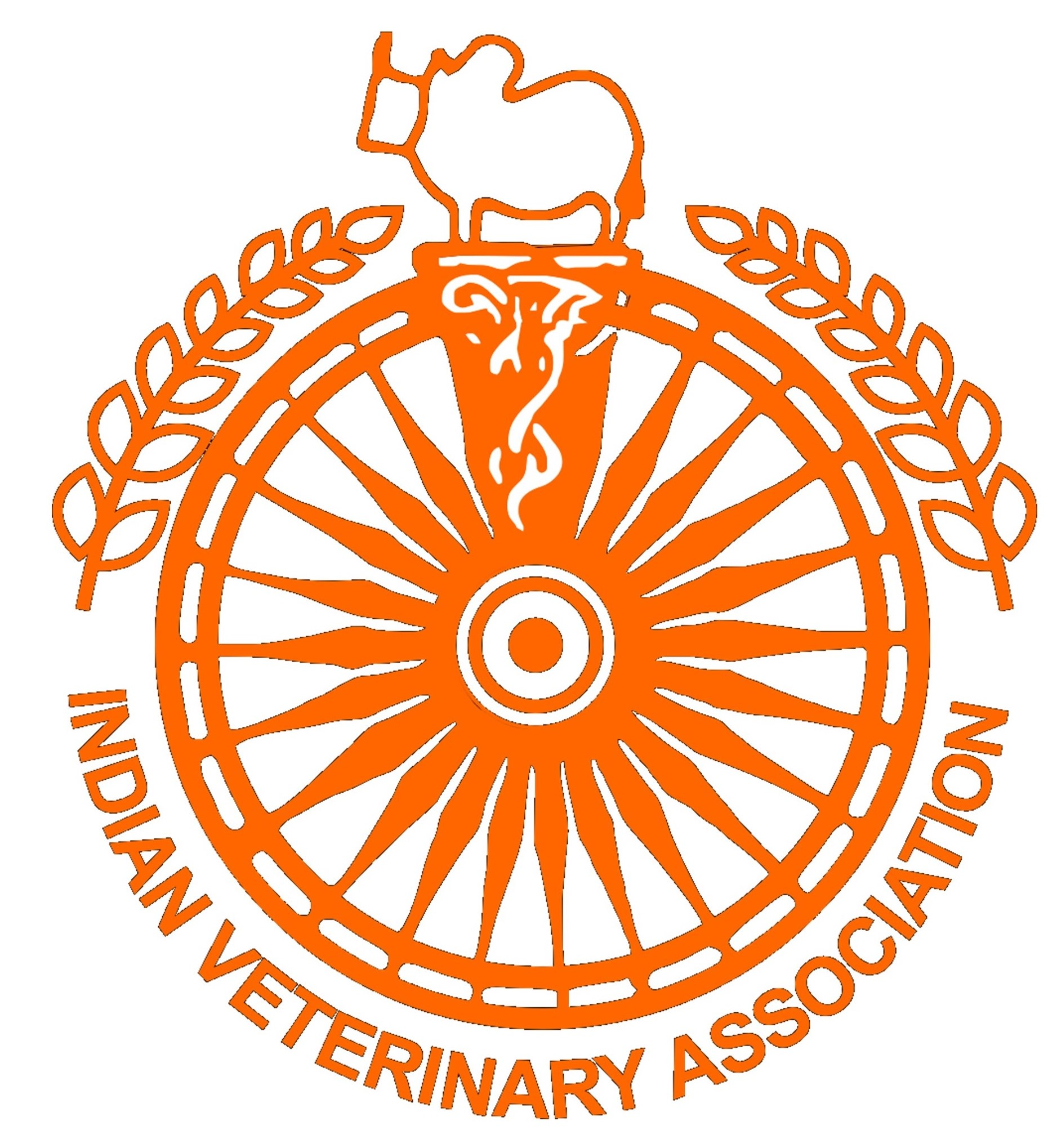
- Established: 3 December 1979 (46 years ago)
- Headquarters: Veterinarians Building, TC 25/2067(1), Dharmalayam Road, Thiruvananthapuram – 695001, Kerala, India
- Members: 2502, As on 31.12.2025
- President: Dr. V K P Mohankumar
- General Secretary: Dr. Irshad A.
- Website: www.ivakerala.com

Orphan

Indian Veterinary Association - Kerala is the largest professional organization of veterinarians working or residing in the state of Kerala, India. It was founded in the year 1978 (formally registered during 1979), and has around 2200 member veterinarians at present with units in all the 14 districts of Kerala and the two veterinary colleges under Kerala Veterinary and Animal Sciences University.

IVA Kerala was the winner of the international World Veterinary Day Award - 2020 instituted by World Veterinary Association and Health for Animals for the world's best association in embodying the theme of World Veterinary Day - 2020

Indian Veterinary Association Kerala is steadfast in bringing about continual improvement of the veterinary profession through capacity building, information sharing, and arranging suitable platforms for scientists, academics, researchers, students, field practitioners, wildlife experts, and veterinarians associated with allied sectors for providing insights into recent trends and strategies to face the challenges in the present times.

Indian Veterinary Association – Kerala is dedicated to protect and preserve animal and public health by promoting scientific veterinary practice through maintaining high standards of professionalism and ethics. IVA Kerala organizes a number of programs like Kerala Veterinary Science Congress, Continuous Veterinary Education programs, Commemoration of important days like World Veterinary Day, World Zoonoses Day, Rabies Day, leadership camps, and the Annual Convention of Veterinarians of Kerala.

== Genesis and history ==
The organization was established in the year 1978. K.J. Simon was the first president and Dr. Bharathan Namboodiripad was the first General Secretary.

== Registration and affiliations ==
Indian Veterinary Association - Kerala is registered with the Registrar, Govt. of Kerala under The Travancore-Cochin Literary, Scientific and Charitable Societies Registration Act, 1955 with effect from 03.12.1979 and the registration number is 271/1979.

IVA Kerala is an affiliate member of World Veterinary Association with effect from 31.09.2016 and also affiliated to the national chapter of Indian Veterinary Association (Affiliation No. 27/2020)

== Major activities ==
The major programs regularly organized by IVA Kerala are:

- Kerala Veterinary Science Congress.
- Veterinarians Annual Convention
- Lady Veterinarians' Convention
- World Veterinary Day Celebrations
- World Zoonoses Day Celebrations
- World Milk Day Celebrations
- National Workshop on Animal Health
- Awareness Programmes.

== Kerala Veterinary Science Congress ==
The Kerala Veterinary Science Congress (KVSC) was conceived in the year 2003 by the association and through leaps and bounds got transformed into a glorious annual, scientific meet organized by Indian Veterinary Association, Kerala, since 2010. This meet is being organized with a view to give young budding vets an opportunity to showcase their knowledge, researchers to popularise their findings, students to assess their competence, and field veterinarians to highlight their issues to a scientific forum which can possibly bring out practical solutions through applied research. The Kerala Veterinary Science Congress is organized by Indian Veterinary Association, Kerala in association with Kerala State Veterinary Council, Kerala Veterinary and Animal Science University, and Animal Husbandry Department. The 12th edition of Kerala Veterinary Science Congress will be organized during 14 and 15 November 2020.

== Publications ==
- Journal of Indian Veterinary Association - Kerala (JIVA)
- The Veterinarian Magazine
- Newsletters
