= Soochipara Falls =

- സൂചിപ്പാറ വെള്ളച്ചാട്ടം Sentinel Rock Waterfalls
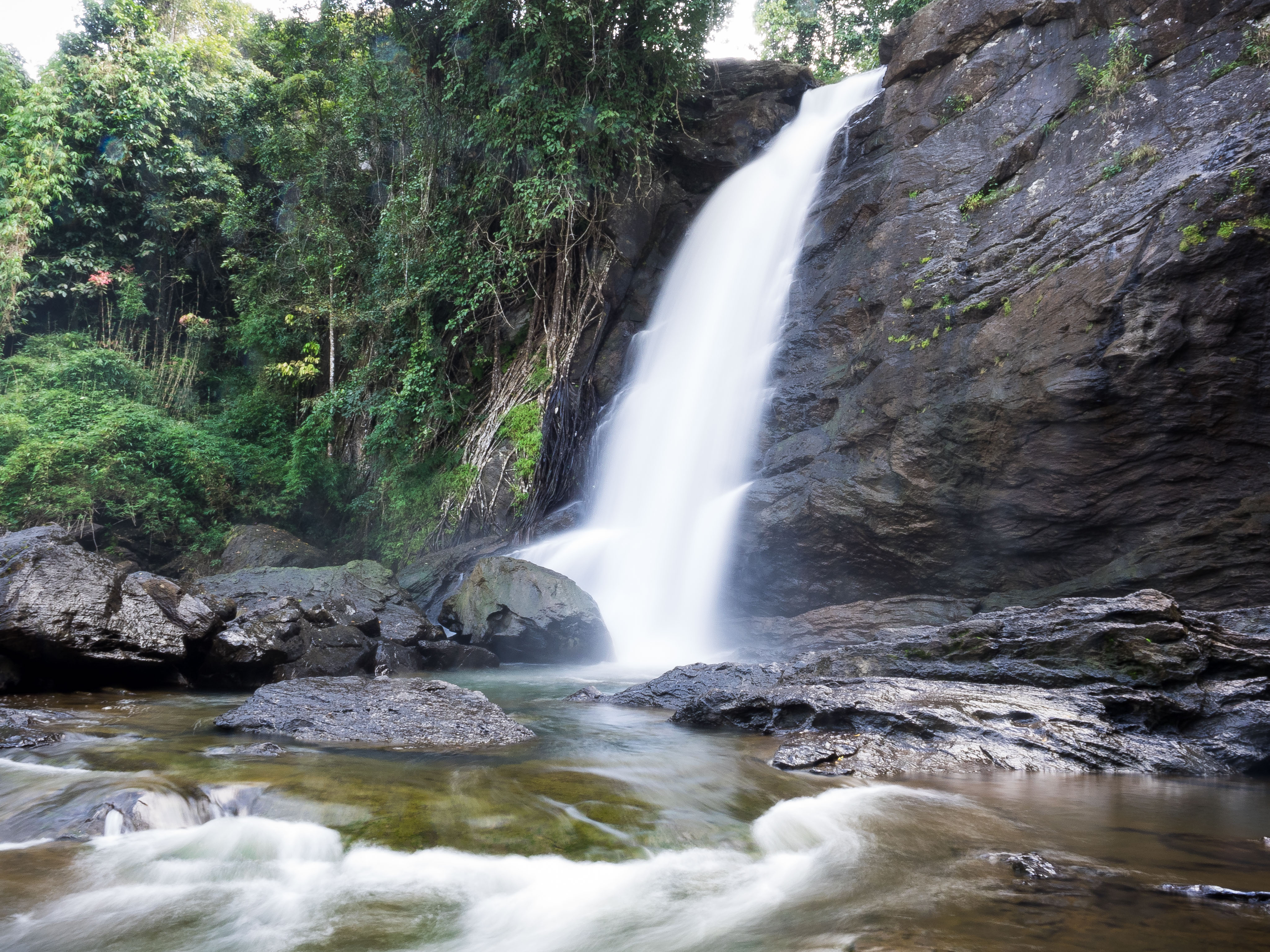
- Soochipara Falls

- Location within Kerala
- Location: Wayanad district, Kerala, India
- Coordinates: 11°30′44″N 76°9′47″E
- Total height: 200 metres (660 ft)

Soochipara Falls also known as Sentinel Rock Waterfalls is a three-tiered waterfall in Vellarimala, Wayanad, India. It is surrounded by deciduous, evergreen and montane forests. Locally referred to as Soochipara ("Soochi" meaning "Needle" and "Para" meaning "Rock"), the 15-20 minute drive from Meppadi to Sentinel Rock Waterfalls has views of a number of Wayanad's tea estates. The Sentinel Rock Waterfalls is 200 metres (656 feet) and offers a cliff face that is used for rock climbing. The water from Soochipara Falls later joins Chulika River or popularly known as Chaliyar River after Velarimala Hills near Cherambadi (Tamil Nadu) in Kerala.

Once people reach the parking area, they have to pass through a security check at the entrance where they make sure you don't carry any plastic. It takes 10-15 minutes walk to the waterfalls and water flow is less during summer, which makes it easy to reach the rocks where water falls. One have to walk around 1.2 kilometres to reach the waterfalls. It is advisable to drink enough water before the walk down to the falls,

== Gallery ==
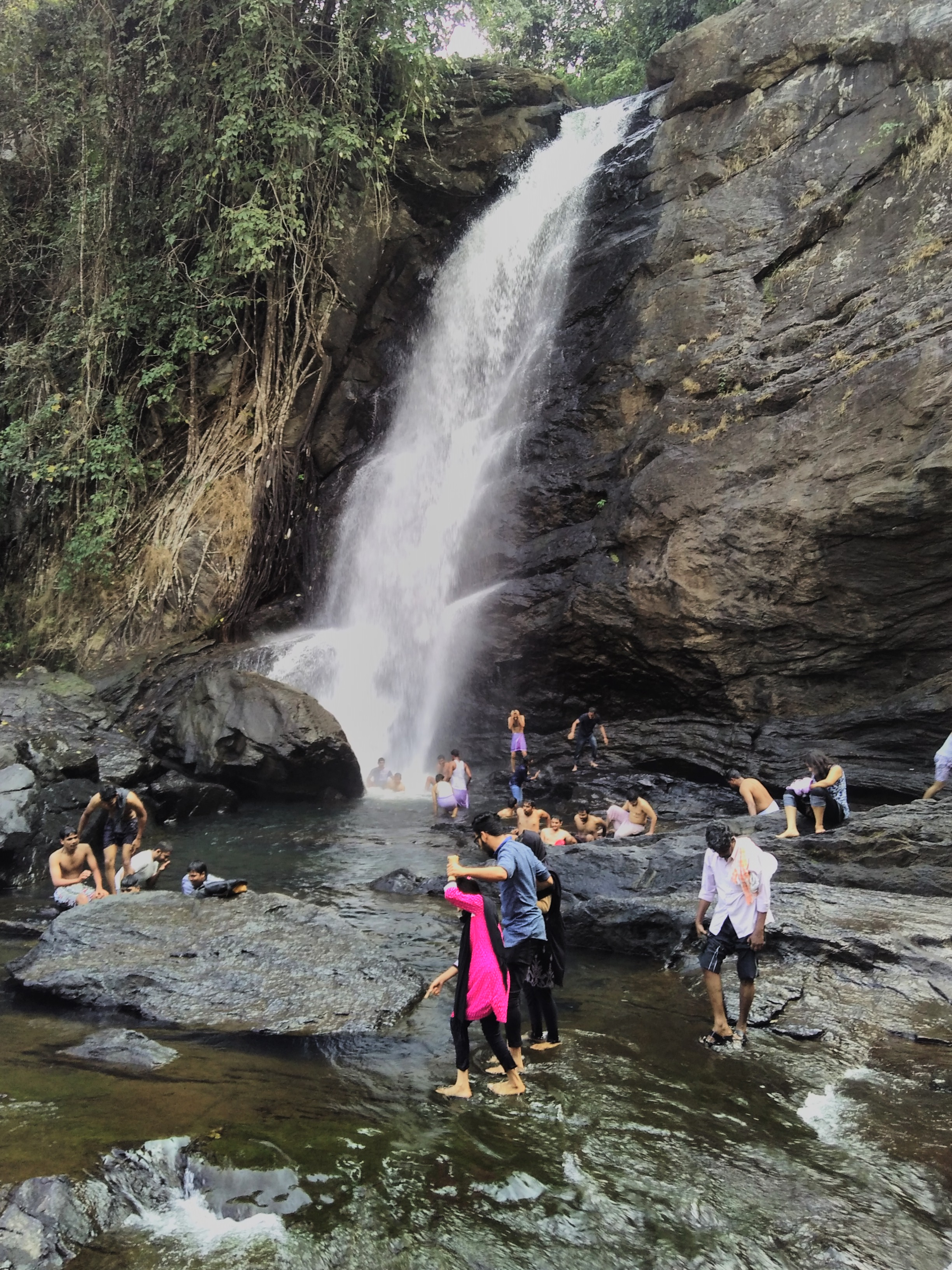
Soochipara Falls with Peoples

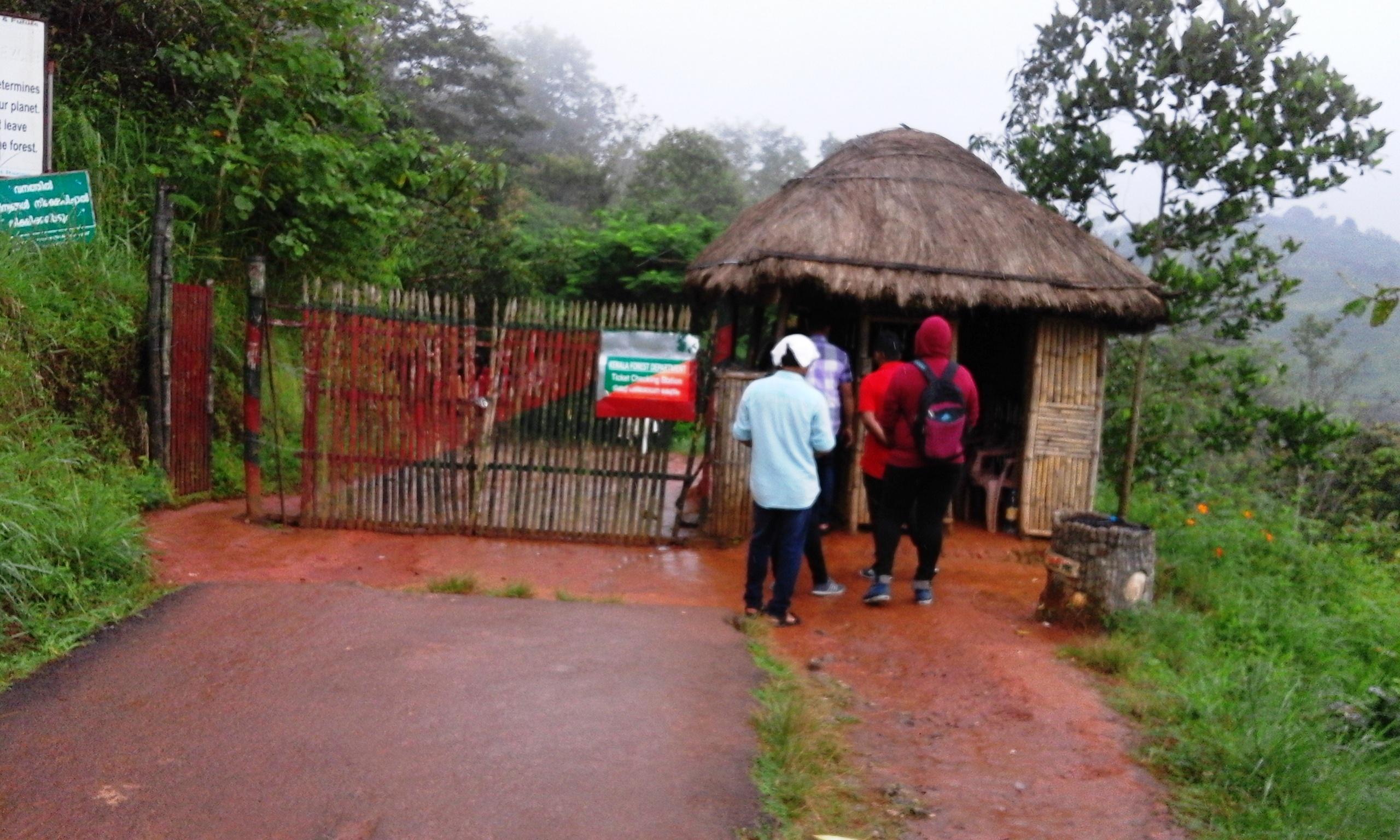
The ticket counter

== See also ==
- List of waterfalls
- List of waterfalls in India
- List of waterfalls in India by height
