= Mundakkai, Wayanad =

Village in Kerala

Mundakkai, Wayanad Mundakkai
- village
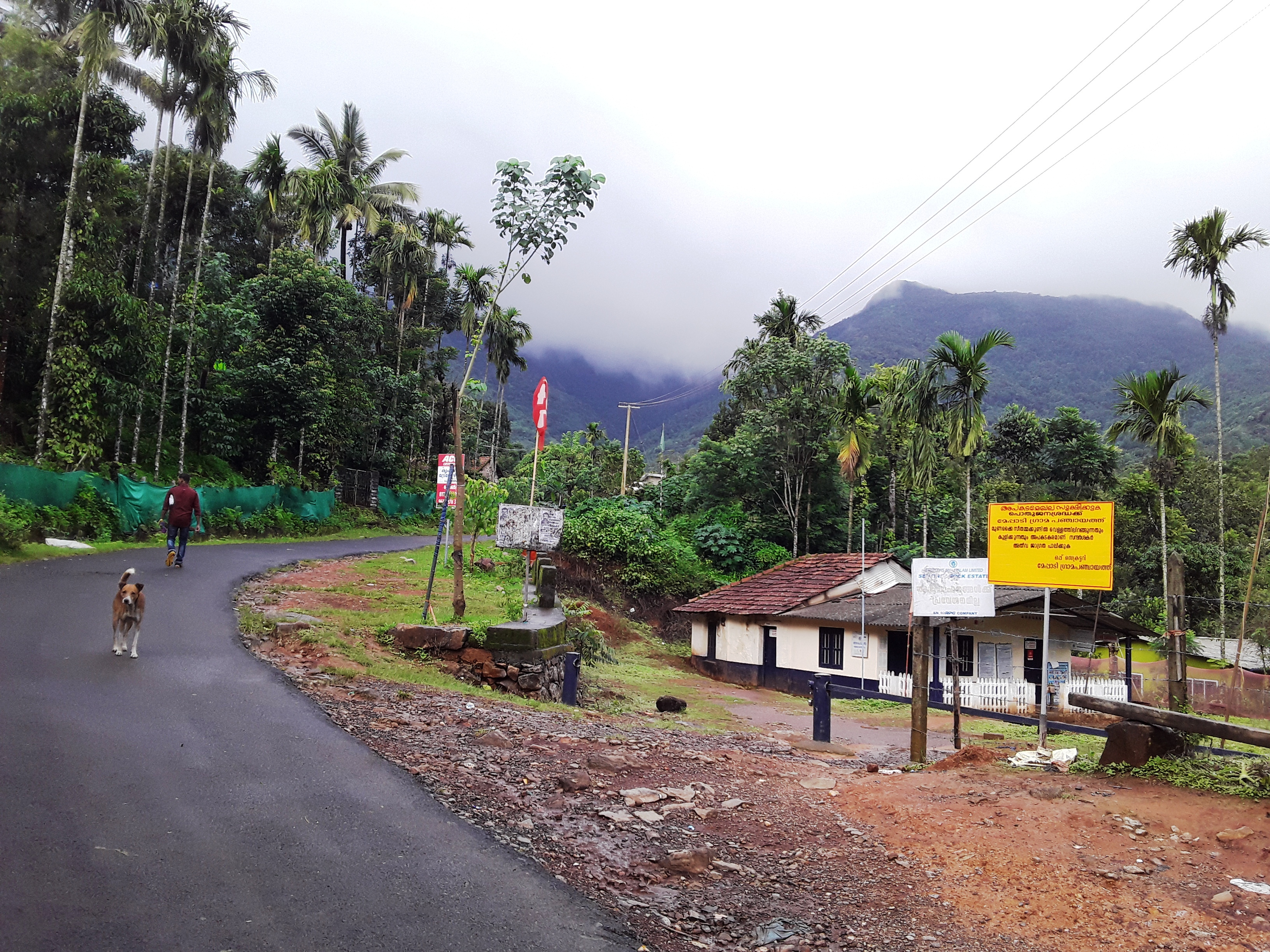

- Location in Kerala, India Mundakkai, Wayanad (India)
- Coordinates: 11.4859333°N 76.1559113°E
- Country: India
- State: Kerala
- District: Wayanad

Government
  - Type: Panchayat Ward

Languages
  - Official: Malayalam
- Time zone: UTC+5:30 (IST)
- PIN: 673 577
- Telephone code: 04936
- Vehicle registration: KL-72
- Nearest city: Meppadi
- Lok Sabha constituency: Wayanad
- Legislative Assembly constituency: Kalpetta

Mundakkai is a ghost town in Wayanad district in the state of Kerala, India. It was destroyed on July 30th 2024, due to the 2024 Wayanad Landslides.

== Geography ==
Mundakkai is a village located in Wayanad district of Kerala along the Western Ghats mountain range.

== Landslides at Mundakkai in 2024 ==
Landslides occurred near the villages of Punjirimattom, Mundakkai, Chooralmala, and Vellarimala in July 2024 due to heavy rains that triggered the collapse of hillsides. The landslides marked one of the deadliest natural disasters in Kerala's history, with reports of at least 400 deaths. Due to this landslide the entire village was swept off overnight, leaving the area virtually destroyed. The survivors were relocated to Kalpetta.

== See also ==
- Wayanad district
- Kalpetta Assembly constituency
- 2024 Wayanad landslides
