= List of tourist attractions in Kasaragod =

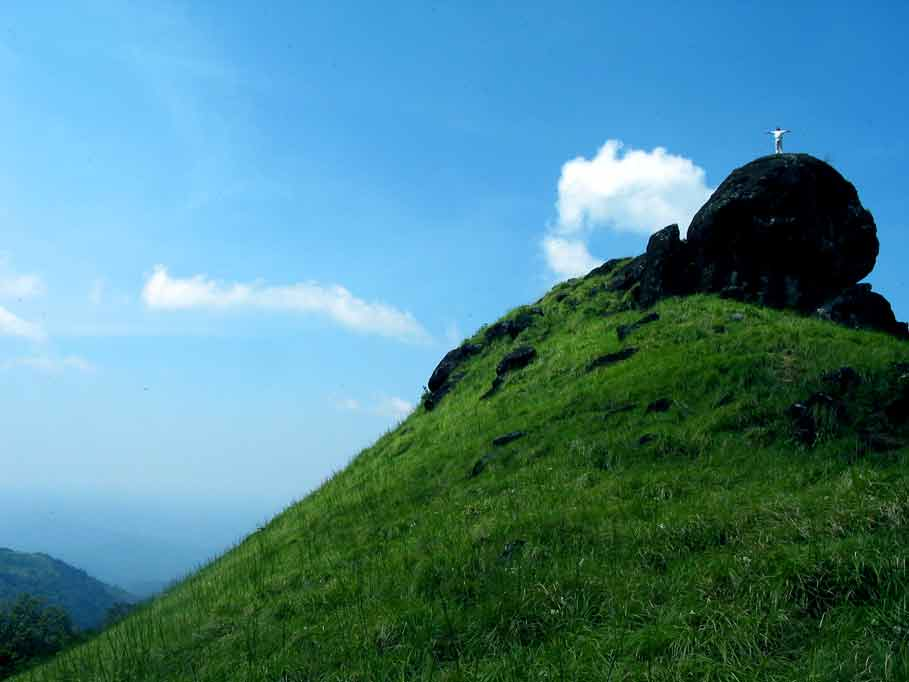
Ranipuram Hill Station

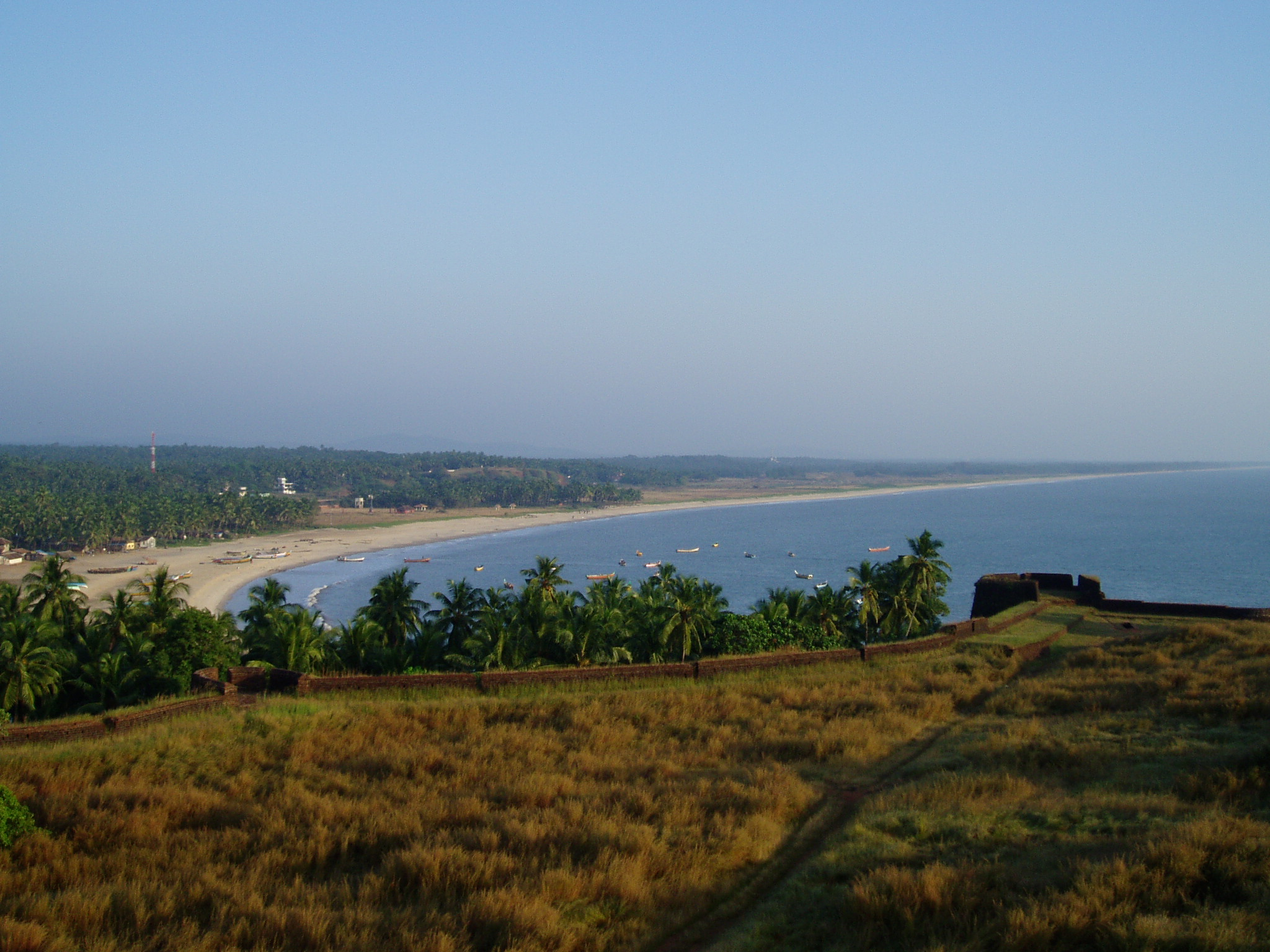
Bekal Fort

- Bekal Fort - 15 km from Kasaragod Town.
- Chandragiri Fort located 8 km from town.
- Malik Deenar Mosque, a mosque at Thalangara.
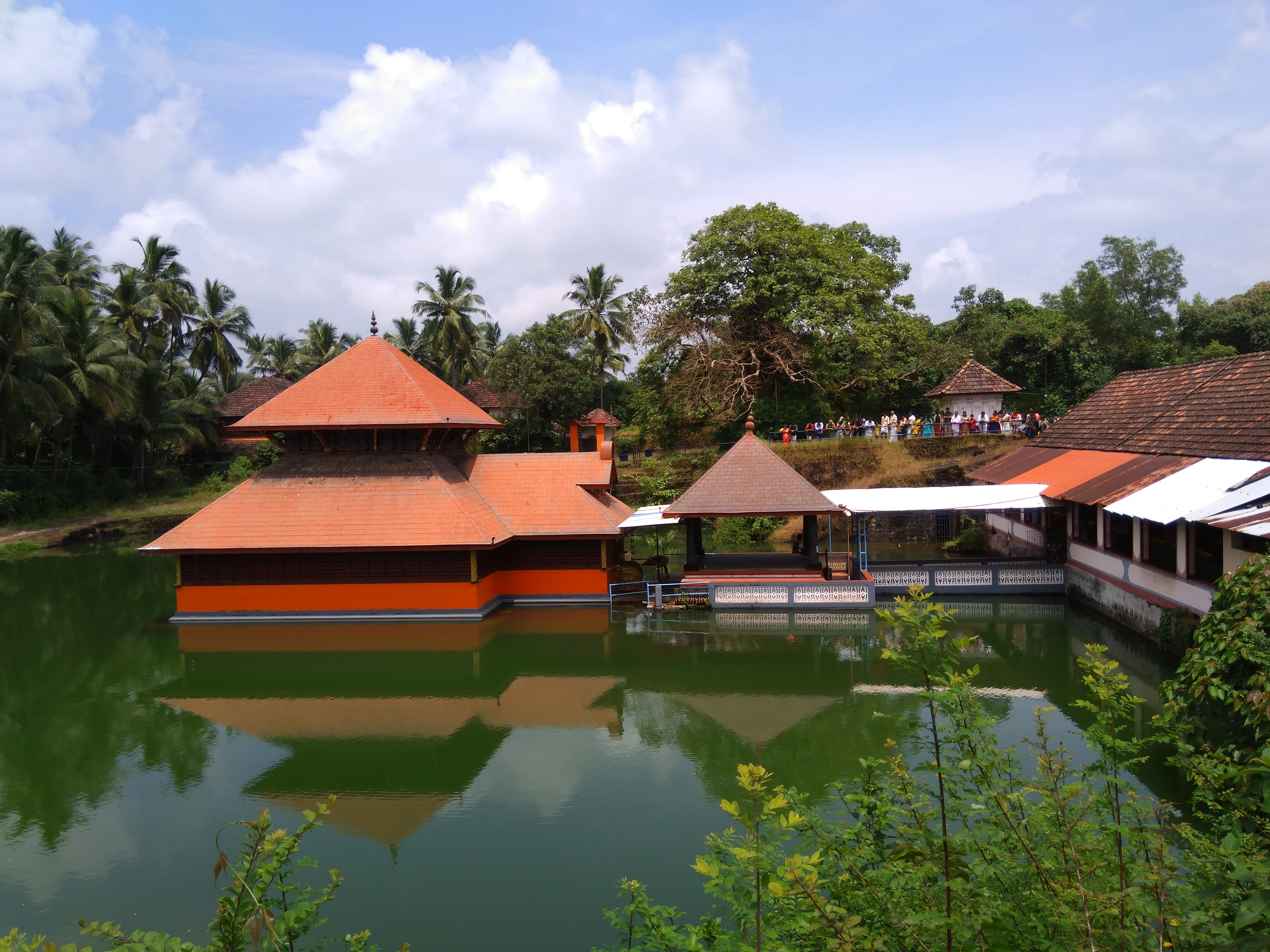
  Ananthapura Lake Temple – the only lake temple in Kerala
- Ananthapura Lake Temple, a temple to Vishnu.
- Ranipuram Hills - A Hill station of grassy hills near Panathady Town and linked to Kanhangad by Kanhangad-Panathur-Madikeri highway.
- Kottancheri Hills - Located near Malom, 45 km from Kanhangad Town.
- Arikady fort
- Edayilekkadu

== Pilgrim centres ==
- Madhur Ganapathy Temple
- Mallik Deenar Mosque, is located approximately 0.5 km from Kasaragod railway station.
- Bela Church, also known as Our Lady of Sorrows Church, is a Roman Catholic church located 14 km north of Kasaragod and 50 km south of Mangalore.
