= Kasaragod =

Municipal city in Kerala, India

- City
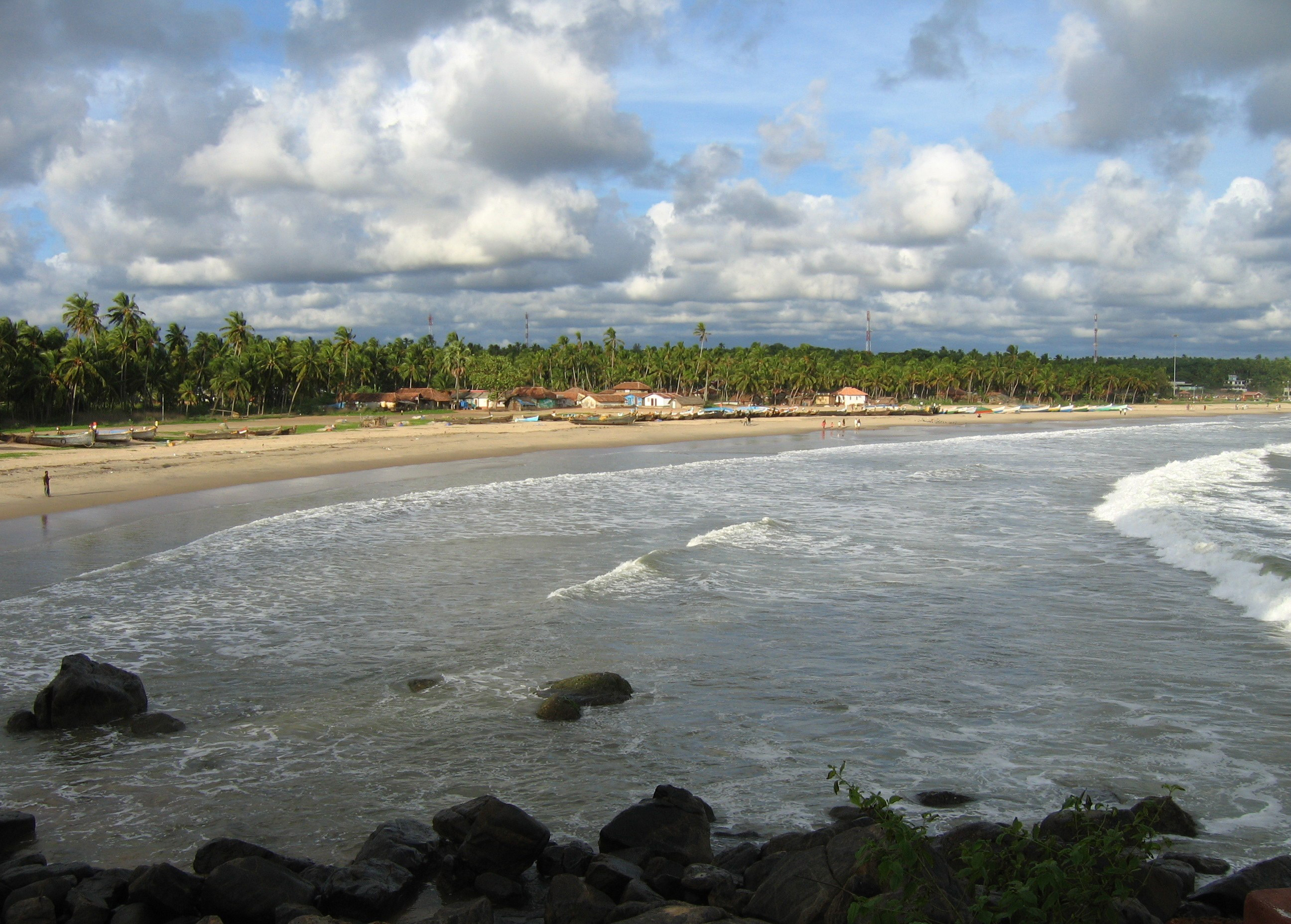
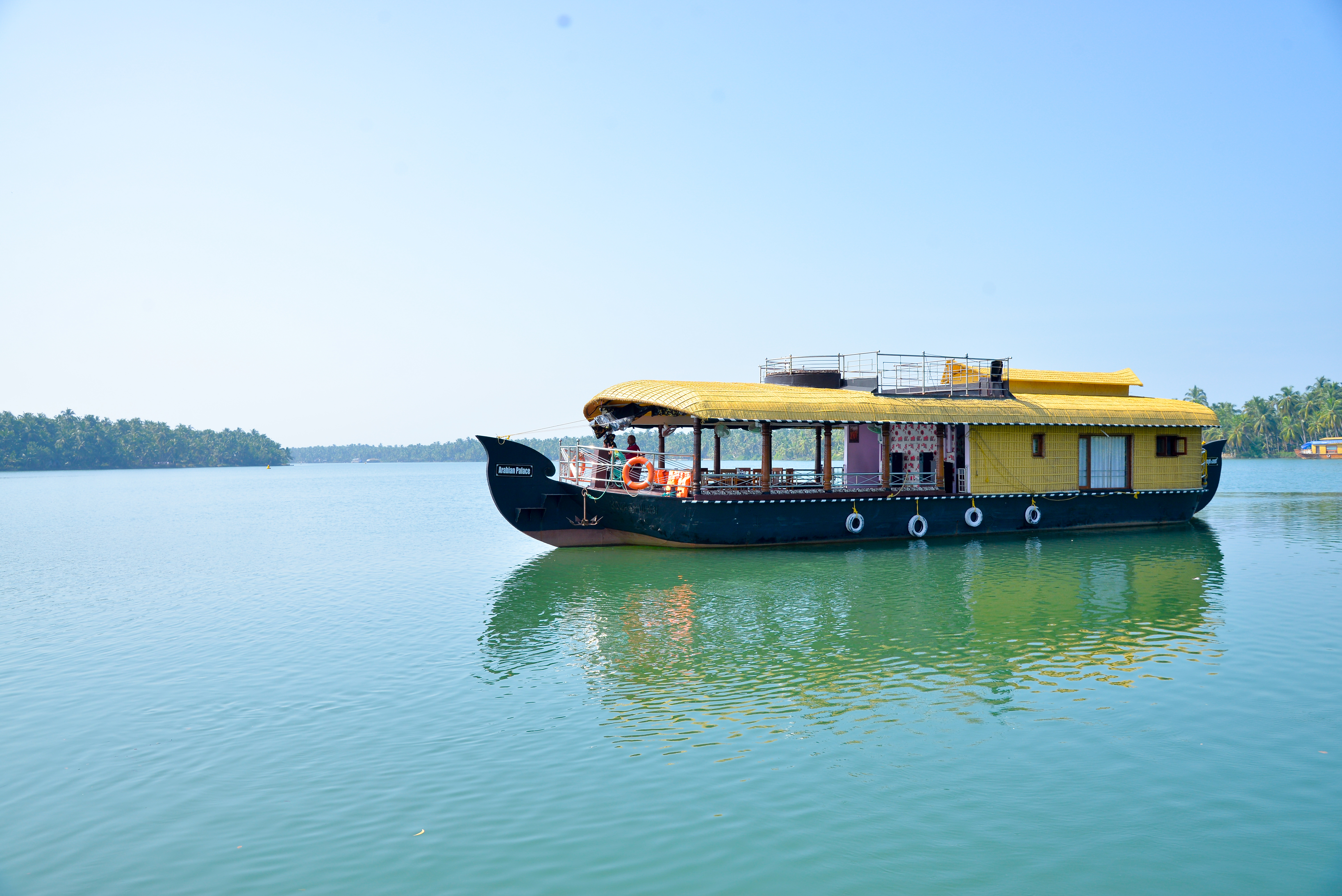
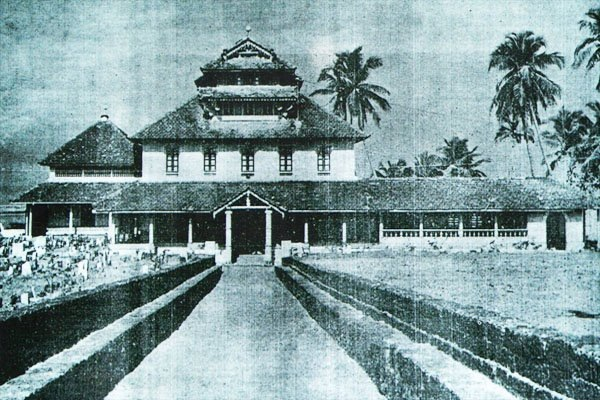
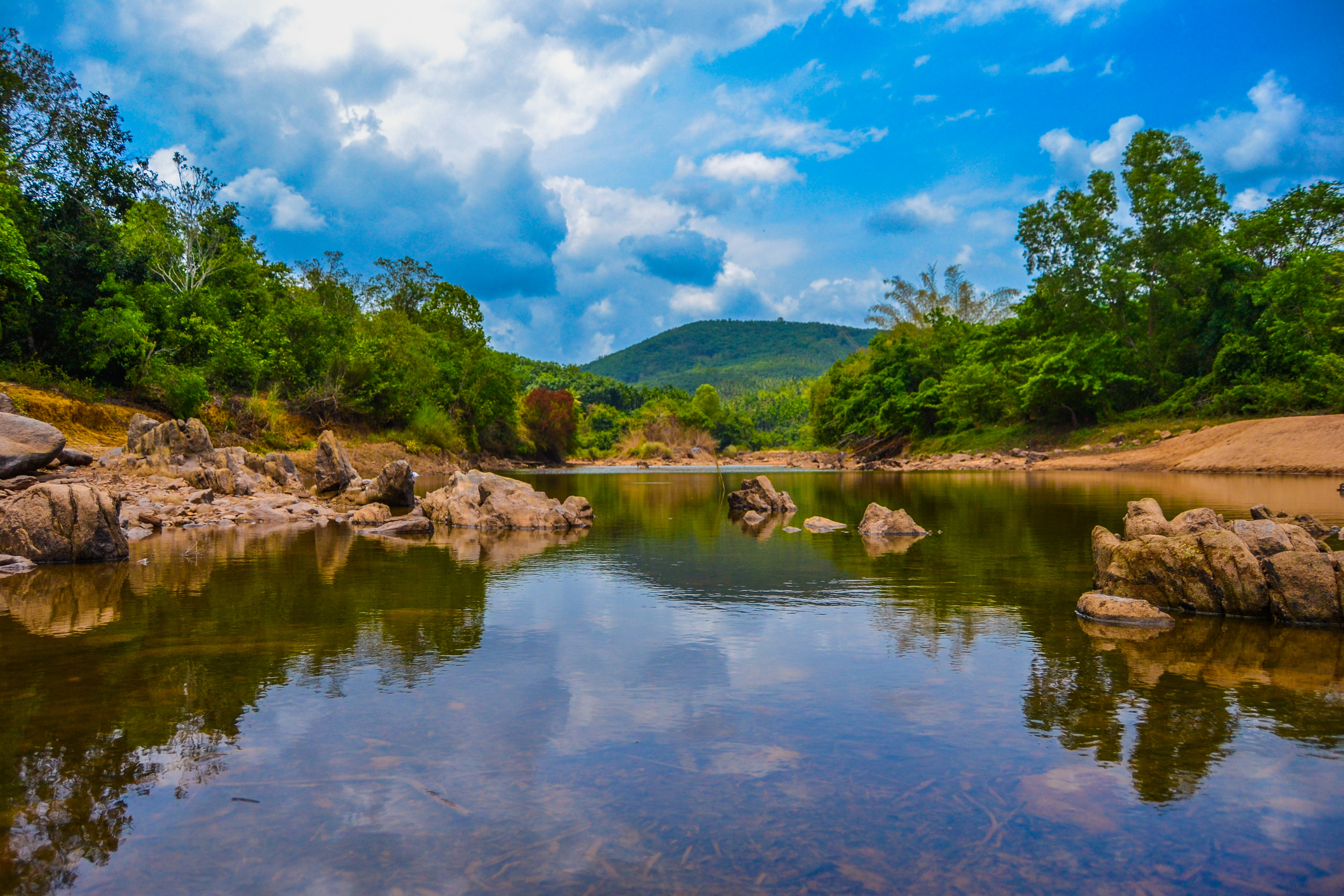
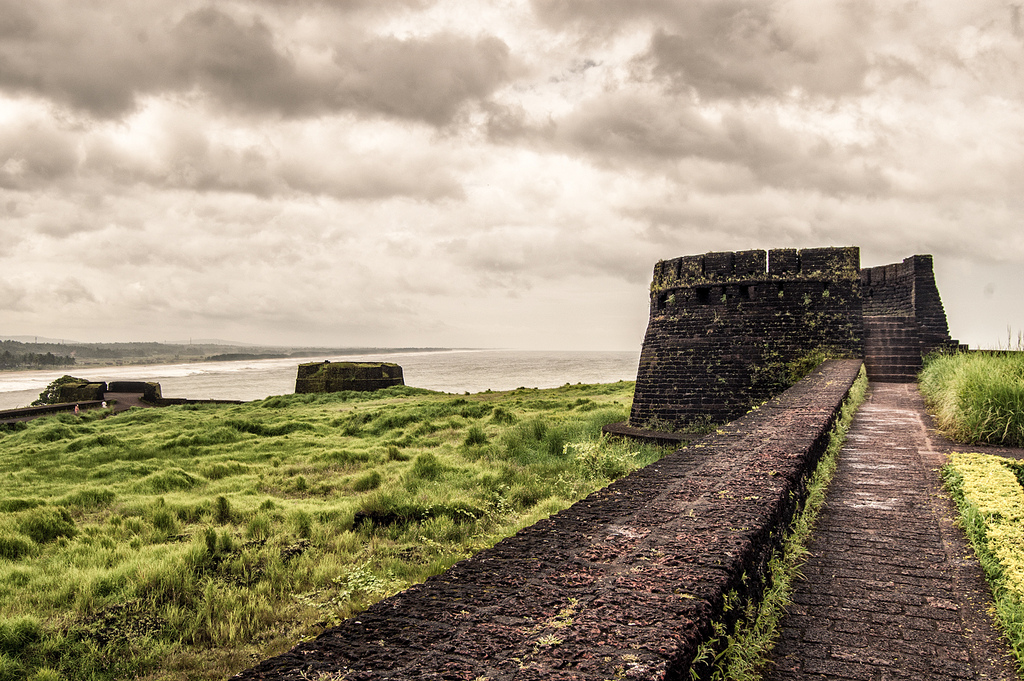
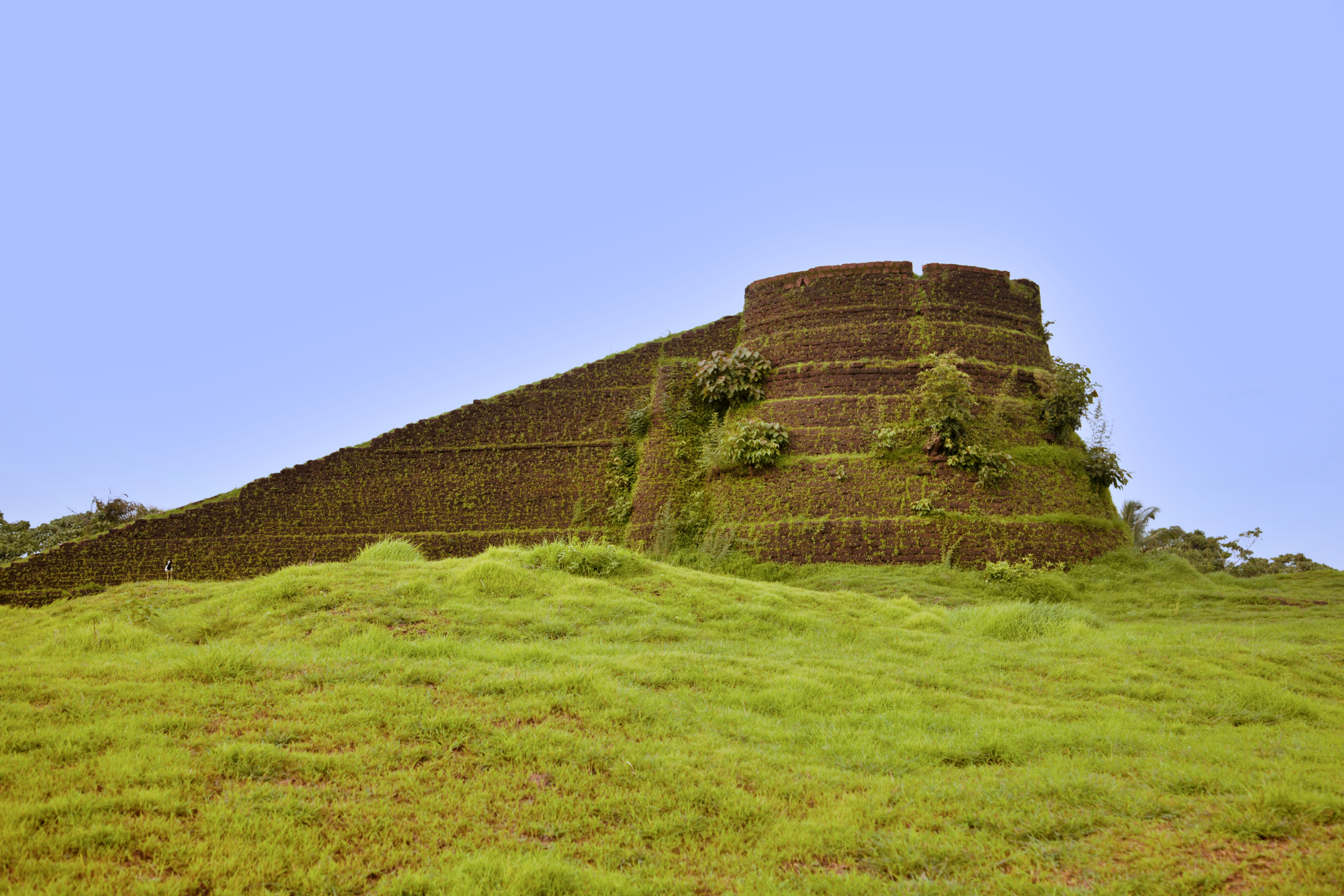
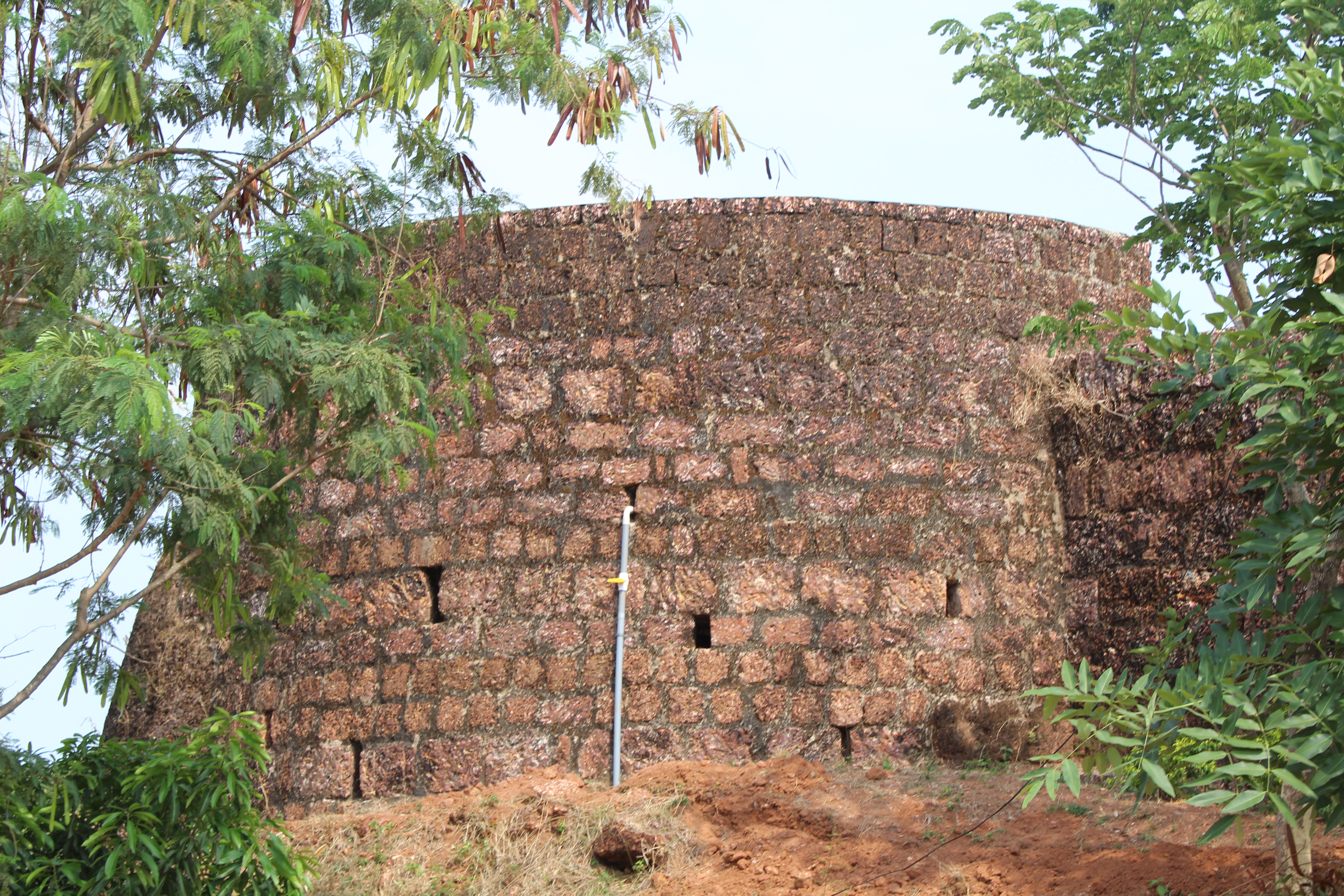
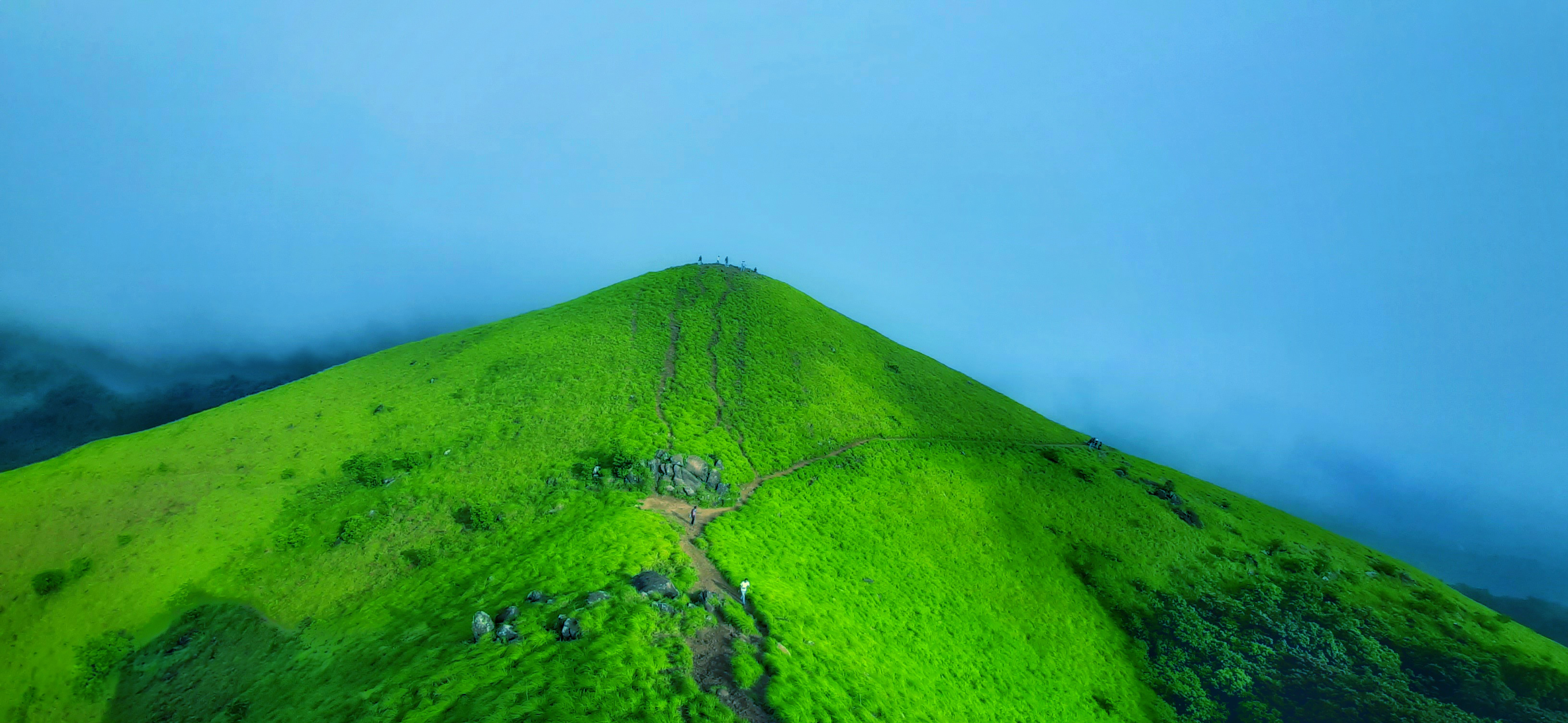
- Clockwise from top: Bekal beach, Chandragiri River, Chandragiri Fort, Ranipuram, Bekal Fort, Kavvayi Backwaters at Nileshwaram, Malik Dinar Mosque, and Arikady fort
- Nicknames: The Land of Seven Languages, The Land of God
- Interactive map of Kasaragod
- Coordinates: 12.5°N 75.0°E
- Country: India
- State: Kerala
- District: Kasaragod
- Municipality Established: 1966

Government
  - Type: Grade 1 Municipality
  - Body: Kasaragod Municipality
  - Chairperson: Shahina Salim (IUML)
  - Deputy Chairperson: K M Haneefa
  - MP: Rajmohan Unnithan
  - MLA: Kallatra Mahin

Area
  - City: 16.7 km^{2} (6.4 sq mi)
  - Metro: 93.3 km^{2} (36.0 sq mi)
- Elevation: 19 m (62 ft)

Population (2011)
  - City: 54,172
  - Density: 3,240/km^{2} (8,400/sq mi)
  - Metro: 192,856
- Time zone: UTC+5:30 (IST)
- PIN: 671121
- Telephone: +91 4994
- Vehicle registration: KL-14
- Official language: Malayalam; English
- Website: kasargod.nic.in

Kasaragod (Malayalam: [kaːsɐrɐɡoːɖɨ̆]) is a municipal town and the administrative headquarters of the Kasaragod district in the state of Kerala, India. Established in 1966, Kasaragod was the first municipal town in the district. It is the northernmost district of Kerala and is also known as Sapta Bhasha Sangama Bhumi ('The Land of Seven Languages').

Situated in the rich biodiversity of Western Ghats, it is known for the Chandragiri and Bekal Fort, Chandragiri River, historic Kolathiri Rajas, natural environment of Ranipuram Hills and Kottancheri Hills, historical and religious sites like the Madiyan Kulom temple, Madhur Temple, Ananthapuram Lake Temple and Malik Deenar Mosque. The historic hill of Ezhimala is located on the southern portion of Kavvayi Backwaters of Nileshwaram.

Kasaragod is located 90 km north of Kannur city corporation and 50 km south of Mangalore. Kasaragod district has the maximum number of rivers in Kerala - 12. The town is located on the estuary where the Chandragiri River, which is also the longest river in the district, empties into the Arabian Sea. Kasaragod is home to several forts, including Arikady fort, Bekal Fort, Chandragiri Fort, and Hosdurg Fort. Bekal Fort is the largest and best preserved fort in Kerala. Talakaveri, which is home to Talakaveri Wildlife Sanctuary where the 805 km long Kaveri river originates, is located closer to Ranipuram on the Kerala-Karnataka border.

Robert Caldwell describes the extent of Malayalam in the 19th century as extending from Chandragiri (fort and river) in the north to Neyyar river beyond Thiruvananthapuram in the south and from Malabar Coast in the west to Western Ghats in the east besides the inhabited islands of Lakshadweep in the Arabian Sea. (Note: “Malayalam is spoken along the Malabar coast, on the western side of the Ghauts, or Malaya range of mountains, from the vicinity of Chandragiri (river and fort) near Mangalore, where it supersedes Canarese and Tuļu, to Trivandrum, where it begins to be superseded by Tamil. The people by whom this language is spoken in the native states of Travancore and Cochin, and in the East India Company's districts of Malabar and Canara, may be estimated at two and a half millions.” (Page 7) "Kottara: This is the name of a place in the country of the 'Aii', or ' Paralia ' (identical with South Travancore), which is called ‘Kottiara Metropolis' by Ptolemy, ' Cottora' by Pliny. Undoubtedly the town referred to is ‘Kôțţâra' or, as it is ordinarily spelled by Europeans, ‘ Kotaur,' the principal town in South Travancore, and now, as in the time of the Greeks, distinguished for its commerce. The name of the place is derived from ‘ Kôd-u, ' Tam., a line of circumvallation, a fortification, and “ ârú, ' a river. It is a rule in the Tamil and the Malayalam, that when a word like ‘Kôd is the first member of a compound, the final ' ' must be doubled for the purpose of giving the word the force of an adjective : it is another rule that sonants when doubled become surds. Consequently the compound ‘kôd- ara' becomes by rule 'kôţt-âra' . It is interesting to perceive that in the time of the Greeks the same peculiar phonetic rules existed which are now in operation . It is also worth noticing that the Greek writers represent the last syllable of the name of the town, not as ' âru ,' but as 'âra . The Tamil has ' âru, ' the Malayalam 'ara ' At Kotaur, the dialectic peculiarities of the Malayalam language begin to supersede those of the Tamil; and this appears to have been the case even in the time of the Greeks." (Page 62-63))

== Etymology ==
Said to be from Kannada kāsara "Strychnos nux-vomica" and gōḍe "rampart". In Malayalam Kasaragod was known as kāññirakkōṭŭ (The land of kāññiram trees). kāññiram is Malayalam for Kasaraka trees (Kannada name) found in abundance here.

Kasaragod was under the Kumbla dynasty until the 16th century, which was vassal to the kingdom of Kolathunadu based at Kannur. Kannada kingdoms focused on the port and surroundings in the 16th century CE.

== History ==
=== Ancient era ===
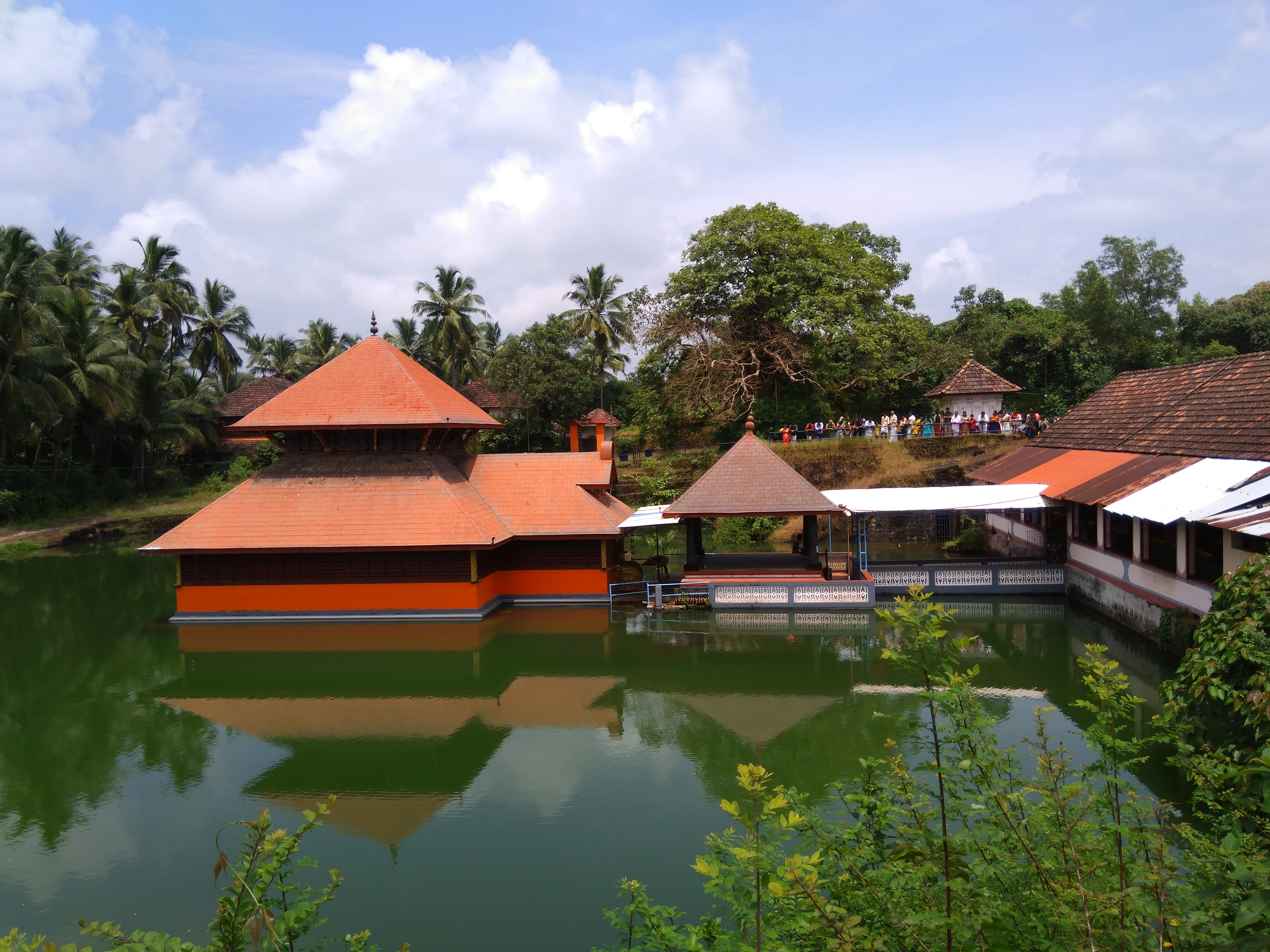
Ananthapadmanabhaswamy temple at Ananthapura, Kumbla

The ancient Tamil works of the Sangam Age record that the area covering the district was part of Puzhinadu which consists of the coastal belt from Kozhikode to Mangalore. Politically the area was part of the Ezhimala Kingdom with its capital at Ezhimala in present-day Kannur district. The most famous king of Ezhimala was Nannan whose kingdom extended up to Gudalur and northern parts of Coimbatore. Poozhinad, along with Karkanad which included the eastern regions of Ezhimala dynasty (Wayanad-Gudalur region with some portions of Kodagu), had its capital at Ezhimala. The Mooshaka kings were considered descendants of Nannan. By the 14th century, Mooshaka Kingdom was known as Kolathirinad and the rulers as Kolathiris. The Kolathunad Kingdom at the peak of its power reportedly extended from Netravati River (Mangalore) in the north to Korapuzha (Kozhikode) in the south with Arabian Sea on the west and Kodagu hills on the eastern boundary, also including the isolated islands of Lakshadweep in Arabian Sea.

=== Medieval era ===
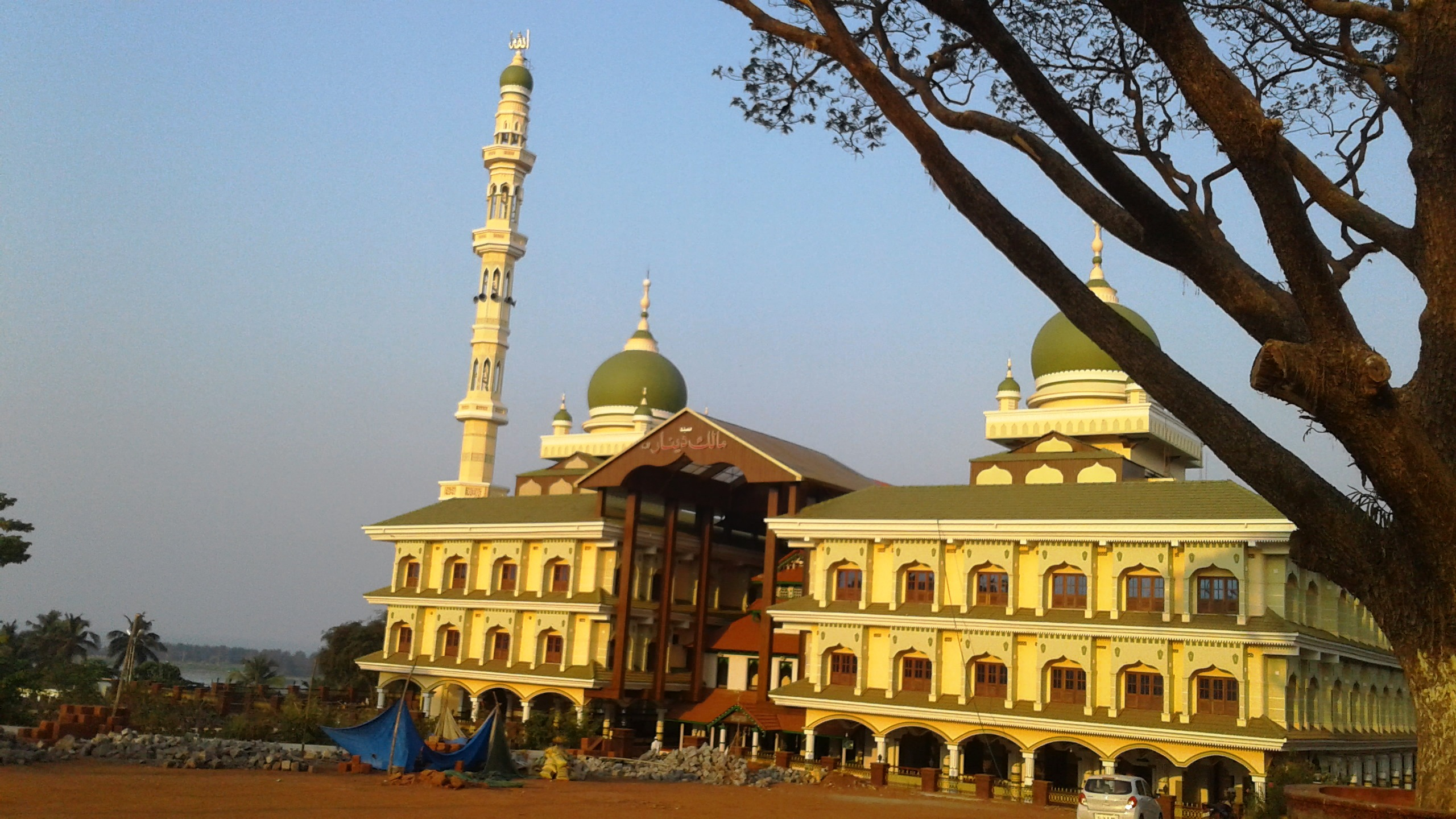
Malik Dinar Mosque, Thalangara, Kasaragod, is one of the oldest mosques in India.

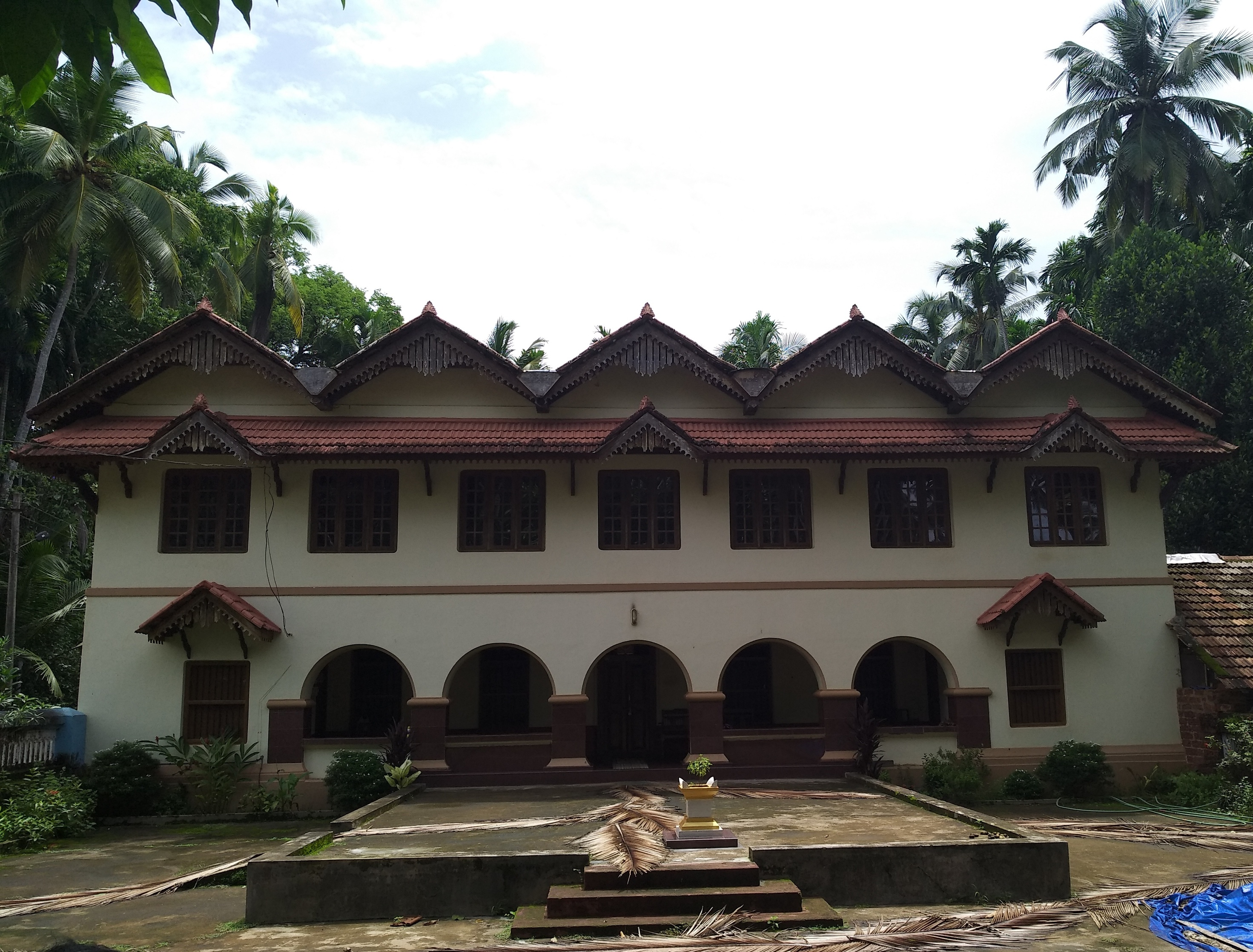
Maipady palace

Kasaragod, about 50 km south of Mangalore city, was an important centre of trade in earlier times. Ramacharitam, probably the oldest literary work written in Old Malayalam, which dates back to the 12th century CE, is thought to have written in Kasaragod district as its manuscripts were discovered from Nileshwaram and the poem mentions about Ananthapura Lake Temple in Kumbla in detail. Kasaragod was known to the Arabs by the name Harkwillia. The Malik Dinar Mosque in Kasaragod town is one of the oldest Masjids in the Indian subcontinent. According to Qissat Shakarwati Farmad, the Masjids at Kodungallur, Kollam, Madayi, Barkur, Mangalore, Kasaragod, Kannur, Dharmadam, Panthalayini, and Chaliyam, were built during the era of Malik Dinar, and they are among the oldest Masjids in the Indian subcontinent. It is believed that Malik Dinar died at Thalangara in Kasaragod town. Many Arab travelers visiting Kerala between the 9th and the 14th centuries visited Kasaragod, being an important trade centre then. Duarte Barbosa, a Portuguese traveler who visited Kumbla, near Kasaragod Town in 1514 recorded that rice being exported for coir to Maldives. According to Barbosa, the people in the southwestern Malabar coast of India from Kumbla in the north to Kanyakumari in the south spoke a unique language, which they called as "Maliama" (Malayalam).

Until the 16th century CE, Kasaragod town was known by the name Kanhirakode (may be by the meaning, 'the land of Kanhira trees') in Malayalam. The Kumbla dynasty, who swayed over the land of southern Tulu Nadu wedged between Chandragiri River and Netravati River (including present-day taluks of Manjeshwar and Kasaragod) from Maipady Palace at Kumbla, had also been vassals to the Kolathunadu kingdom of North Malabar, before the Carnatic conquests of Vijayanagara Empire. The Kumbla dynasty had a mixed lineage of Malayali Nairs and Tuluva Brahmins. They also claimed their origin from Cheraman Perumals of Kerala. Francis Buchanan-Hamilton states that the customs of Kumbla dynasty were similar to those of the contemporary Malayali kings.

The Kolathiri Dominion emerged into ten independent principalities, i.e. Kadathanadu (Vadakara), Randathara or Poyanad (Dharmadom), Kottayam (Thalassery), Nileshwaram, Iruvazhinadu (Panoor), Kurumbranad etc., under separate royal chieftains due to the outcome of internal dissensions. Many portions of the present-day Hosdurg taluk (Kanhangad) and Vellarikundu were parts of the Nileshwaram dynasty, who were relatives to both Kolathunadu as well as Zamorin of Calicut, in the early medieval period. The areas north to the Chandragiri river (present-day Taluks of Manjeshwaram and Kasaragod) were ruled by the Kumbala dynasty.

The Chandragiri Fort is built on the southern bank of the estuary of Chandragiri River, just opposite to Kasaragod town. The Bekal Fort at Bekal, Pallikkara, which is situated midway between Kasaragod and Kanhangad, and which is largest fort in Kerala, was built in 1650 by Shivappa Nayaka of Keladi.

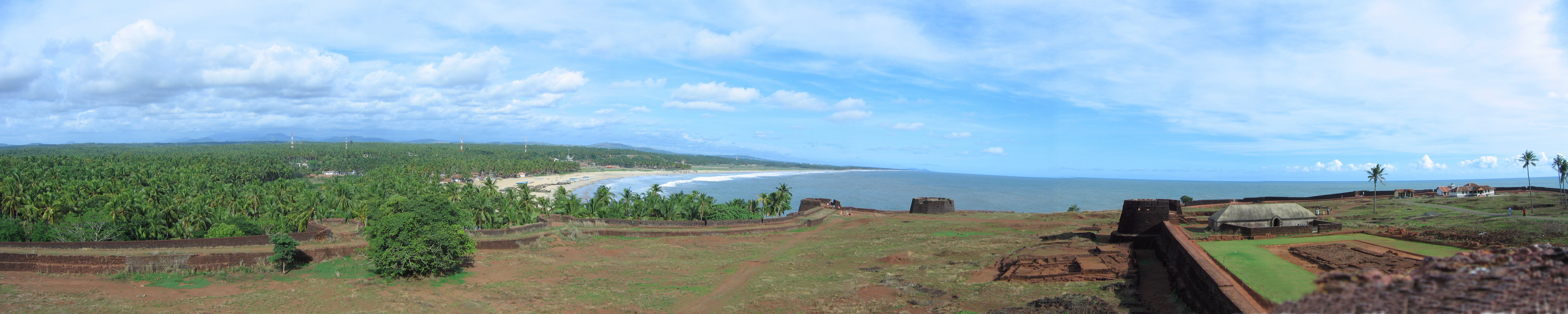
Panoramic view from inside Bekal Fort, the largest fort in Kerala

=== Colonial era ===
Sunset at Valiyaparamba beach

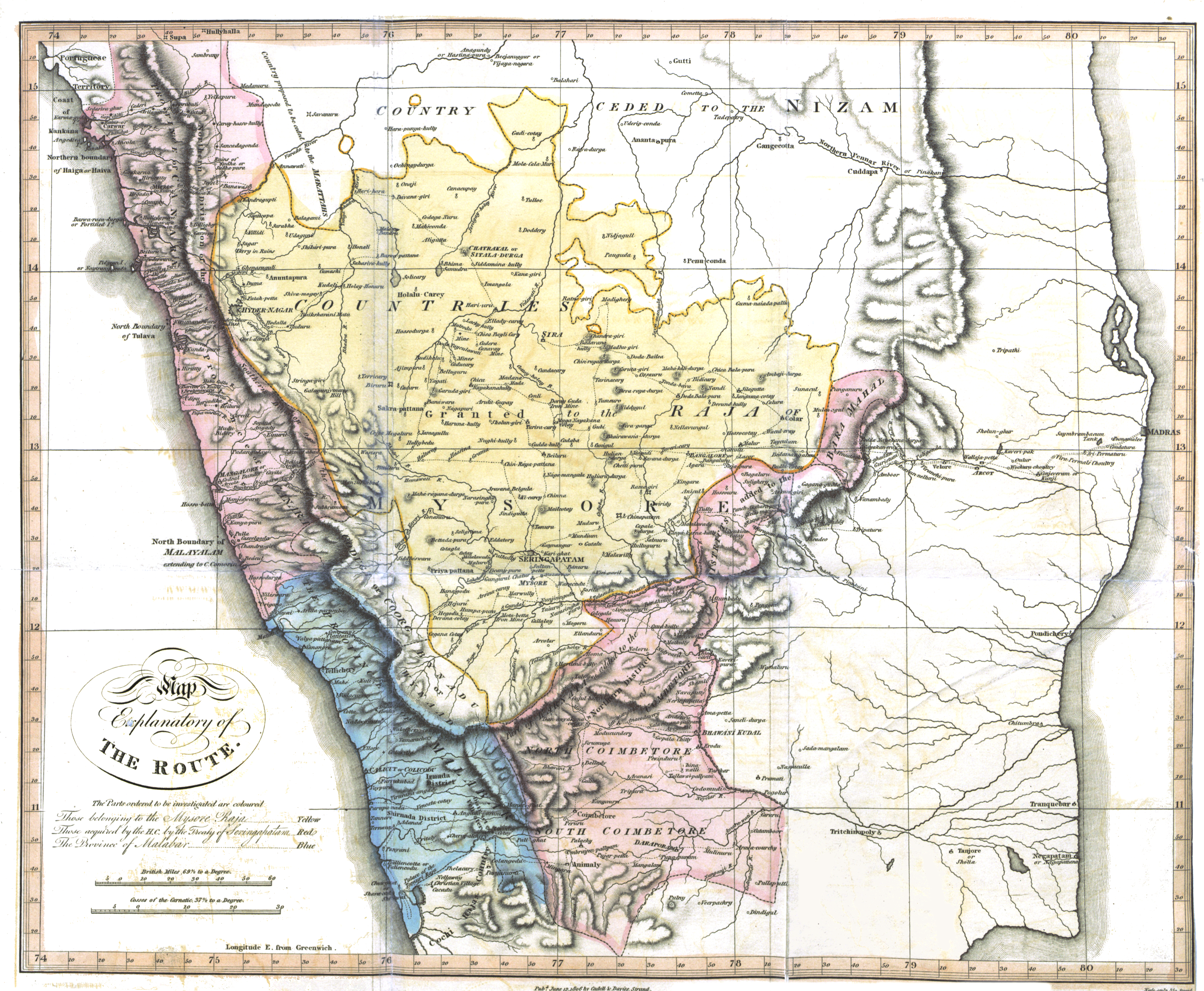
A map of Malabar District (Malayalam district) drawn by Francis Buchanan-Hamilton in 1807. A portion of Kasaragod taluk of erstwhile British South Canara district to the south of Payaswini/Chandragiri river was also included in Malayalam region (just above the blue shaded region).

Francis Buchanan, the family doctor of Arthur Wellesley, visited Kasaragod in 1800. In his travelogue, he recorded information on places like Athiraparambu, Kavvayi, Nileshwaram, Bekal, Chandragiri and Manjeshwar.

Hosdurg and Vellarikundu was part of Kolathunadu (south of Chandragiri river) and Kasaragod and Manjeshwaram was in the Tulu Nadu region (north of Chandragiri river).

In 1763, Hyder Ali raided Bedanoor (Bidnur), the capital of the Ikkery Naiks. His son Tippu Sultan raided much of Malabar region in Kerala. As per the Treaty of Seringapatam of 1792, Tippu surrendered Malabar, except Kanara to the British. The British occupied Kanara only after the death of Tippu Sultan. it is said that Kinavoor Molom (Sree Dharma Shashtha Temple) is belonging to Karinthalam (one of 64 Brahmin villages in old Kerala). Initially South Canara was placed under the Bombay presidency. Later on 16 April 1862, South Canara was transferred to Madras Presidency and Kasaragod taluk was formed by replacing the erstwhile Bekal taluk. Kasaragod was the second-most populated Taluk in South Canara only after to Mangalore taluk, and also the second-largest Taluk.

=== Post-Independence ===
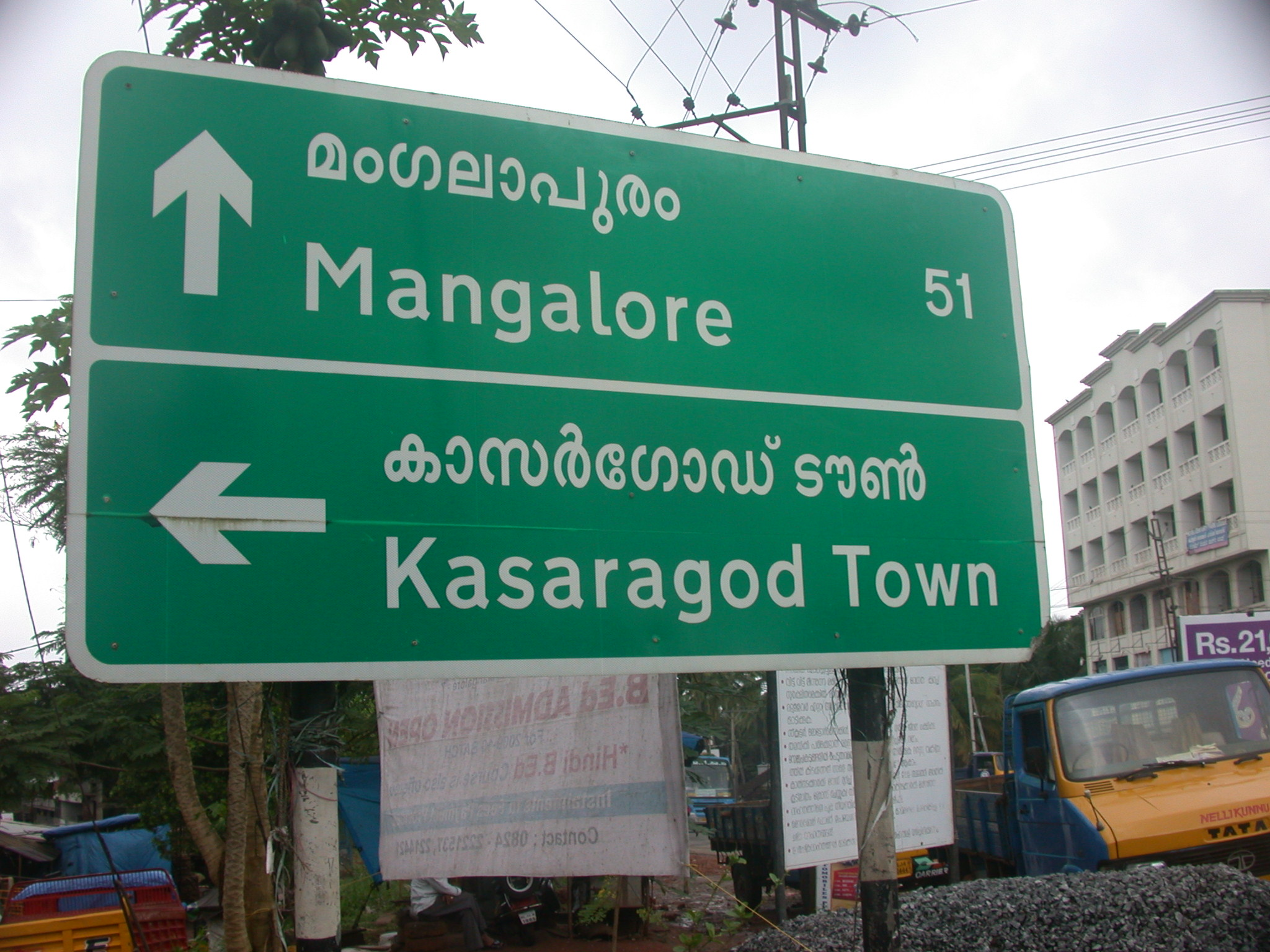
Road sign in Kasaragod town

Before the formation of Kerala, Kasaragod was a part of South Canara district of erstwhile Madras Presidency. However, in the 19th century CE, Kasaragod Taluk witnessed many struggles to separate the region from South Canara and to merge it with the Malabar District as it was the only Malayalam-majority region in South Canara. Kasaragod became a part of Kannur district of Kerala following the reorganization of states and the formation of Kerala on 1 November 1956. Later Kasaragod was divided into two taluks for the ease of administration - Kasaragod and Hosdurg. Kasaragod was declared a district in 1984. The inclusion of Kasaragod with Kerala has been a contentious issue as there is a sizeable population that speaks Tulu and Kannada. At the time of 1951 Census of India, only 72.0% of the district's population chose their mother tongue as Malayalam. 14.2% chose Tulu and 6.3% chose Kannada. But it is noted that as per the 2011 census report only 8.8% and 4.2% of the total population in the district speak Tulu and Kannada respectively as their mother tongue. In 2012, the Second Oommen Chandy ministry appointed a commission under the leadership the former Chief Secretary P. Prabhakaran to study about the backwardness and issues faced by this northernmost district of Kerala and to draw up special package for the district. In 2013, two more Taluks, namely Manjeshwaram and Vellarikundu were formed in the district.

== Geography ==
=== Climate ===
Kasaragod experiences a tropical monsoon climate under the Köppen climate classification. It receives a generous 3,825 mm (150.6 in) of rain annually.

Climate data for Kasaragod, Kerala
| Month | Jan | Feb | Mar | Apr | May | Jun | Jul | Aug | Sep | Oct | Nov | Dec | Year |
|---|---|---|---|---|---|---|---|---|---|---|---|---|---|
| Mean daily maximum °C (°F) | 31.4 (88.5) | 31.5 (88.7) | 32.2 (90.0) | 32.7 (90.9) | 32.2 (90.0) | 29.3 (84.7) | 28.2 (82.8) | 28.4 (83.1) | 28.8 (83.8) | 30.0 (86.0) | 31.0 (87.8) | 31.5 (88.7) | 30.6 (87.1) |
| Mean daily minimum °C (°F) | 21.7 (71.1) | 22.8 (73.0) | 24.3 (75.7) | 25.9 (78.6) | 25.7 (78.3) | 23.9 (75.0) | 23.4 (74.1) | 23.6 (74.5) | 23.5 (74.3) | 23.8 (74.8) | 23.1 (73.6) | 22.0 (71.6) | 23.6 (74.6) |
| Average precipitation mm (inches) | 1 (0.0) | 1 (0.0) | 5 (0.2) | 55 (2.2) | 262 (10.3) | 1,002 (39.4) | 1,190 (46.9) | 647 (25.5) | 338 (13.3) | 229 (9.0) | 77 (3.0) | 18 (0.7) | 3,825 (150.5) |
Source: Climate-Data.org

=== Rivers ===
Kasaragod has the maximum number of rivers in Kerala - 12. All of them are west-flowing rivers. The longest of them is Chandragiri River (105 km long). The Kasaragod town is located on the estuary of Chandragiri river. It empties into the Arabian Sea at Thalangara. The Chandragiri Fort is built on its bank. The river originates at Pattimala in Kodagu (Coorg). The smallest river of Kerala is also in the district.

Rivers of Kasaragod
| River | | Origin | Length (km) | |
| River | | Origin | Total | Navigable |
| 1 | Manjeshwar River | Kadandur hills | 16 | 3 |
| 2 | Uppala River | Kudipadi hills, Veerakamba | 50 | N/A |
| 3 | Shiriya River | Kanakad hills, Anegundi Reserve Forest | 61 | 5 |
| 4 | Kumbla River | Yedanad | 11 | 3 |
| 5 | Mogral River | Kanlur, Karadka Reserve Forest | 34 | N/A |
| 6 | Chandragiri River | Patti forest, Talakaveri Wildlife Sanctuary | 105 | 13 |
| 7 | Kalnad River | Chettianchal | 8 | N/A |
| 8 | Bekal River | Kaniyadka | 11 | N/A |
| 9 | Chittari River | Kundiya | 25 | N/A |
| 10 | Neeleshwaram River (Thejaswini River) | Kinanoor, Talakaveri Wildlife Sanctuary | 47 | 11 |
| 11 | Kariangode River | Padinalkad, Coorg hills | 64 | 24 |
| 12 | Kavvayi River | Cheemeni | 23 | 10 |

== Science and research ==
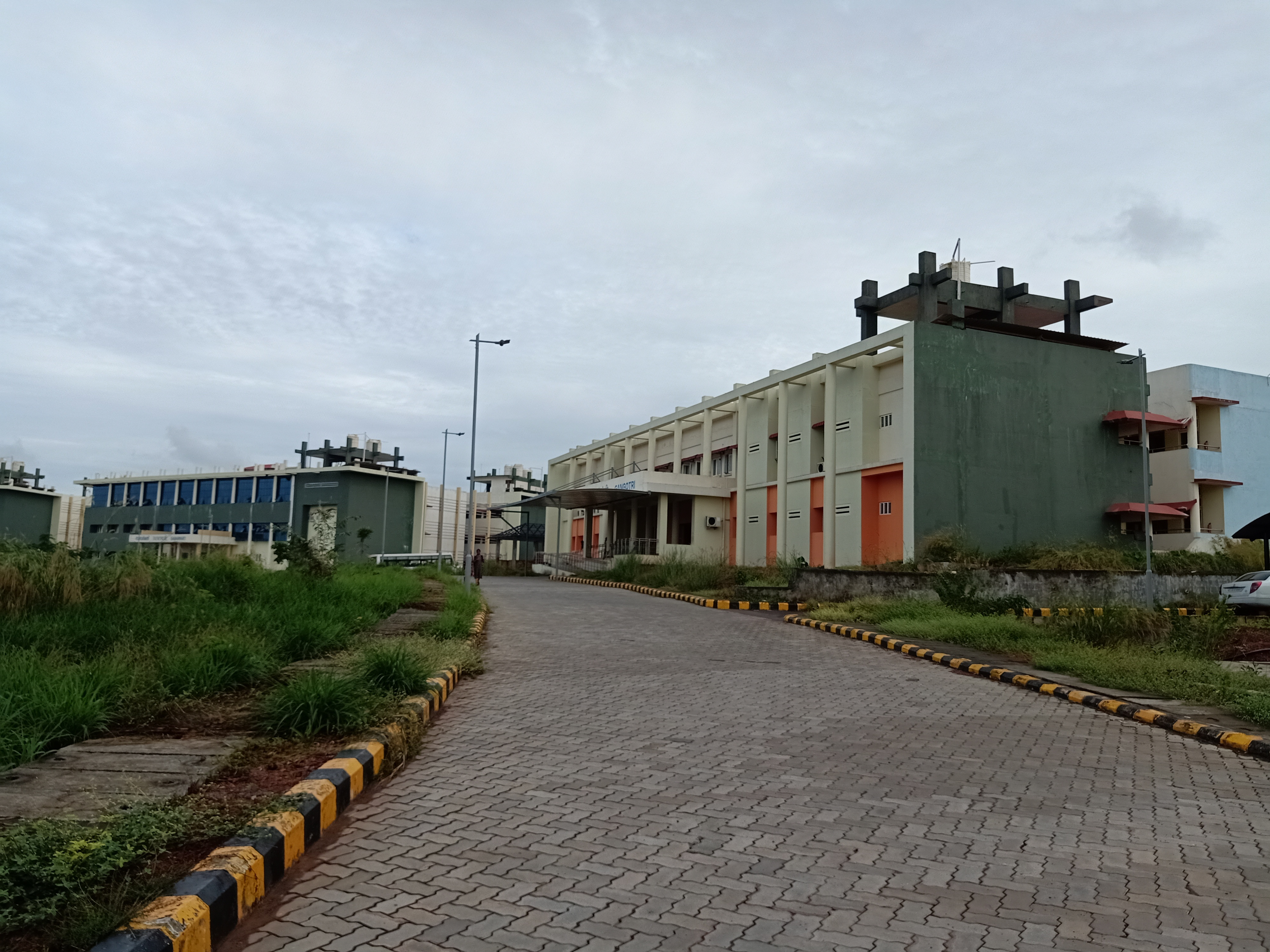
The Central University of Kerala is situated in the district.

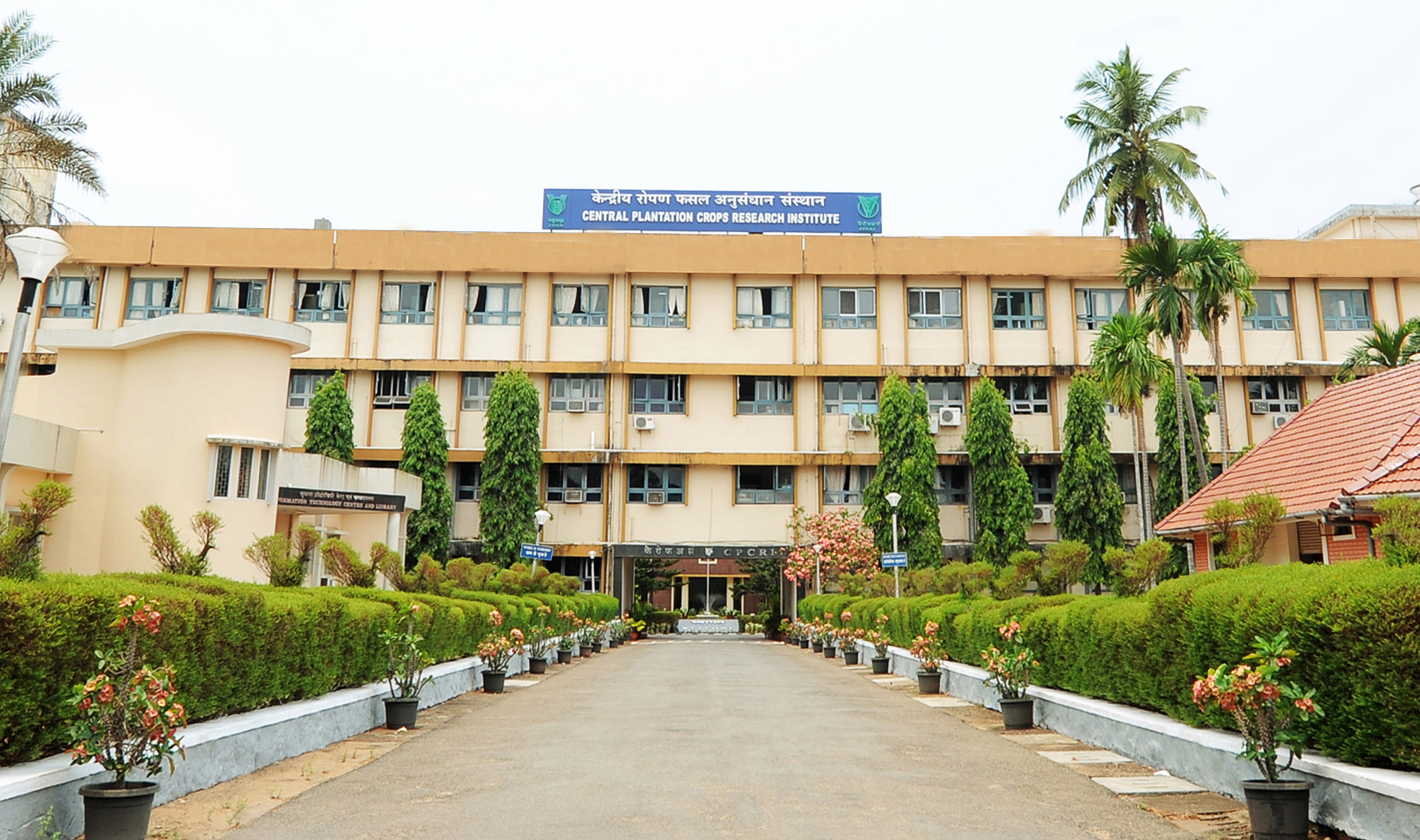
The Central Plantation Crops Research Institute at Kasaragod was established in 1916.

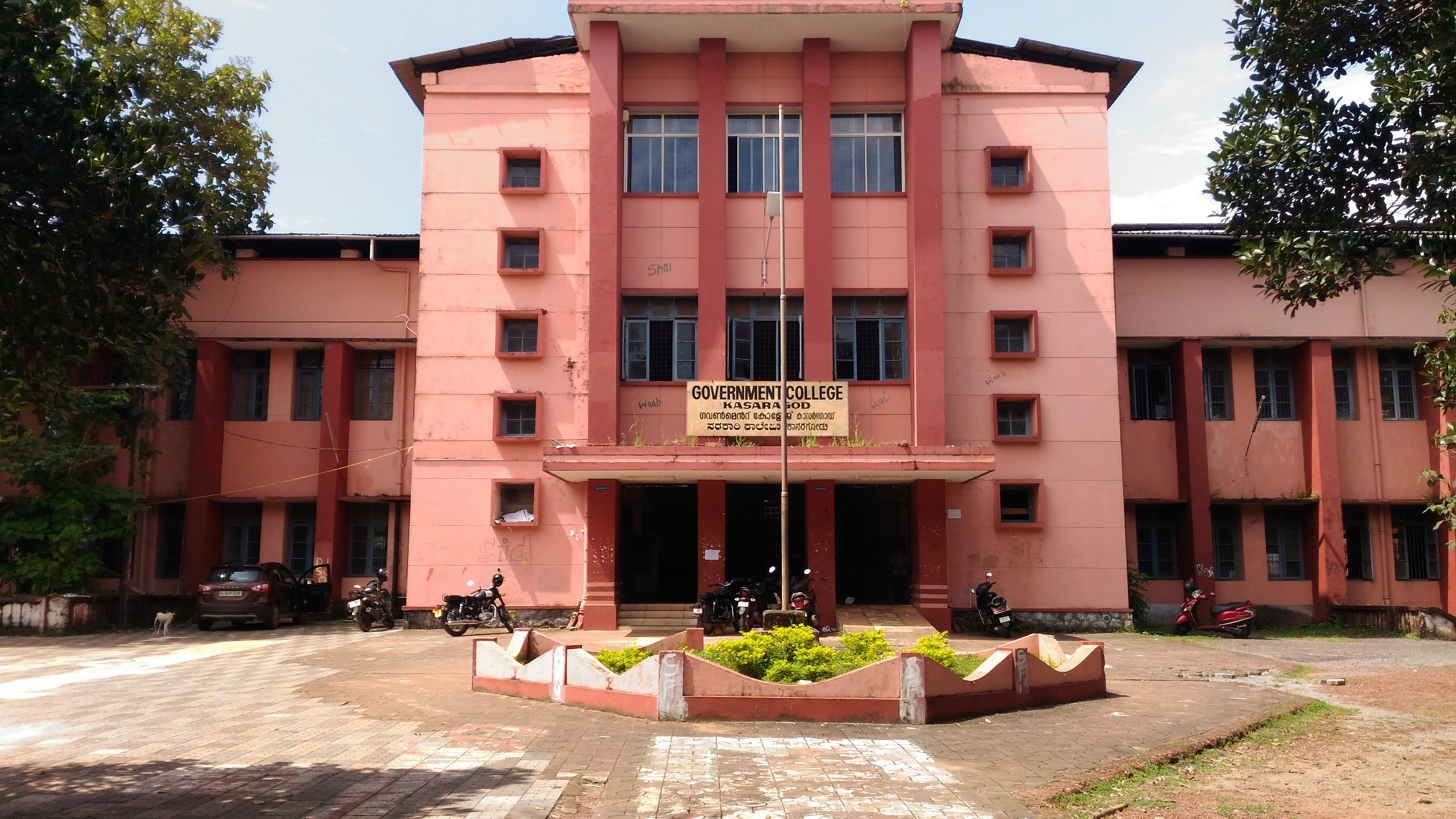
The Government College Kasaragod was established in 1957.

Kasaragod district comes under the jurisdiction of Kannur University. Kasaragod is home to the Central Plantation Crops Research Institute, originally established in 1916 as the Coconut Research Station. It is part of India's National Agricultural Research System under the Indian Council of Agricultural Research. According to the institute, Kerala "lies in the heart of the major coconut growing areas of the country." It is also home to the Indian Society for Plantation Crops, which publishes the Journal of Plantation Crops and holds symposiums on the subject. The Central University of Kerala is also located in Kasaragod(Periya hills).

- The Central Plantation Crops Research Institute at Kasaragod was established in 1916.
- Government College Kasaragod was established in 1957.
- The Central University of Kerala was established in 2009.
- Malik Deenar Institute of Management Studies is located at Seethamgoly, Kasaragod.
- Lal Bahadur Shastry college of engineering, Kasaragod, was established in 1993.
- Khansa Women's College For Advanced Studies, Kasaragod
- Jamia Sa Adiya Arts and Science College, Kasaragod
- Sharaf Arts & Science College, Padanna
- Zainab Memorial B.Ed. Centre, Kasaragod
- Peoples Arts & Science College, Munnad, Kasaragod
- Co-operative Arts & Science College, Badiadka, Kasaragod
- St. Gregorios College of Engineering, Perla, Kasaragod

== Transport ==
Kasaragod railway station lies on Mangalore-Shoranur railway line in Palakkad railway division.

The National Highway 66 which connects the western coast of India from Mumbai to Kanyakumari passes through coastal area of the district connecting the major coastal towns of Manjeshwar, Uppala, Kumbla, Kasaragod, Udma, Bekal, Kanhangad, Nileshwaram, and Thrikaripur. It enters the district at Thalappady and goes out through Payyanur. There are State highways starting/ending at Kasaragod and Kanhangad. Total length of Major District Road (MDR) of Kasaragod is around 1460 km and it accounts for around 11.2 km of MDR for every 10,000 people in the district. The Kerala State Road Transport Corporation (KSRTC) has stations to operate its service in the district. The railway goes through coastal area. Kasaragod railway station lies in Palakkad railway division of southern zone on Mangalore-Shoranur line. Kasaragod district is home to three of the 13 minor ports in Kerala - Manjeshwar, Kasaragod, and Nileshwaram. The nearest international airports are situated at Mangalore (65 km away) and Kannur (110 km away).

== Demographics ==
Religions in Kasaragod Town (2011)
1. Islam (54.6%)
2. Hinduism (43.6%)
3. Christianity (1.58%)
4. Other (0.22%)

As of 2011 Census, Kasaragod municipality had a population of 54,172 which constitutes 26,319 males and 27,853 females. Kasaragod municipality spreads over an area of 16.69 km^{2} (6.44 sq mi) with 10,202 families residing in it. The municipality is divided into 35 wards for which elections are held every 5 years. The female sex ratio was 1058 against state average of 1084. Population in the age group 0-6 was 7,234 (13.4%) where 3,716 are males and 3,518 are females. The literacy rate of Kasaragod town was 94.76% higher than state average of 94%. Male literacy stands at 96.5% and female literacy was 93.1%.

Languages in Kasaragod taluk
| Language | Speakers |
| Malayalam | 70.5% |
| Tulu | 16.2% |
| Kannada | 6.4% |
| Marathi | 2.7% |
| Konkani | 2.3% |
| Others | 1.9% |
Distribution of languages Source: 2011 Census

== Politics ==
Kasaragod acts as the administrative headquarters of Kasaragod district.

The current Municipal Chairman of Kasaragod municipality is Adv. V. M. Muneer of IUML and the deputy chairperson is Shamseeda Feroz.

The major political parties are Indian Union Muslim League, CPI(M), INC, CPI, and BJP. North Kasaragod is dominated by IUML which is followed by BJP, and the south is dominated by CPI(M). N. A. Nellikkunnu is the present Member of Legislative Assembly, from Kasaragod Assembly Constituency. It is a part of Kasaragod (Lok Sabha constituency). Indian National Congress (INC) member Rajmohan Unnithan is the present MP from Kasaragod (2019 elections).

Kannada has linguistic minority status in the Manjeshwaram taluk of the district.

== Backwardness ==
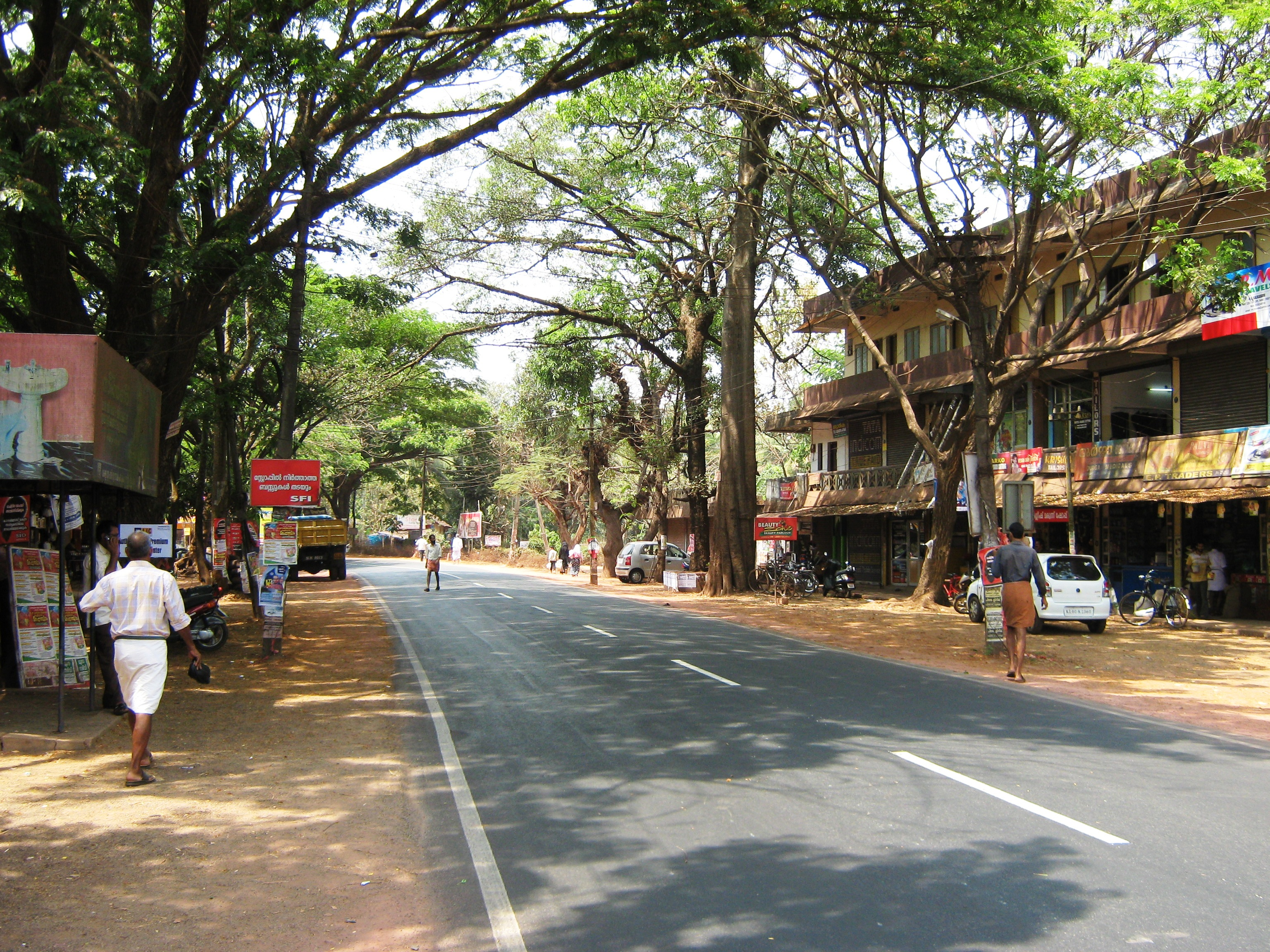
Thrikaripur town

Kasaragod district is the northernmost district of Kerala, which is much away from Thiruvananthapuram, the state headquarters, which is located in the southernmost tip of state. Manjeshwaram town is located about 600 km north of the state headquarters Thiruvananthapuram, about 30 km south of Mangalore, about 350 km west of Bangalore, the headquarters of the neighbouring state Karnataka, and about 950 km south of Mumbai city. In 2012, the Second Oommen Chandy ministry appointed a commission under the leadership of the former Chief Secretary P. Prabhakaran to study about the backwardness and issues faced by this northernmost district of Kerala and to draw up a special package for the district. In 2013, two more Taluks, namely Manjeshwaram and Vellarikundu were formed in the district. Before this, the district had only two taluks. The decision to implement a gas-based power plant at Cheemeni was taken by the second Chandy government. A government medical college was allowed for Kasaragod district, as a part of the government's new policy to establish at ensure availability of at least one government medical college in all 14 districts of the state in 2013.

== Tourism ==
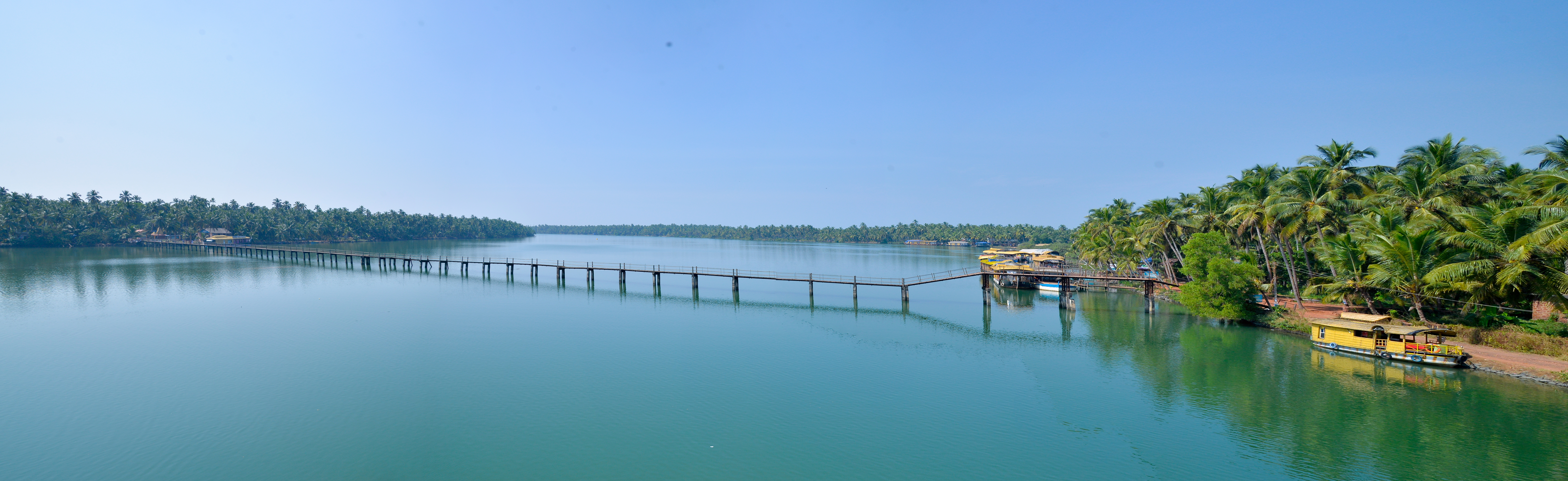
Kottappuram walking bridge, Nileshwar

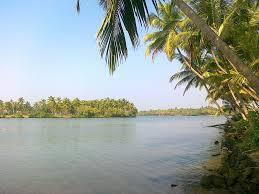
Edayilakkad island in Valiyaparamba

- Ananthapuram Lake Temple
- Arikady fort
- Bekal Fort
- Chandragiri Fort
- Edayilakkad Island
- Kanwatheertha beach
- Kappil beach
- Kottanchery hills
- Malik Dinar Mosque
- Mayipady palace
- Nileshwaram Estuary beach
- Our Lady of Sorrows Church
- Pallikkara beach
- Ranipuram Hill Station
- Valiyaparamba Island
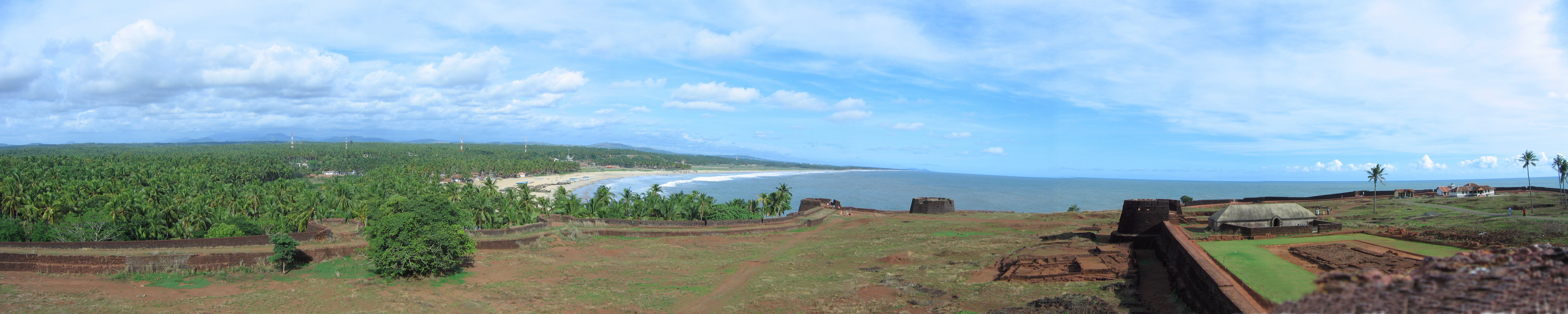
Panoramic view from inside Bekal Fort

== Notable people ==
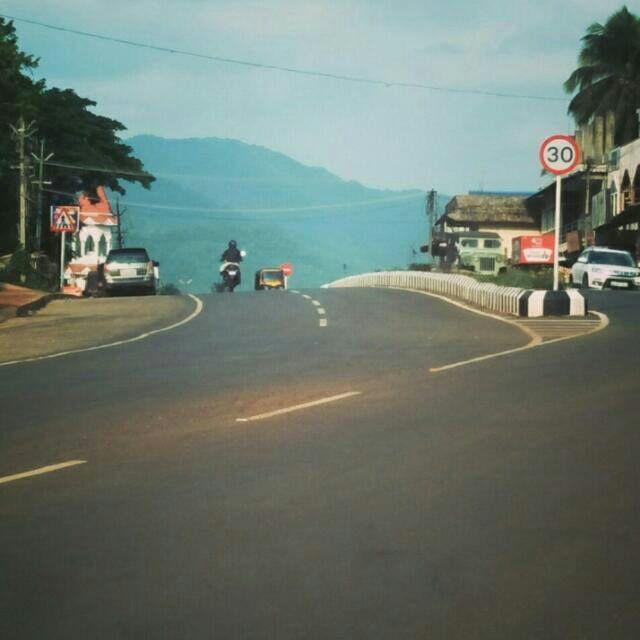
Panathur is an important hilly town in the district (closer to Western Ghats).

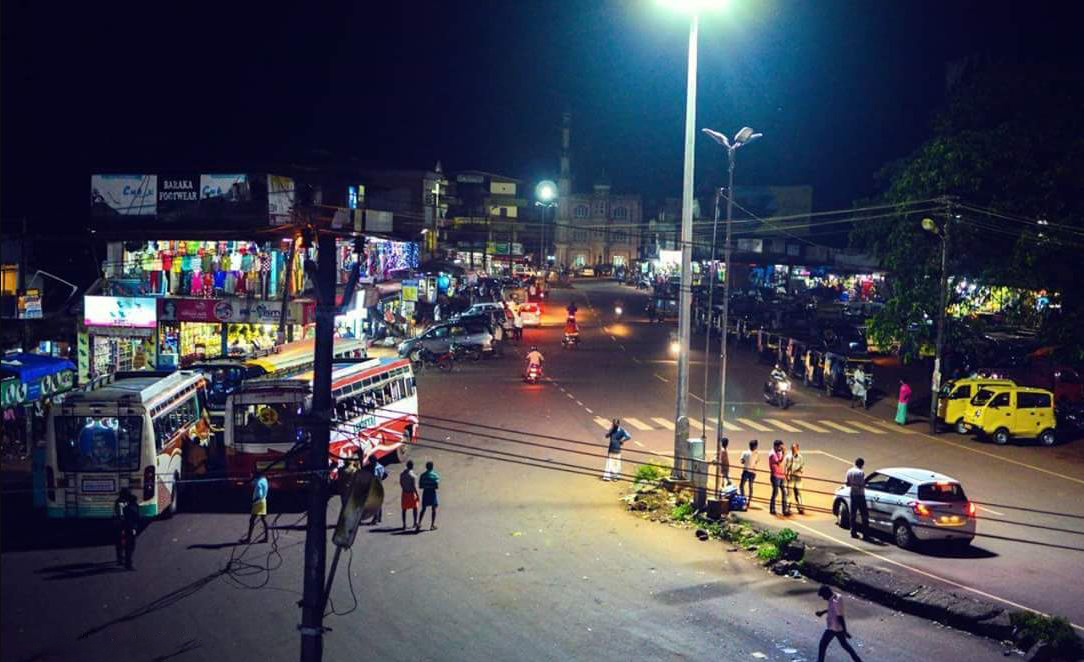
Badiyadka town at night

- Ambikasuthan Mangad – Malayalam writer
- Anil Kumble – former Indian cricketer, coach, and commentator
- Arya – Indian actor
- Asif Kottayil – Indian footballer
- Bellikoth Raghunath Shenoy – Indian economist
- D. K. Chowta – Indian businessman
- E. Chandrasekharan – minister of Kerala
- K. K. Venugopal – Attorney General of India
- Kanayi Kunhiraman – Indian artist
- Kavya Madhavan – Indian actress
- Kayyar Kinhanna Rai – Indian Independence activist
- Mahima Nambiar – Indian actress
- Mirshad Michu – Indian football goalkeeper
- Mohammed Rafi – Indian footballer
- Mohammed Azharuddeen – Indian cricketer
- P. Kunhiraman Nair – Malayalam poet
- Pallathadka Pramoda Kumari – scientist
- Prakash Bare – actor
- Roopesh Shetty – actor in the Kannada, Tulu film industry, radio jockey in Mangalore, and model
- Santhosh Echikkanam – Malayalam short story writer
- Sara Aboobacker – Kannada writer
- Sathya – Indian actor
- Vysakh – Malayalam film director

== See also ==
- Kasaragod East
- Kuloor
- List of educational institutions in Kasaragod District
- List of tourist attractions in Kasaragod
