= Malik Dinar =

Islamic missionary (d. 748)

Mālik ibn Dīnār مالك بن دينار
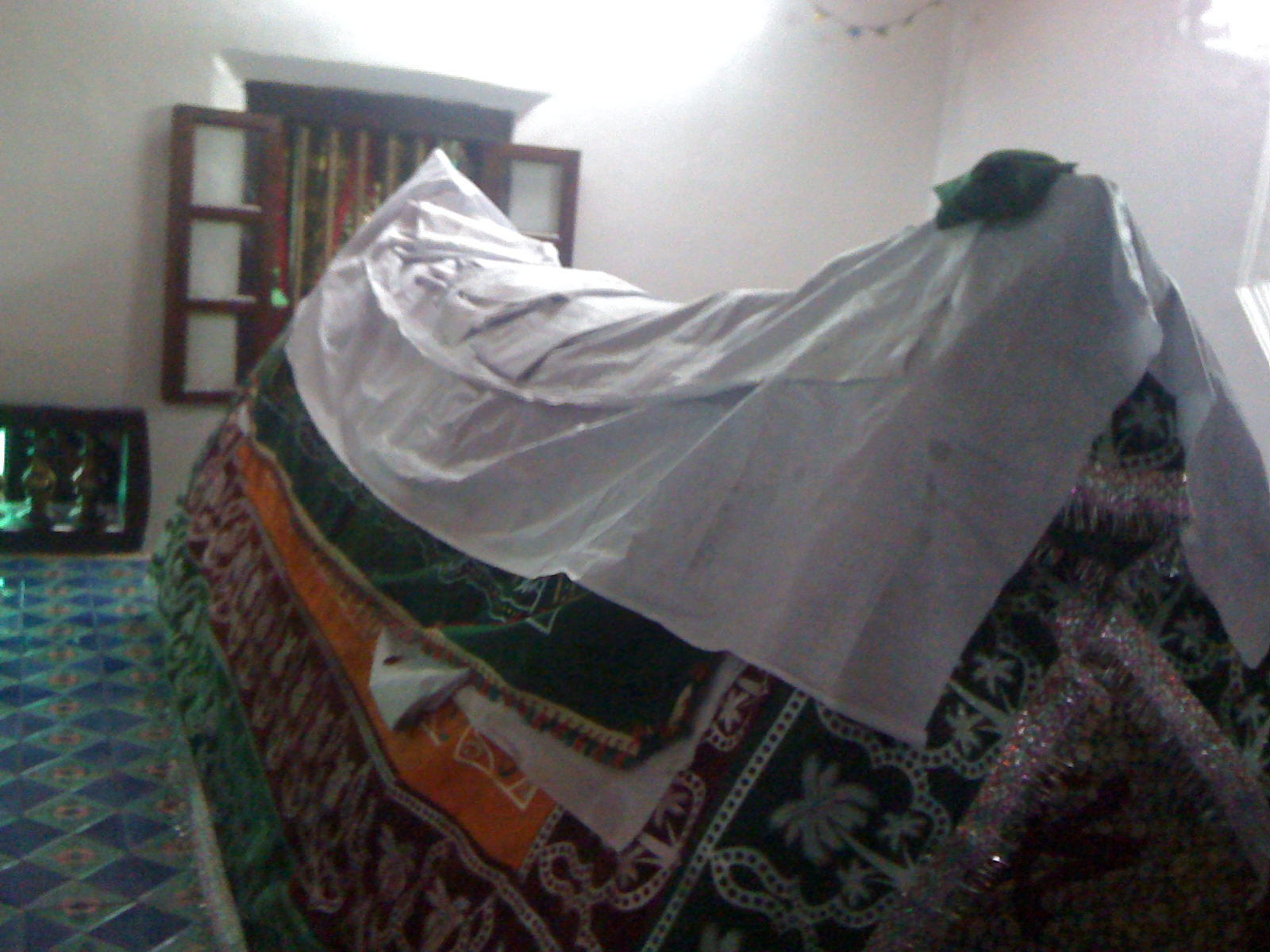
- The grave adornment (Mazar) of Malik ibn Dinar

Personal life
- Born: Kufa, Iraq
- Died: 748 C.E. Unknown. Claimed to be in Thalangara, Kasaragod, Kerala, India
- Resting place: Malik Dinar Mosque, Thalangara, Kasaragod, Kerala, India

Religious life
- Religion: Islam
- Profession: Preacher, Theologian

Muslim leader
- Influenced by: Ali, Hasan al-Basri

Malik ibn Dinar (Arabic: مالك دينار, romanized: Mālik ibn Dīnār, Malayalam: മാലിക് ദീനാര്‍) (died 748 CE) was a Muslim scholar and traveller. He was one of the first known Muslims to have come to India in order to teach Islam in the Indian subcontinent after the departure of King Cheraman Perumal. Historians have disagreed on the exact place of his death, still it is widely believed that he died at Kasaragod and that his "relics" were buried at the Malik Dinar Mosque in Thalangara, Kasaragod but this has no definite proof and has been debunked multiple times as Islamic Scholars have widely disagreed on this notion. Belonging to the generation of the tabi'i, Malik is called a reliable traditionalist in Sunni sources. He was the son of a slave from Kabul who became a disciple of Hasan al-Basri. He died just before the epidemic of plague which caused considerable ravages in Basra in 748-49 CE, with various traditions placing his death either at 744-45 or 747-48 CE.

== Life ==
Malik, a preacher and moralist of Basra, made a living as a teacher and translator of the Qur'an, and seems to have been interested in the question of the various readings of the scripture. During his life, Malik had the occasion to follow more or less regularly the teaching of Basran traditionists and mystics as famous as Anas b. Mālik, Ibn Sīrīn, Hasan of Basra and Rabīʿa al-ʿAdawiyya. He was considered to have led an ascetic life himself, and tradition attributed to him several thaumaturgic gifts and miracles, including the ability to walk on water. Though these miracles have no basis and are just stories by local population, because it is a firm belief that only Prophet's can do Miracles. Also, he seems to have been "a most eloquent ḳāṣṣ" or popular orator of religious sermons who admired, in particular, the eloquence of his contemporary al-Ḥaj̲j̲āj̲ "whom he naturally could see at Baṣra."

According to Ibn al-Faḳīh, "he brought honour to his native town because he was accounted one of the six Baṣrans who were without equals at Kūfa." Later scholars ranging from Abū Nuʿaym to Ibn al-Jawzī reproduce "whole hosts" of proverbial sayings from him, which clearly reflect the extent to which Malik continued to influence Sunni thinkers of all types. According to Pellat, the explicit articulation of the Sufi ideal of the "inner jihad" (the war against one's own soul), also finds its original formulation in Malik, who is believed to have said d̲j̲āhidū ahwāʾakum kamā tud̲j̲āhidūn aʿdāʾakum (“fight against your desires just as you fight against your enemies”), in a maxim that would wield considerable influence upon Islamic mystics through the medieval period. Malik also seems to have had an appreciation for the Christian religion, and may have even read parts of the New Testament for spiritual inspiration in imitating the example of Jesus.

== Legacy ==
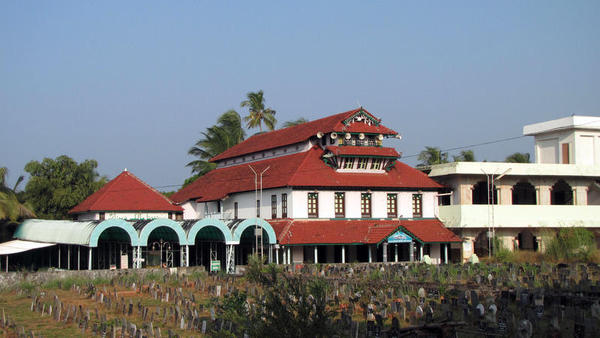
The Malik Dinar Mosque from the gate, prior to its 2018 remodelling

- Malik Deenar Islamic Academy
- Malik Deenar Research Congress
- Malik Dinar Mosque and dargah, sometimes spelled as Malik Deenar Masjid

== See also ==
- Islam in Kerala
- Mappila

== Bibliography ==
- Ibn Ḳutayba, Maʿārif, 470, 577
- ’Ibn Saʿd, Ṭabaḳāt, vii/2, 11
- Ṭabarī, iii, 281
- Abu ’l-ʿArab, Ṭabaḳāt ʿulamāʾ Ifrīḳiya, ed. and tr. M. Ben Cheneb, Algiers 1915-20, 17
- Makkī, Ḳūt al-ḳulūb, iv, 187
- Nawawī, Tahd̲h̲īb, 537
- Pellat, Milieu, 99-100, 257.
