= Malik Dinar Mosque =

Mosque in Kerala, India

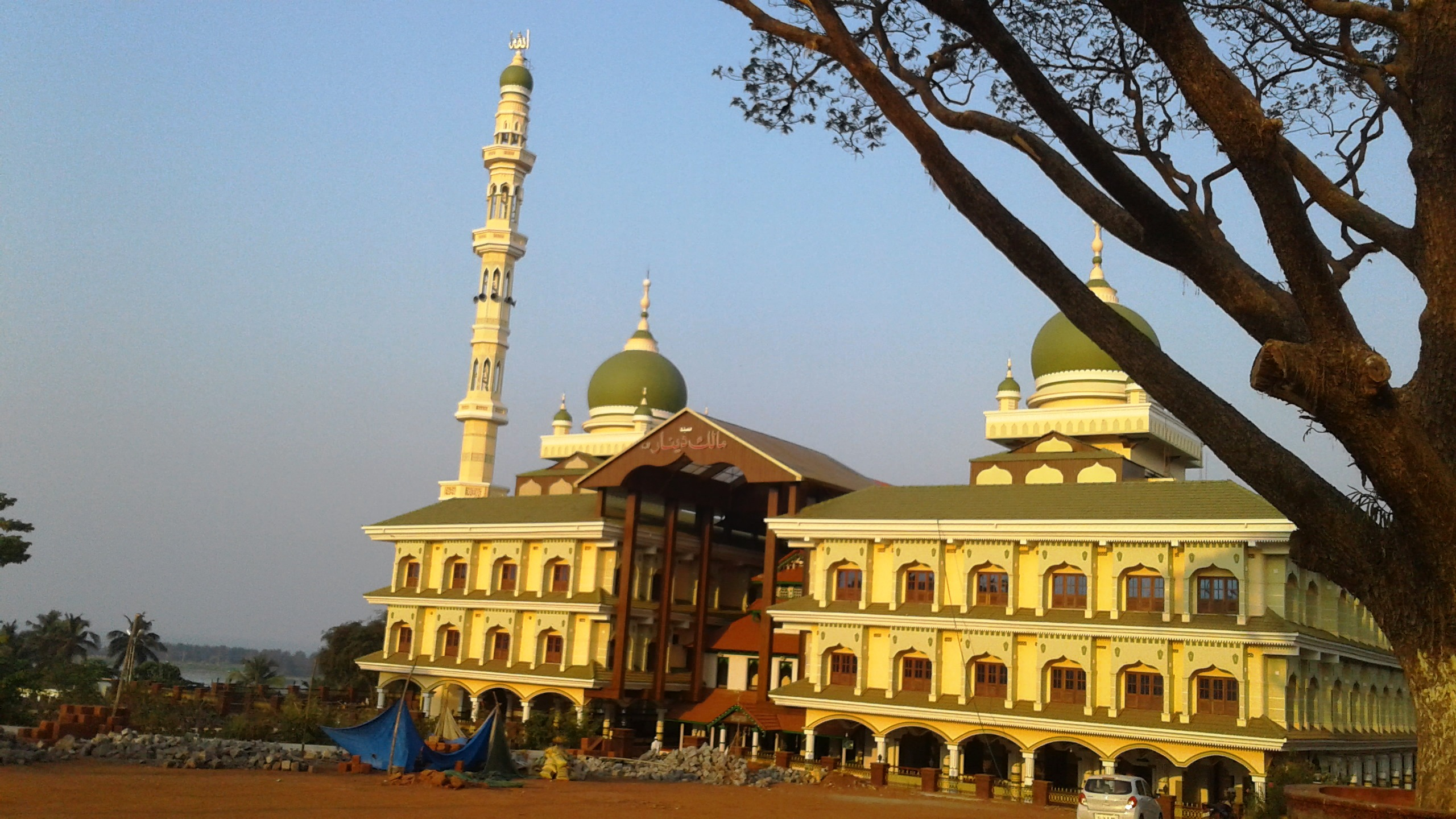
- The remodelled mosque in 2018

- Location of the mosque and dargah in Kerala

Religion
- Affiliation: Sunni Islam
- Sect: Sufism
- Festival: Malik Dinar Uroos
- Ecclesiastical or organisational status: Mosque and dargah
- Status: Active

Location
- Location: Thalangara, Kasaragod district, Kerala
- Country: India
- Coordinates: 12°29′06″N 74°59′20″E

Architecture
- Type: Mosque architecture
- Style: Kerala-Islamic (7th-century); Islamic (2018)
- Founder: Malik Dinar
- Completed: 22 AH (642/643 CE); 1809 (renovations); 2018 (remodelled)

Specifications
- Direction of façade: Ka'ba
- Capacity: 2,000 worshippers
- Dome: Two
- Minaret: One
- Materials: Wood; stone; concrete

The Malik Dinar Mosque, also known locally as the Malik Deenar Masjid and Malik Deenar Juma Masjid, and officially known as the Hazrath Malik Deenar Grand Juma Masjid, is a Sufi Sunni mosque and dargah, located in Thalangara, (Note: Also known as Thalankara.) in the town of Kasaragod, in the state of Kerala, India. Founded by Malik Dinar and believed to have been completed in c. 22 AH (642/643 CE), it is one of the oldest mosques in India. The two-storey mosque was built in the Kerala-Islamic traditional style; and was extensively remodelled in the Islamic style in 2018.

In addition to the mosque and dargah, the complex includes a madrasa, cemetery, and orphanage.

== History ==
Over the years, Kasaragod acquired the considerable importance as a centre of Islam on the west coast of India. It is the site of one of the mosques believed to have been founded by Malik Dinar. According to Qissat Shakarwati Farmad, the mosques at Kodungallur, Kollam, Madayi, Barkur, Mangalore, Kasaragod, Kannur, Dharmadam, Panthalayini, and Chaliyam, were built during the era of Malik Ibn Dinar, and they are among the oldest mosques in Indian subcontinent.

The mosque was completed in 22 AH (642/643 CE), on the 13th Rajab. The mosque was renovated in 1809

=== Grave ===
The mosque contains the dargah of Malik Dinar, one of the Swahaba and the place is sacred to Muslims. The mosque is a prominent pilgrim centre of Kasaragod district.

== Gallery ==
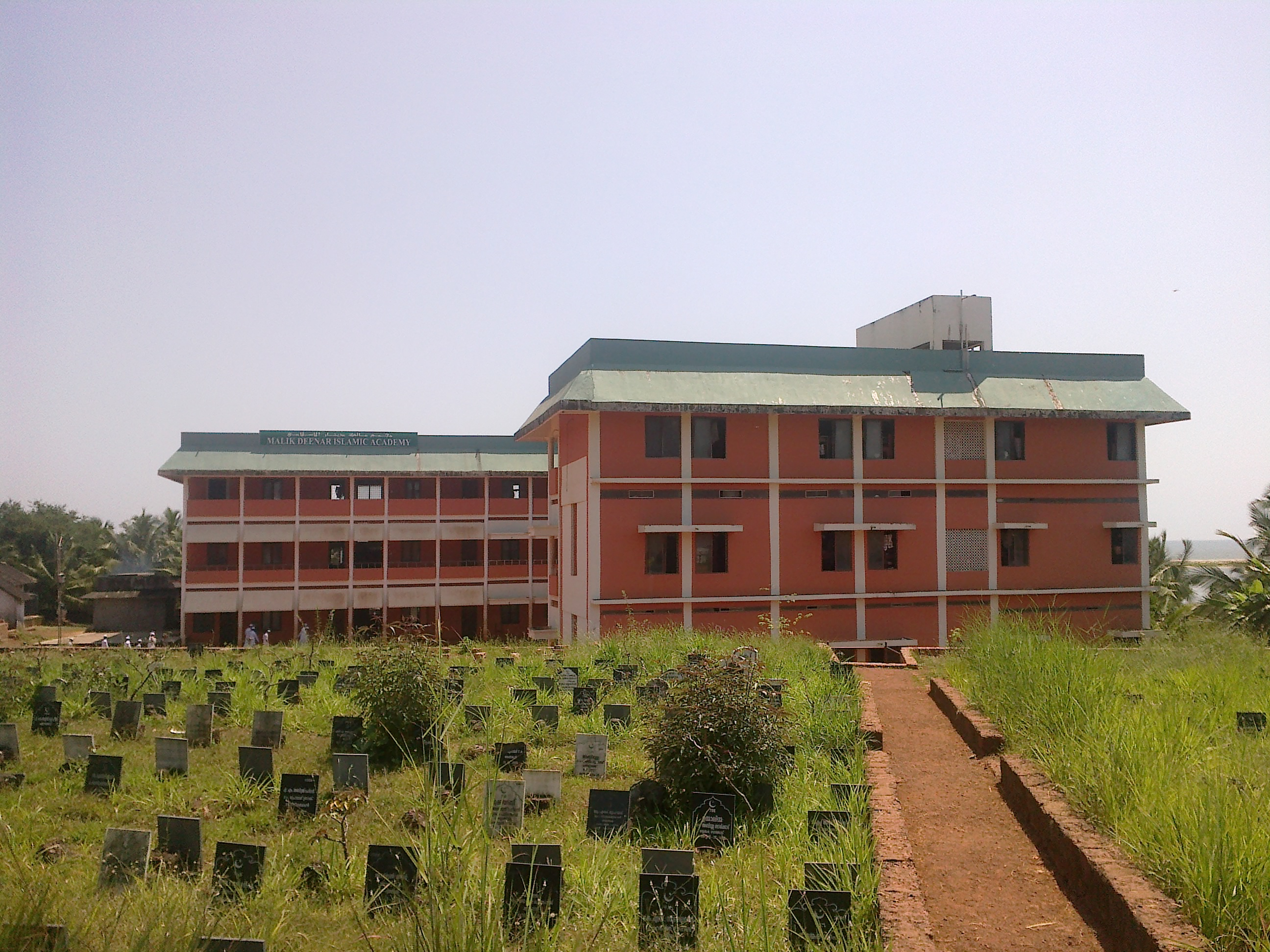
Madrassa

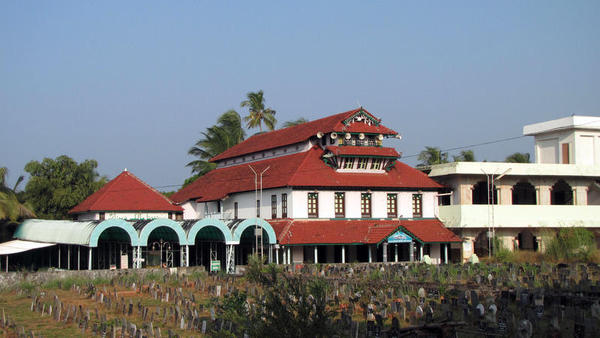
The mosque in 2012, prior to its major expansion

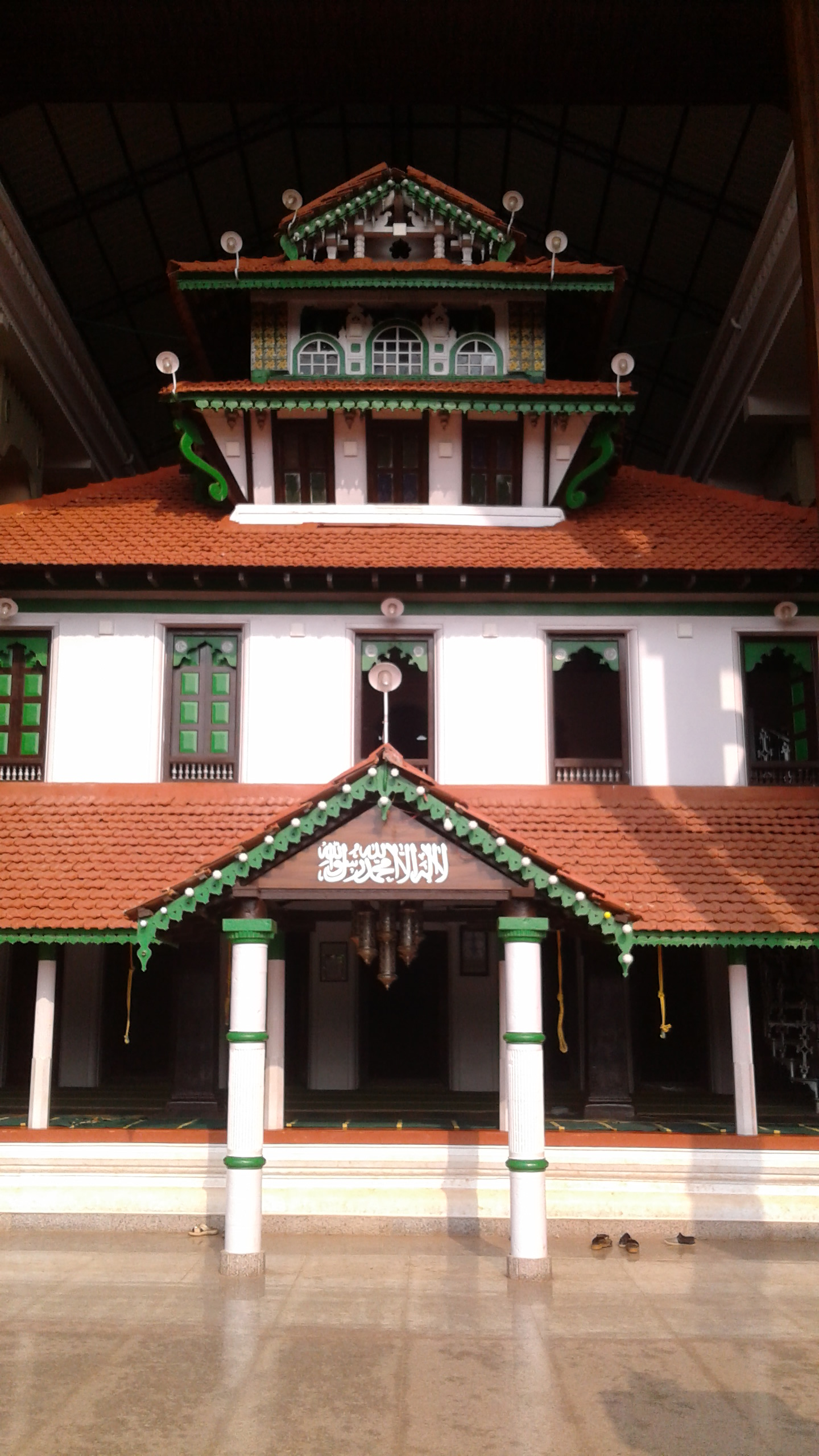
The original mosque

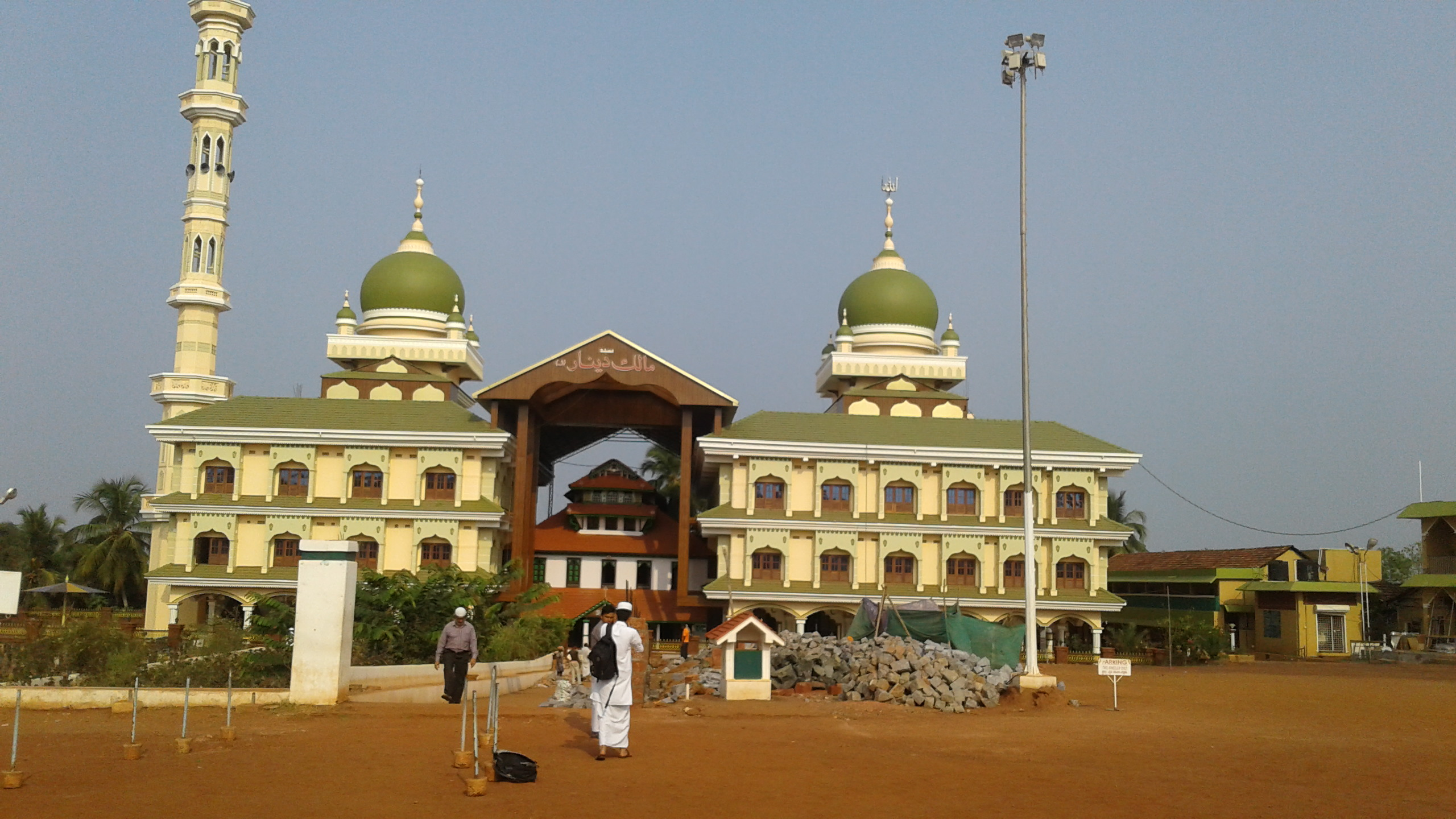
The expanded mosque and dargah, with the old mosque in centre

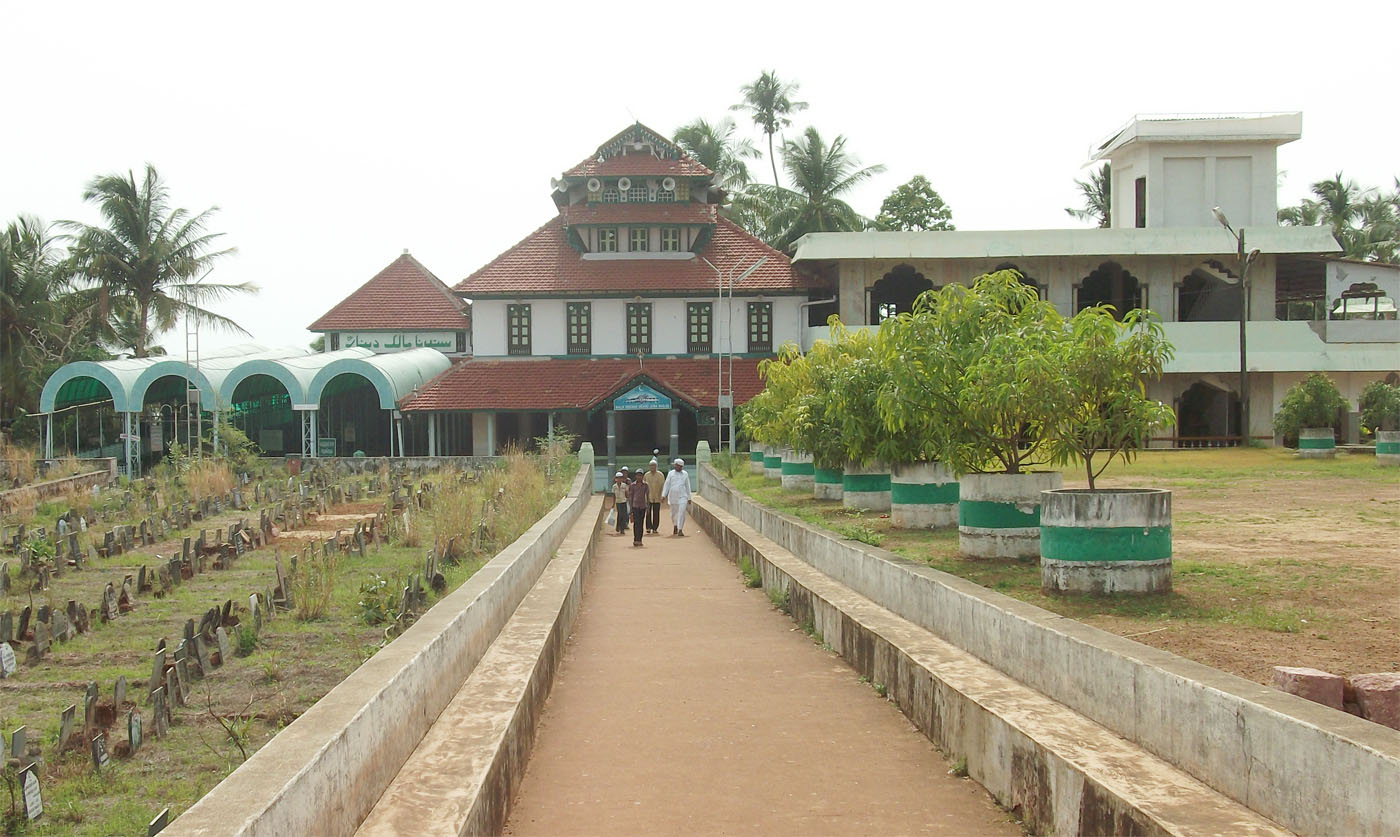
The cemetery

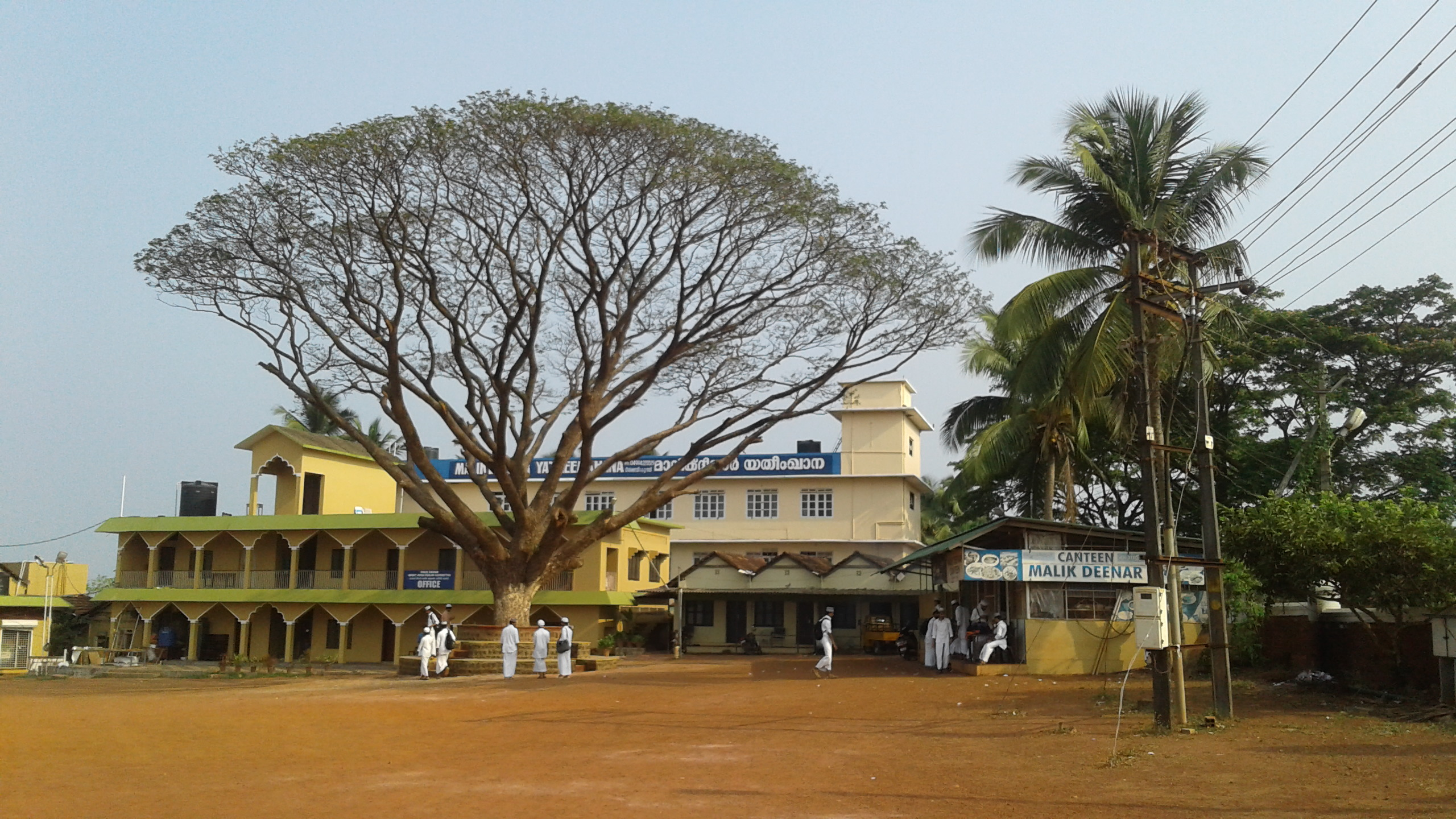
Orphanage

== See also ==
- Islam in India
- List of mosques in India
- List of mosques in Kerala
