= Kalnad =

Coordinates: 12°28′N 75°00′E

Kalanad
- village
- Interactive map of Kalanad
- Country: India
- State: Kerala
- District: Kasaragod

Population (2011)
  - Total: 18,029

Languages
  - Official: Malayalam, English
- Time zone: UTC+5:30 (IST)
- Postal code: 671317
- Vehicle registration: KL-14

Kalanad is a village in Kasaragod district in the state of Kerala, India.

== Demographics ==
As of 2011 India census, Kalanad had a population of 18,029, with 8,386 males and 9,643 females.

== Education ==
Sa-Adiya English Medium Residential Senior Secondary School, Kalanad Hydros jama-ath higher secondary schoo; is a major educational organization in the area.
