= Our Lady of Sorrows Church, Kasargode =

Roman Catholic church in Kerala, India

Coordinates: 12°35′13″N 75°01′20″E

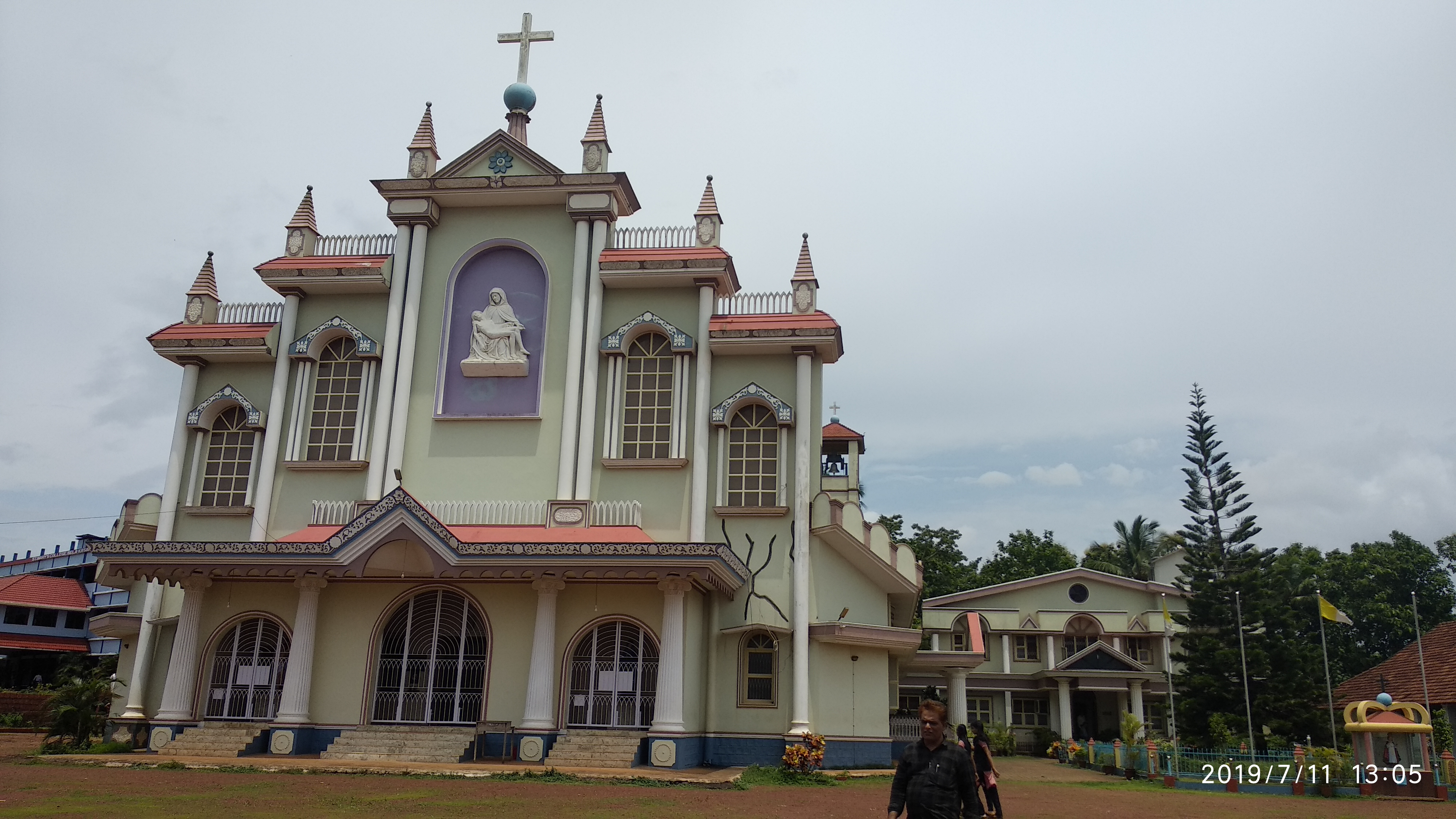
Our Lady of Sorrows Church

Bela Church, also Our Lady of Sorrows Church, is a Roman Catholic church in the Kasargode district of Kerala state, South India, 15 km north of Kasaragod, and 50 km away from Mangalore.

It was built in 1890 and is the oldest church in the district. This Gothic Revival Roman Catholic church is under the Manglore Diocese. The church recently celebrated its centenary and undergone renovations.

In 2021, Fr Stany Pereira became the 10th parish priest of the church.

== See also ==
- Our Lady of Sorrows

== Sources and external links ==
- Bela Church website
