= Edayilakkad =

Island situated in Valiyaparamba Panchayath, Kasaragod district, Kerala, India

Coordinates: 12.133°N 75.157°E

Edayilakkad (Edayilakkadu)
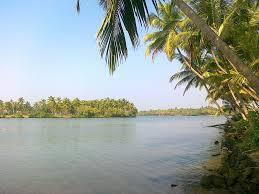
- Edayilakkad
- Interactive map of Edayilakkad (Edayilakkadu)

Geography
- Location: Lake Kavvayi
- Adjacent to: The Kanara

Administration
- Kasaragod district, India

Demographics
- Population: 1305

Edayilakkad (also spelled Edayilakkadu or Edayilekkadu, is a marshy island situated in Valiyaparamba Panchayath, Kasaragod district, Kerala, India. It is located in the Kavvayi Backwaters, a long, almost isolated, arm of the Arabian Sea. Edayilakkad is noted for its biodiversity and local conservation efforts. The island is three to four meters above sea level on average. To the east of Edayilakkad lies the mainland of India.

== History ==
Historic knowledge of the remote area dates to the 2nd century AD. Although it wasn't inhabited until the early 1900s, feudal Lingayats of the Vijayanagara Empire once controlled the region. Before the formation of the Kerala state, the area was part of Madras. An emigration of a mainly Sri Lankan labour force onto the island occurred in the 1930s.

== Location ==
To the south of Edayilakkad lies the island of Madakkal, while the village of Trikkarippur is located on the mainland east of Edayilakkad. The village of Ayitti is due north of the island. The island lies on the Malabar coast. According to India's revenue department, the island has an area of 312.01 acres (126.27 ha). Due to its width, Edayilakkad is one of the largest islands in the northern parts of Kerala.

== Geography ==
Lake Kavvayi, in which Edayilakkad is situated, is separated from the Arabian Sea on the west by a thin strip of land, which was probably formed due to embayment (a gradual separation of the lake from the sea). This strip is called Valiyavaramba (meaning "Big Border"). The area of Lake Kavvayi is approximately 1,264 km^{2} (488 sq mi).

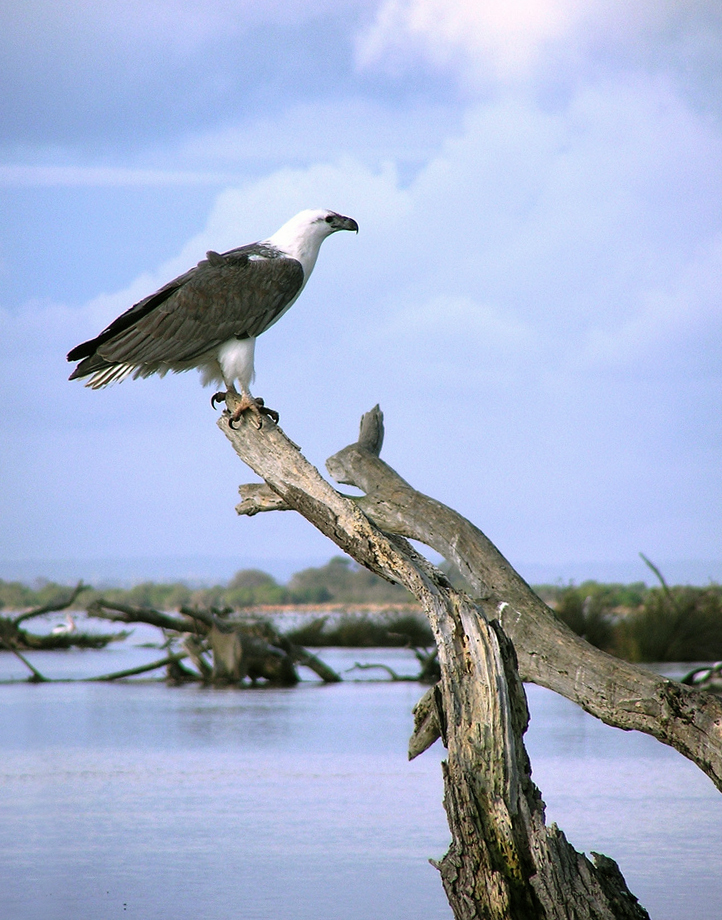
The island of Edayilakkad is an important nesting area for the endangered Whitebellied Sea Eagle (Halineetus leucogaster)

=== Backwaters ===
Located 30 km [19 mi] from Bekal, the Kavvayi Backwaters is one of the most picturesque backwater boroughs in Kerala. The Valiyaparamba Backwaters of Edayilakkad are approximately 21 km [13 mi] long, and 37.0 km [23.0 mi] long; and are formed from the confluence of seven rivers. The backwaters are at the southern end of the Tejeswini River.

== Population ==
There are 1,305 people living in 250 houses on the island.

== Fauna and flora ==
Edayilakkad is biodiverse, including being a nesting area for the state endangered white-bellied sea eagle, and home to Nervilia orchids. The island is a home to a large mangrove forest biome.

== Shelter for Monkeys ==
A small forest (it is called "Kaavu") is there in Edayilakkad. It is the shelter for many monkeys. There are so many monkeys there. It is an attraction for visitors. They will feed the monkeys. More over, an old lady, living nearby, feeds the monkeys regularly. On special occasions like the festival, Onam, special feast is given to the monkeys.

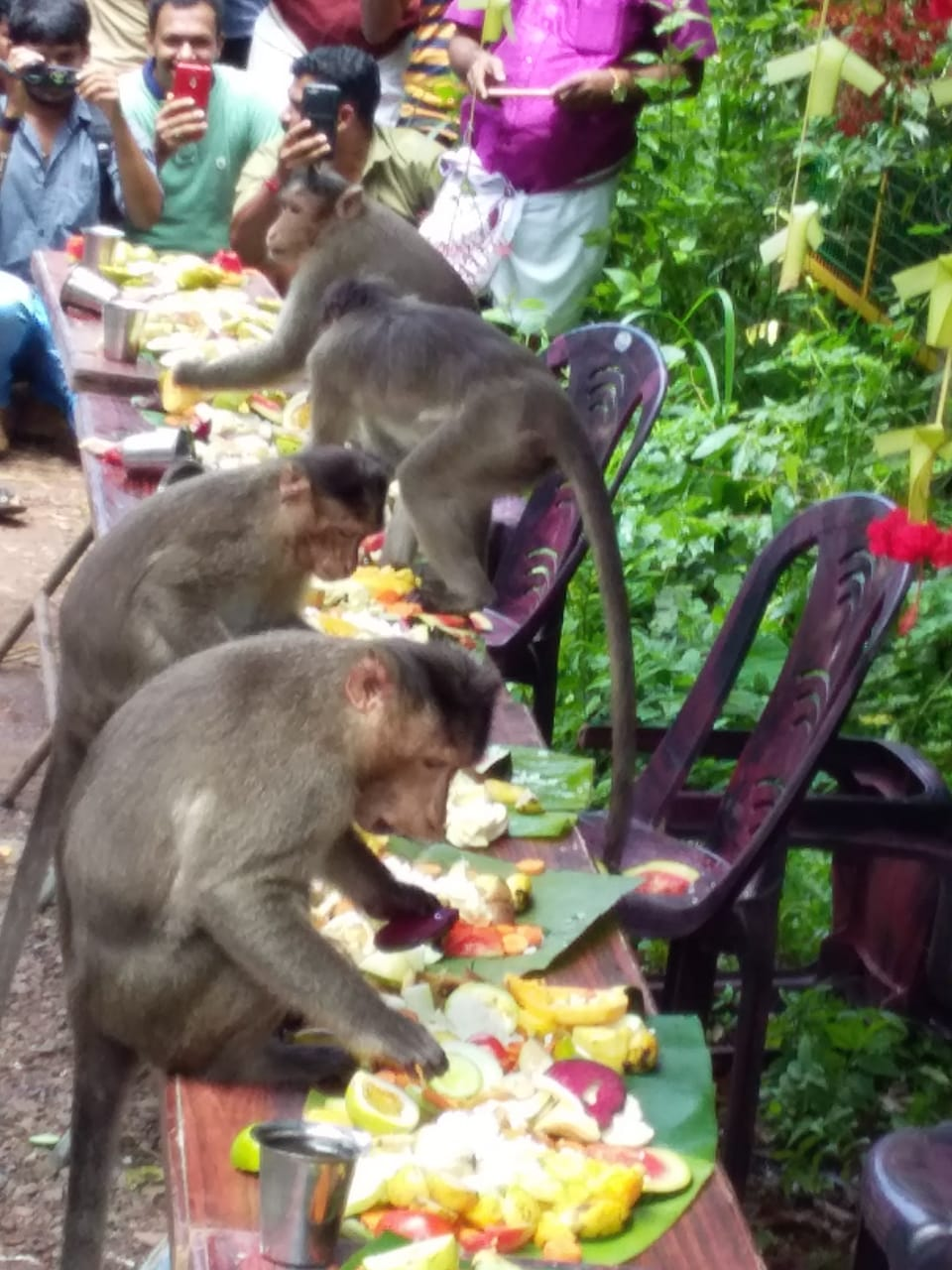
Feast for Monkeys as a part of ONAM Festival.

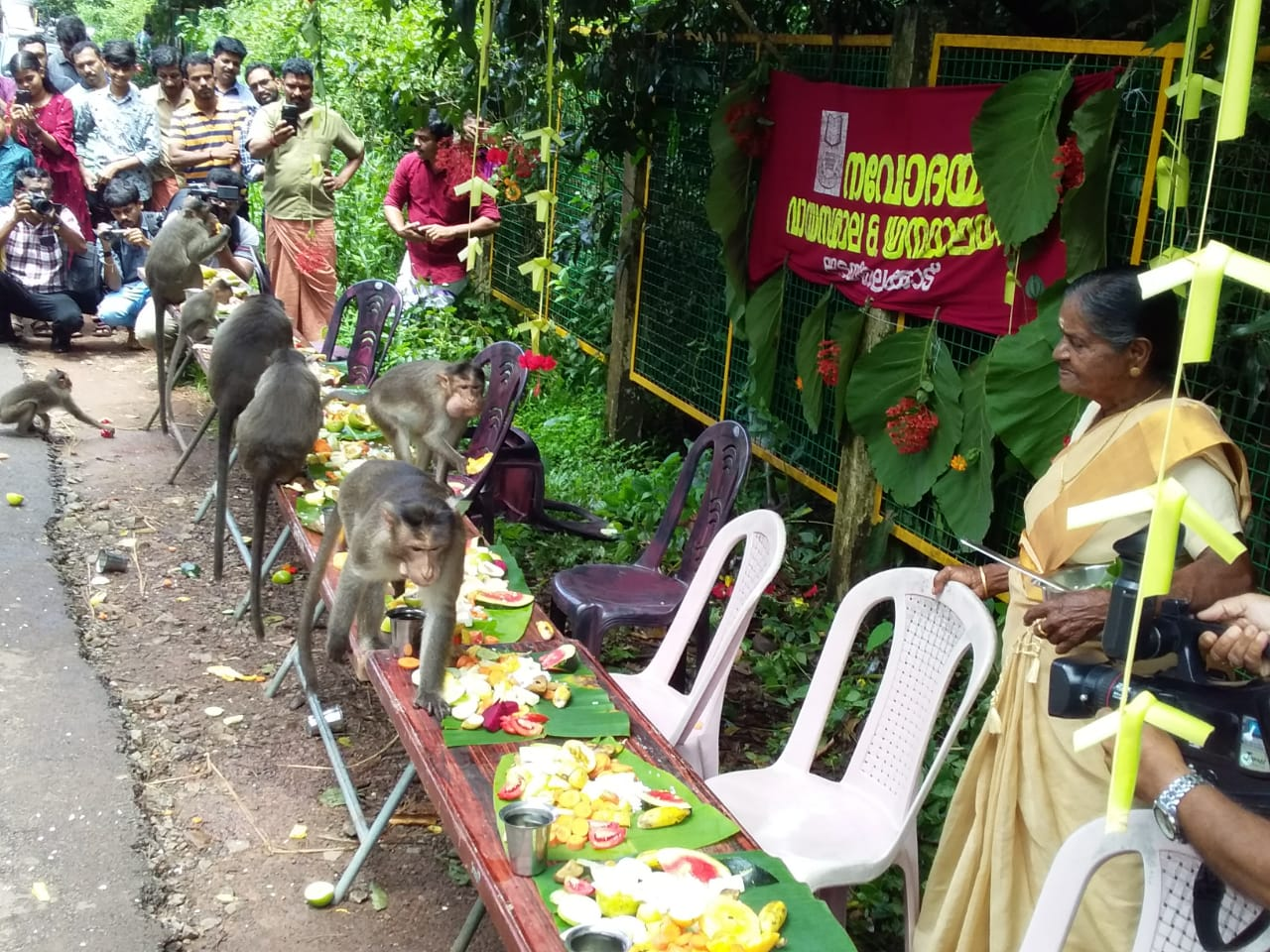
