= Chandragiri River =

River in India

Chandragiri River Perumpuzha / Payaswini
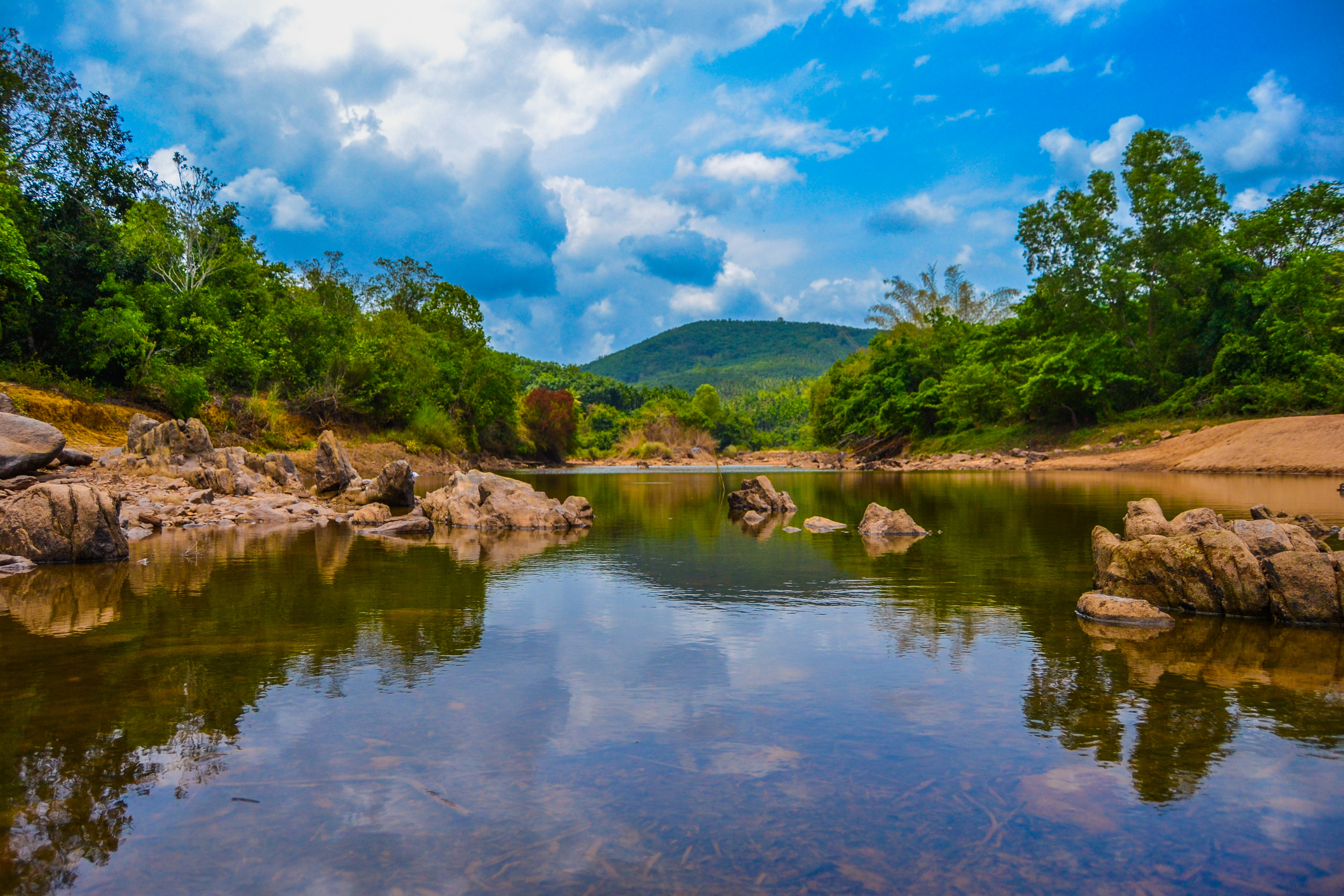
- A view of the Chandragiri river from Kanathur, Kasaragod
- Etymology: Chandragupta Maurya

Location
- Country: India
- State: Kerala, Karnataka
- District: Kasaragod, Dakshina Kannada, Kodagu
- Cities: Sullia, Jalsoor, Chengala, Chemnad, Kasaragod

Physical characteristics
- Source: Kadamakal Reserve Forest, Karnataka
  - location: Kodagu District, India
  - coordinates: 12.45495°N, 75.67224°E
  - elevation: 1290m
- Mouth: Arabian Sea
  - location: Near Thalangara, Kasaragod, India
  - coordinates: 12°28′25″N 74°59′04″E
  - elevation: 0 m (0 ft)
- Length: 105 km (65 mi)
- Discharge
  - location: mouth

Basin features
- Tributaries
  - left: Kudumbur River

The Chandragiri River, also known as the Payaswini River in Karnataka and as the Perumpuzha in Kerala, is the longest river in Kasaragod district, Kerala, India. The river is a historical treasure of Chemnad. It was named after the Mauryan emperor Chandragupta Maurya.

The river originates in the Talakaveri Wildlife Sanctuary in the Western Ghats of Kodagu district, Karnataka. It flows through towns including Sullia, Jalsoor, Parappa, Adoor, Chengala, Kasaragod and Chemnad and discharges into the Arabian Sea. In Sullia taluk, it is the major water source for domestic and agricultural purposes. Chemnad is considered as the Land Of Chandragiri.

== History ==
The Chandragiri or Perumpuzha River is considered the traditional boundary between the Tulu Nadu and Malayalam regions of Kerala.

In 16th-century Portuguese geographies, the Chandragiri River is called the "Rio Cangerecora", and identified as the boundary between the "province of Canará" (Kannada-speaking coastal south Karnataka, vassal of "Bisnaga", Vijayanagara Empire) and the independent kingdoms of "Malabar" (Kerala).

The 17th-century Chandragiri Fort is located on the river.

== Course ==
The Chandragiri River originates from the northern slopes of the Greater Talacauvery National Park in the Western Ghats at the Kodagu district, Karnataka. Initially the river flows through the Malenadu region of Karnataka passing the Pushpagiri Wildlife Sanctuary and flowing through several hilly towns in Kodagu and Dakshina Kannada like Adyadka, Biliyar, Parivarkana, Paladka, Sullia, Pilikodi and Kanyana. Chandragiri then enters Kerala and flows through several hilly towns in the eastern part of the Kasaragod district – Panjikkal, Kottyadi, Adhur, Poovadka, Kottamkuzhy, Bethurpuzha, Kundamkuzhy, Kolathur, Muliyar and Bovikanam. At Bovikanam its major tributary, Kudumbur River merges with Perumpuzha. Then the river enters into the Malabar plains where it flows through Thekkil, Chengala, Chattanchal, Perumbala, Chemnad and Kasaragod. The Chandragiri River empties into the Arabian Sea at Thalangara in Kasaragod town.

== Ecology ==
The Chandragiri River basin supports diverse ecosystems typical of the Western Ghats, including tropical wet evergreen forests in the upper reaches and riparian zones with moist deciduous species downstream. The river originates within the Talakaveri Wildlife Sanctuary, a key biodiversity area with endemic flora like the evergreen Hopea ponga and fauna including the lion-tailed macaque, Malabar giant squirrel, and over 250 bird species such as the Malabar whistling thrush. Downstream, it borders the Brahmagiri Wildlife Sanctuary in Kerala, habitat for Asian elephants, Bengal tigers, and amphibians like the Malabar gliding frog in riverine wetlands.

Aquatic biodiversity includes native fish such as the Deccan mahseer and hill trout, vital for local fisheries. Conservation initiatives by the Kerala Forest Department emphasize riparian afforestation and eco-development to address deforestation and erosion risks from high monsoon flows (average annual rainfall ~3,500 mm in the basin).

== Tributaries ==
The Chandragiri River receives numerous tributaries originating in the Western Ghats of Kodagu and flowing into Kasaragod. The table below lists all major and minor tributaries documented in official government records.

Tributary	Length (km)	Origin	Confluence	Ref
Kudumbur River	48	Brahmagiri Hills, Kodagu	Left bank at Bovikanam (east of Chattanchal)	
Kuppam River	22	Talakaveri Wildlife Sanctuary, Kodagu	Near Chemnad, Kasaragod	
Shiriya River	28	Western Ghats near Shiriya, Kasaragod	Near Thalangara estuary	
Koodlu Hole	18	Pattighat Reserve Forest, Kodagu	Near Koodlu village, Kasaragod	
Poonkoth Hole	12	Sampaje Range, Dakshina Kannada	Near Poonkoth, Sullia taluk	
Kanyana Hole	15	Pushpagiri Wildlife Sanctuary	Near Kanyana, Kasaragod	
Kalnad Hole	~10	Kalnad village hills, Kasaragod	Near Kalnad, Hosdurg taluk	
Peruvanje Hole	~8	Peruvanje Reserve Forest, Sullia	Near Peruvanje, Kasaragod border	
Adyanadka Nullah	~6	Adyanadka village, Kasaragod	Near Adyanadka, left bank	
Chalingal Nullah	~5	Chalingal hills, Hosdurg	Near Chalingal, right bank	

The Kudumbur River is the longest and most significant tributary, contributing approximately 25% of the Chandragiri's total discharge during peak monsoon. Smaller nullahs and seasonal streams are numerous but not individually mapped in official records.

== See also ==
- Kanhangad
- Kasaragod
- Mangalore
