= Attenganam =

Village in Kerala, India

Coordinates: 12°23′25″N 75°11′45″E

Attenganam is a town in the Kasaragod District of the Indian state of Kerala. Primary road SH 56 connects Kanhangad and Panathur. The route has a limited bus service. Near by towns are Thattummal and Odayanchal

Panchayath	Kodom Belur Grama Panchayath
Village	Belur
Taluk	Hosdurg
Post Office	Attenganam PO, 671531
Bus Stop	Attenganam Bus stop

== Transportation ==
This village is connected to Karnataka state through Panathur. A 20 km road connects Panathur to Sullia in Karnataka from where Bangalore and Mysore can be easily accessed. Locations in Kerala can be accessed via unpaved roads. The nearest railway station is Kanhangad railway station on Mangalore-Palakkad line. Airports are at Mangalore and Kannur.
