= Benoor =

Village in Kerala, India

Benoor /b ae n u: r/ is a small village located at Kasaragod district of Kerala state India.

== Etymology ==
Popularly known as Benoor Perumbala.

== Location ==
Perumbala is the nearby village and benoor is a part of that village.

Nearest paces ° Deli 1.1 km

- Paravanadukkam 1 km
- ° Koliyadukkam 1 km
- °Perumbala 1.5 km.

Located 5 km away from Kasaragod town.

== Administration ==
Part of Chemnad Gramapanchayath, Kasaragod district panchayath, Udma legislative assembly, Chengala legislative division.

== Demography ==
Majority of residents of Benoor belongs to Muslim, Hindu religion.

== Temples ==
- Rifayiya Juma Masjid, Benoor
- Venoor temple, Benoor

Sub places at benoor include Kakkandam, Kundadukkam & Maanthotty.

Commonly spoke language is Malayalam

Covers about 5 km.sq of Chemnad gramapanchayath

Youth clubs include Bhagathsingh Youth Club Benoor, AKG library Kundadukkam, Jannath Ben Street. benoor

Transportation

Nearest Railway station is Kalanad [do have stop only for passenger trains]

The major railway station is Kasaragod.

Nearest airport is at Mangalore known asBajpe/ Managalore (IXE) international Airport.

Kerala state road transport corporation (K S R T C) bus is the only bus transportation covering benoor which have stops at kappana [750m] and kundadukkam[200m]. Private bus service is not available
