= Kudumbur River =

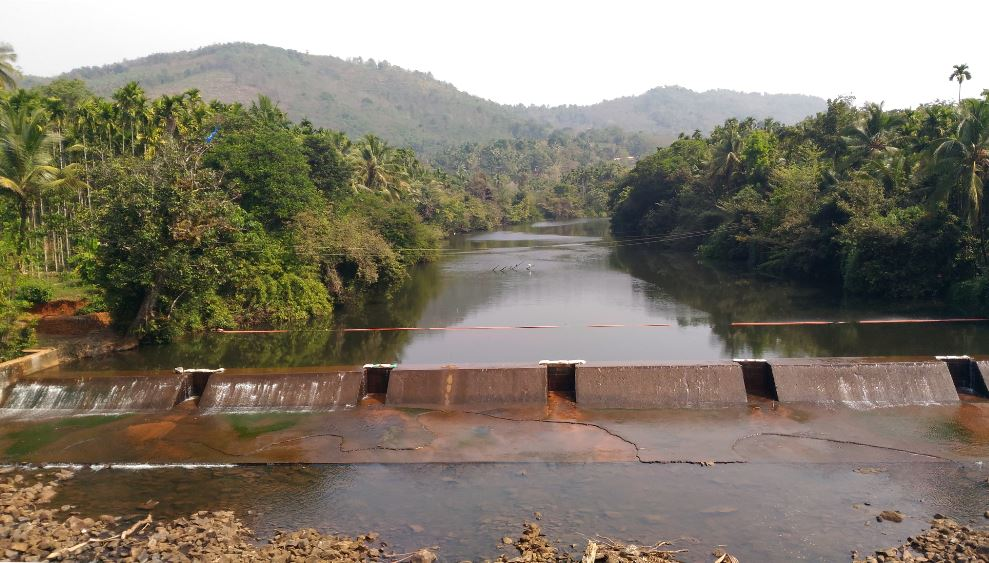
- A check dam across the Kudumbur at Kudumboor Bridge

Location
- Country: India
- State: Kerala, Karnataka
- District: Kasaragod, Dakshina Kannada, Kodagu.

Physical characteristics
- Source
  - location: Talakaveri Wildlife Sanctuary
  - elevation: 1,310 metres (4,300 ft)
- Mouth: Chandragiri River
  - coordinates: 12°28′54″N 75°04′43″E
  - elevation: 20 metres (66 ft)

Basin features
- River system: Chandragiri River

The Kudumbur River is a river that flows mainly through the Kasaragod district of the Indian state of Kerala, although its source and some early sections are in the Kodagu and Dakshina Kannada districts of Karnataka. It is the largest tributary of the Chandragiri River.

== Course ==
The Kudumbur's source is located in Talakaveri Wildlife Sanctuary in the Western Ghats of Karnataka. From its source it flows west, crossing into Kerala east of Panathur in Vellarikundu taluk. Its crosses the Kerala-Karnataka border west of Panathur, flowing again in Karnataka for a short distance before crossing back into Kerala east of Panathady. It continues west, passing to the north of Panathady and to the south of Karivedakam, before turning south for a short distance and passing to the west of Kallar. After this, it turns west again, and forms part of the border between Vellarikundu and Kasaragod taluks. Later, it defines part of the border between Kasaragod and Hosdurg taluks. North of Periya, the Kudumbur curves to the right, and assumes a northern course. It meanders northward until it joins the Payaswini River on that river's left bank east of Chattanchal.
