= Peruvanje Hole =

Stream in Kasaragod district, Kerala

- Location of Peruvanje Hole in Kerala

Location
- Country: India
- State: Kerala
- District: Kasaragod district

Physical characteristics
- Source
  - location: Peruvanje Reserve Forest, Sullia taluk
  - coordinates: 12.4167°N 75.2500°E
  - elevation: 220 m
- Mouth: Chandragiri River
  - location: Near Peruvanje village, Kasaragod district
  - coordinates: 12°24′00″N 75°12′00″E
  - elevation: 0 m (0 ft)
- Length: 8 km (5.0 mi)
- Basin size: 28 km^{2} (11 sq mi)

Basin features
- Cities: Peruvanje

Peruvanje Hole is a minor perennial stream and left-bank tributary of the Chandragiri River in Kasaragod district, Kerala, India. It originates in the Peruvanje Reserve Forest near the Kerala-Karnataka border and flows approximately 8 km through forested hills and coconut plantations before joining the Chandragiri near Peruvanje village.

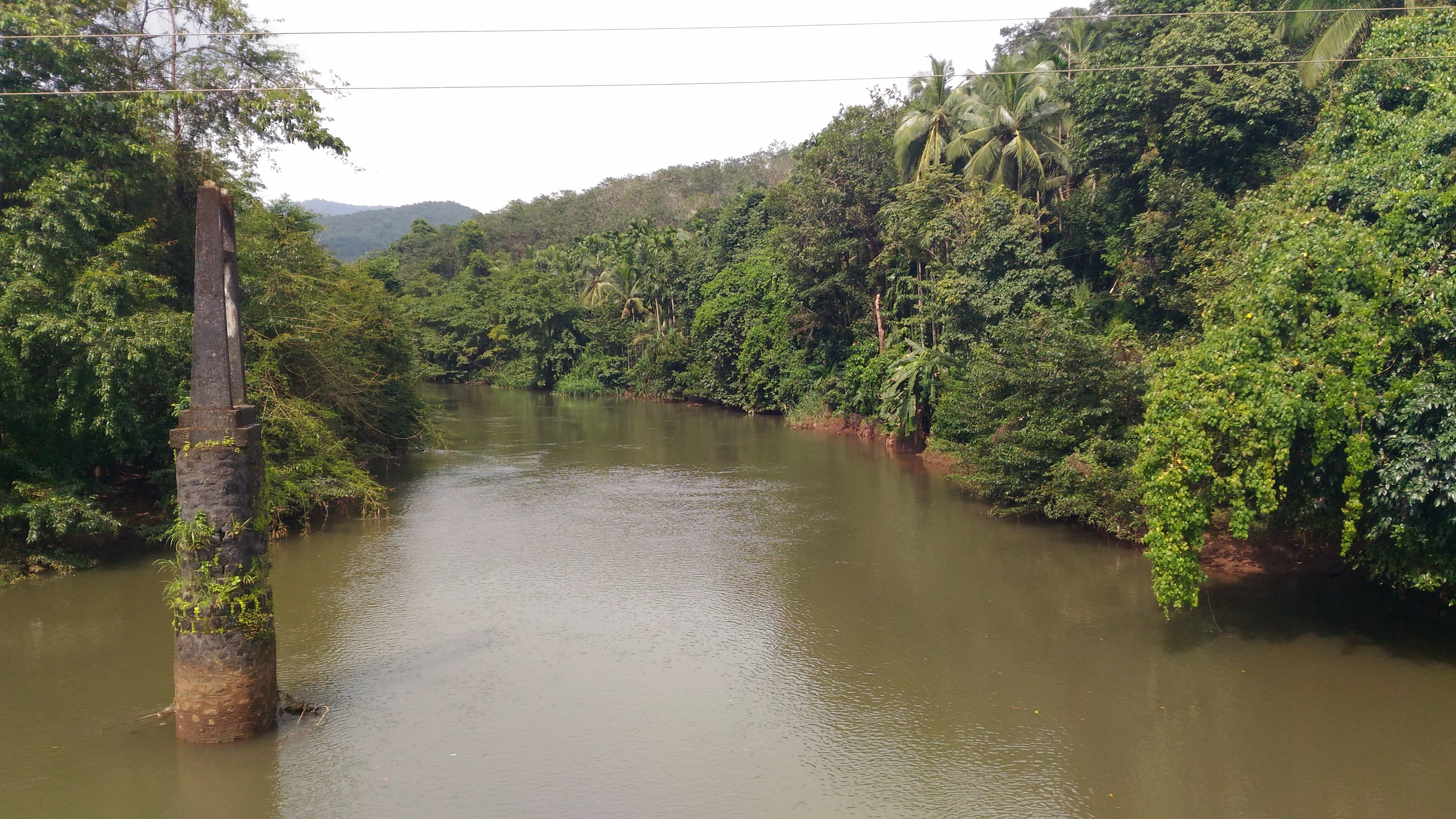
Chandragiri River basin near Peruvanje Hole's mouth, showing riparian landscape (Balanthode, Kasaragod)

== Course ==
Peruvanje Hole drains a small basin of about 28 km², primarily within Sullia taluk (Karnataka) and Kasaragod district (Kerala). It supports minor irrigation and groundwater recharge in the region.

== Ecology ==
The Peruvanje Hole flows through forested foothills with riparian vegetation including bamboo, teak, and moist deciduous species typical of the Western Ghats border zone. Aquatic life includes native fish such as mahseer and hill stream loaches, though monsoon flooding can disrupt habitats. Conservation efforts focus on forest buffer zones and erosion control under eco-development programs.
