= Balanthode =

Town in Kasaragod district, Kerala, India

Balanthode ബളാന്തോട്
- Small town
- Location in Kerala, India
- Coordinates: 12.459°N 75.322°E
- Country: India
- State: Kerala
- District: Kasaragod
- Taluk: Vellarikundu
- Panchayat: Panathady
- PIN: 671532
- Telephone code: 0467
- Vehicle registration: KL-79

Balanthode (ബളാന്തോട്, [bɐɭaːn̪t̪oːɖ]; also written as Balamthodu) is a small hillside town in the eastern highlands of the Kasaragod district in Kerala, India. The town is situated within the Vellarikundu taluk and comes under the administration of the Panathady Grama Panchayat.

== Geography ==
Balanthode is located about 34 kilometers east of Kanhangad, right on the main road leading toward Panathur. It sits in the hilly terrain approaching the Western Ghats mountain range, near the forest borders of the Ranipuram ecosystem. The local economy is largely driven by agriculture, with hillsides dominated by rubber, areca nut, and black pepper farming. Like most highland areas of northern Malabar, the town receives heavy rainfall during the monsoon seasons.

== Community and education ==
The town functions as a central point for schooling and public amenities for families living in the surrounding rural countryside. The main educational institution is the Government Higher Secondary School (GHSS) Balanthode, which serves secondary school students from across the Panathady, Kallar, and Balal panchayats.

The town also holds local water infrastructure distribution systems managed under the rural utility supply databases of the Kerala Water Authority.

== Transport ==
The primary thoroughfare is the Kanhangad - Panathur Road, which continues eastward across the state border into Karnataka, linking the area directly to Sullia, Madikeri, and Coorg. Local transit relies heavily on private buses and jeep networks. The closest major rail hub is the Kanhangad railway station, while international air travel is handled by Kannur International Airport or Mangalore International Airport.

== See also ==
- Kasaragod district
- Ranipuram Hills
- Panathur
