= Koodlu Hole =

Stream in Kasaragod district, Kerala

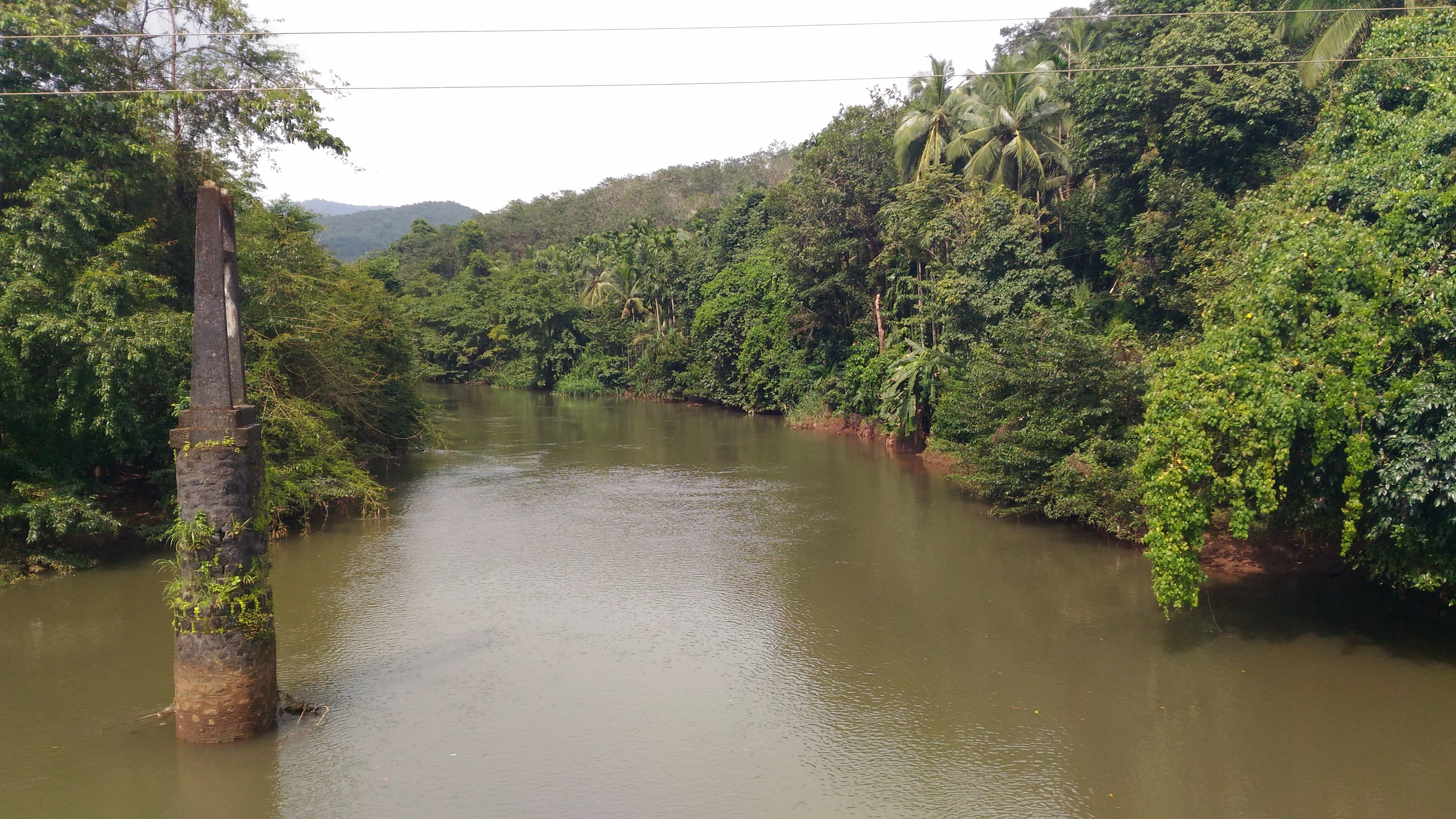

- Location of Koodlu Hole in Kerala

Location
- Country: India
- State: Kerala
- District: Kasaragod district

Physical characteristics
- Source
  - location: Pattighat Reserve Forest, Kodagu
  - coordinates: 12.5000°N 75.2000°E
  - elevation: 250 m
- Mouth: Chandragiri River
  - location: Near Koodlu village, Kasaragod district
  - coordinates: 12°30′00″N 75°08′00″E
  - elevation: 0 m (0 ft)
- Length: 18 km (11 mi)
- Basin size: 85 km^{2} (33 sq mi)

Basin features
- Cities: Koodlu

Koodlu Hole is a perennial stream and right-bank tributary of the Chandragiri River in Kasaragod district, Kerala, India. It originates in the Pattighat Reserve Forest of Kodagu district, Karnataka, and flows approximately 18 km along the Kerala-Karnataka border before joining the Chandragiri near Koodlu village.

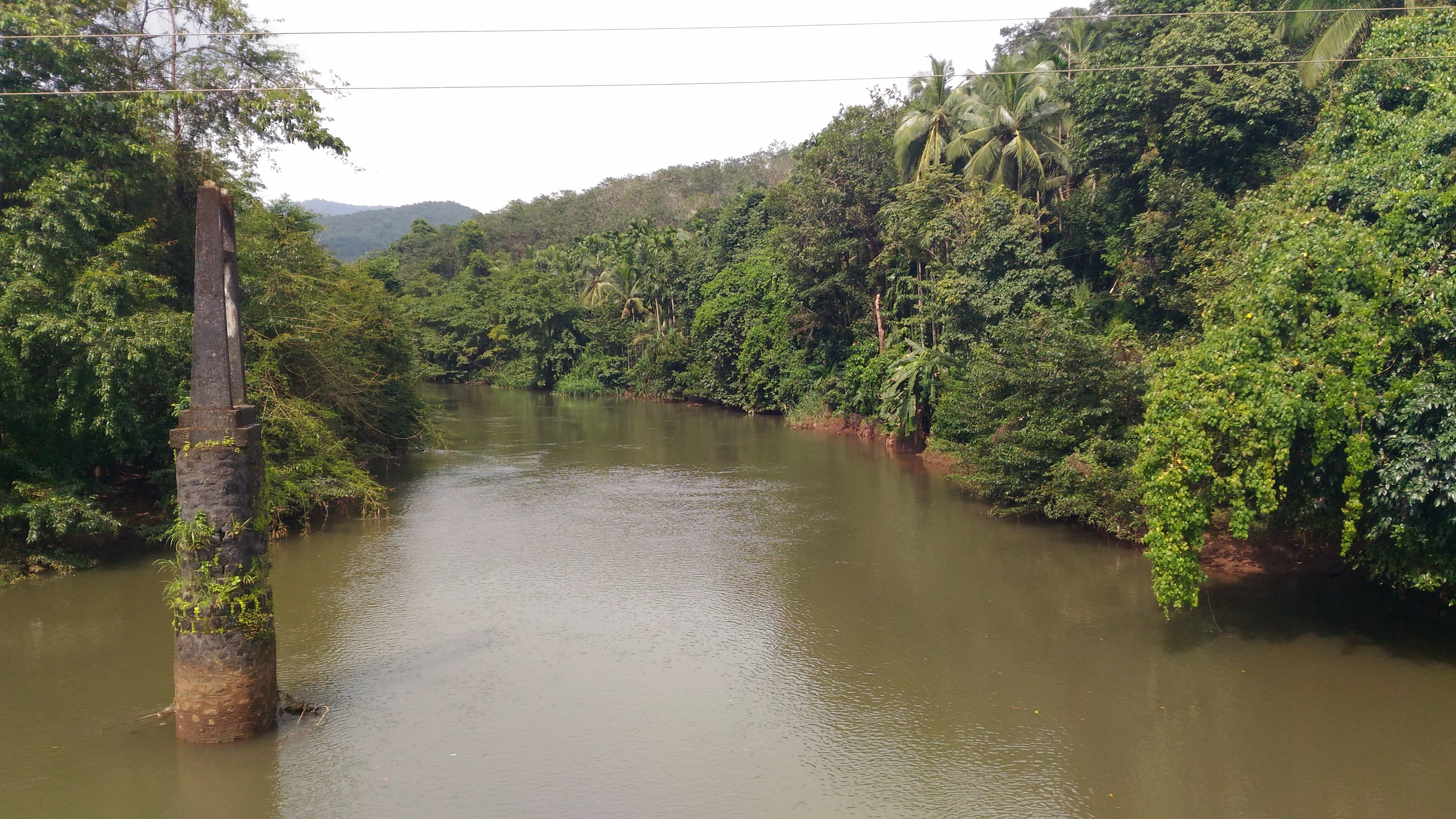
Chandragiri River basin near Koodlu Hole's mouth, showing riparian landscape (Balanthode, Kasaragod)

== Course ==
Koodlu Hole drains a basin of about 85 km^{2}, forming part of the natural boundary between Kasaragod taluk and Sullia taluk in Karnataka. It facilitates cross-border irrigation for paddy and areca nut crops in the lower reaches.

== Ecology ==
The Koodlu Hole passes through semi-evergreen forests of the Kodagu-Kasaragod border, supporting riparian flora like wild mango and cane thickets. It hosts native fish species including Deccan mahseer and barbels, contributing to the regional aquatic food web, with peak flows during monsoons aiding migration. Conservation includes joint Kerala-Karnataka patrols for watershed protection against illegal logging and siltation.
