= Chengala =

Chengala East Kasargod
- Town
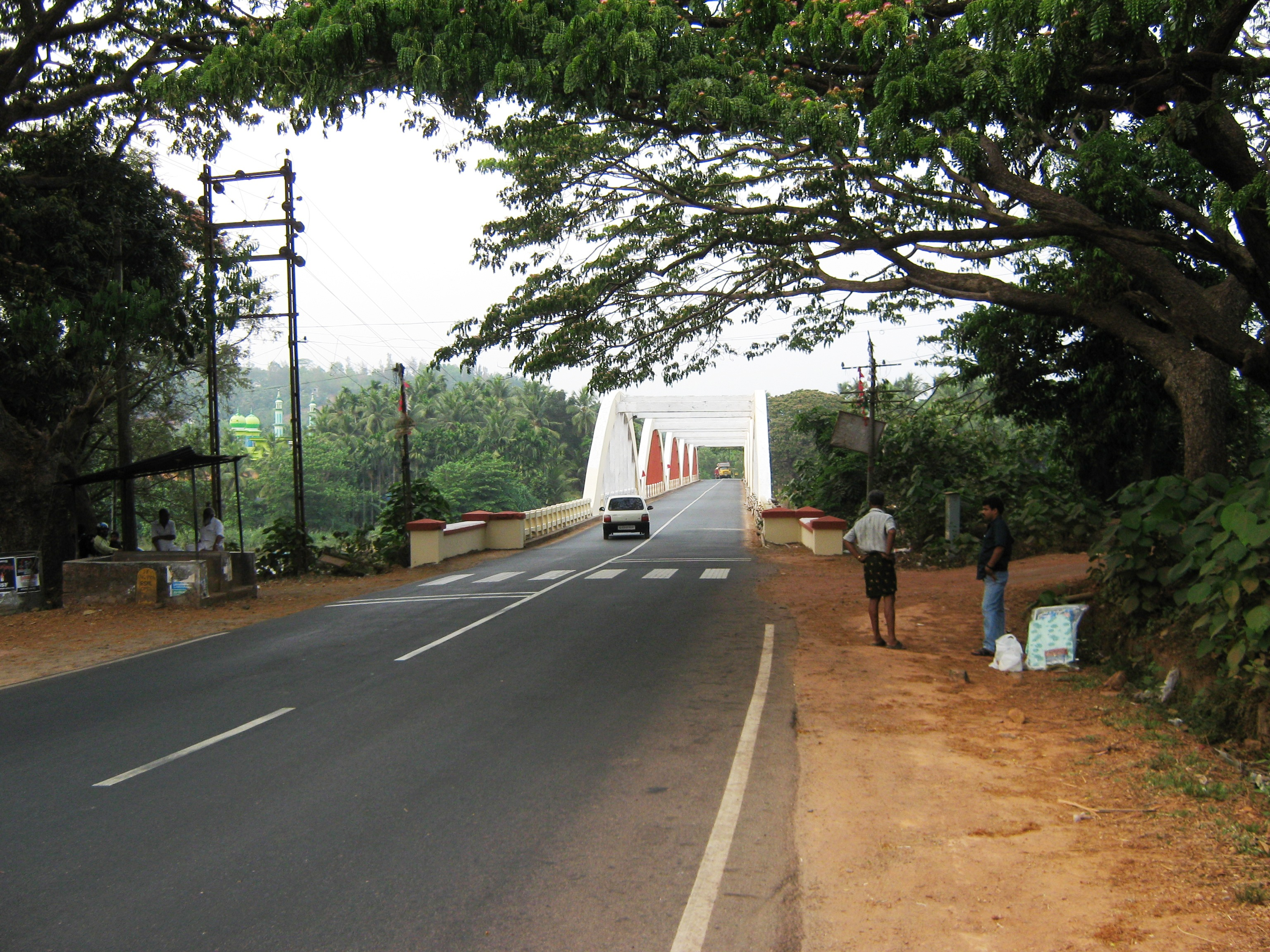
- Thekkil Bridge, looking north towards Chengala
- Interactive map of Chengala
- Coordinates: 12.508710°N 75.055770°E
- Country: India
- State: Kerala
- District: Kasaragod

Area
  - Total: 9.07 km^{2} (3.50 sq mi)

Population (2011)
  - Total: 15,588
  - Density: 1,720/km^{2} (4,450/sq mi)

Languages
  - Official: Malayalam, English
- Time zone: UTC+5:30 (IST)
- Vehicle registration: KL-

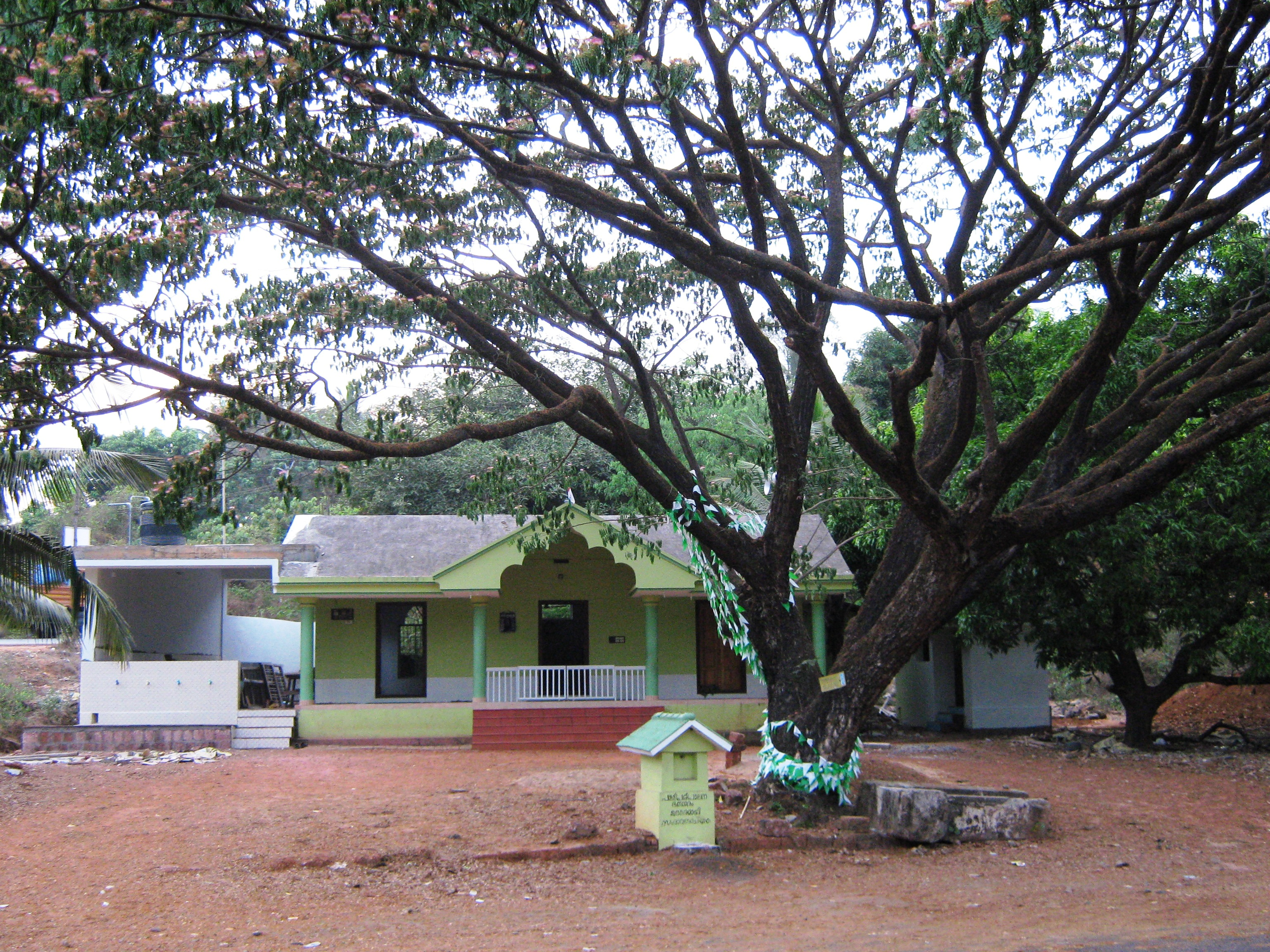
Hudha Masjidh, Bevincha

Chengala is a town in the Kasaragod district of Kerala, India. It is situated about 6 kilometres (3.7 mi) east of Kasaragod, between National Highway 66 and the Payaswini or Chandragiri River.

== Demographics ==
As of the 2011 Indian census, Chengala had a population of 15,588 with 7,698 males and 7,890 females, living in 2,791 households in an area of 9.07 square kilometres (3.50 sq mi).

== Major Organizations ==
- Zainab College, Cherkkala

== See also ==
- Kasaragod
- Kanhangad
- Cherkala
- Badiyadka
- Chattanchal
