= Thattummal =

Place in Kerala, India

Coordinates: 12°23′25″N 75°11′45″E

Thattummal is a place in Kasaragod District of Kerala, India. This town lies on SH 56 - the major road which connects Kanhangad and Panathur and has a limited bus stop. Thattummal is considered as the doorway to highrange areas of kanhangad

Panchayath	Kodom Belur Grama Panchayath
Village	Belur
Taluk	Vellarikundu
Post Office	thattummal PO, 670511
Bus Stop	Thattummal Bus stop

== Location ==
Thattummal lies in between of Kanhangad to Panathur state highway in Kasaragod district and is 16 km far from Kanhangad . Nearby towns are odayanchal and Iriya

== Educational institutions ==
- GHSS, Attenganam

Saraswathi Balamandir, Podavadukkam

GHS, Iriya
