= Panathur =

Town in Kerala

Panathur പാണത്തൂർ
- Town
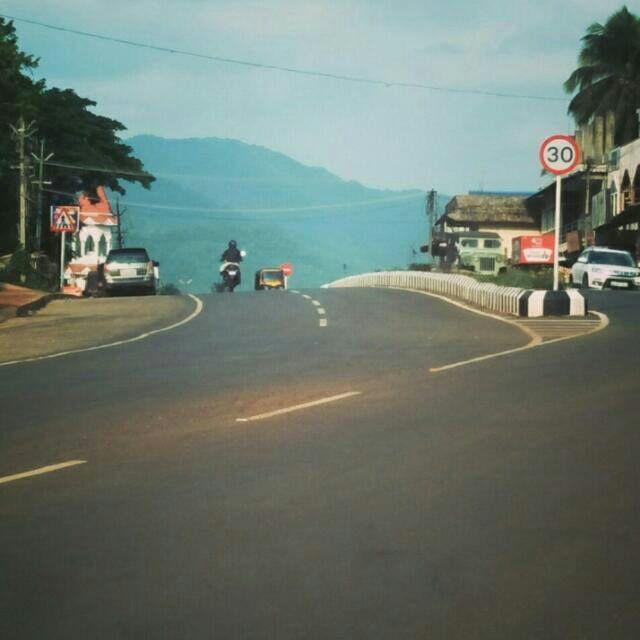
- Panathur town
- Nickname: Panathoor
- Location in Kerala, India Panathur (India)
- Coordinates: 12.457°N 75.355°E
- Country: India
- State: Kerala
- District: Kasargod
- Taluk: Vellarikundu

Population
  - Total: 12,000

Languages
  - Official: Malayalam, English
- Time zone: UTC+5:30 (IST)
- PIN: 671532
- STD code: 04997
- Vehicle registration: KL-79
- Nearest city: Kanhangad (42 km)

Panathur (Malayalam: പാണത്തൂർ; also romanised as Panathoor; pronounced [paːɳat̪t̪uːr]) is a town in Vellarikundu taluk of Kasaragod district in the Indian state of Kerala. It lies approximately 42 kilometres east of Kanhangad and about 53 kilometres from the district headquarters at Kasaragod. Panathur is situated approximately one kilometre from the Kerala-Karnataka state border and serves as an inland road gateway between the two states in northern Kasaragod district. The town is surrounded on three sides by forest reserves and cashew plantations, and the Kudumbur River flows adjacent to it.

== Geography ==
Panathur is located at 12°27′25″N 75°21′18″E, in the eastern hill-range zone of Kasaragod district, at an elevation of approximately 115 metres above sea level. The terrain slopes generally westward from the Western Ghats toward the coastal lowlands. According to the Directorate of Industries and Commerce, Government of Kerala, the hill ranges of the Western Ghats to the east of Panathur attain altitudes of over 1,000 metres, and the peak situated to the south of Panathur rises to 1,046 metres above mean sea level.

The town is enclosed on three sides by reserved forest and cashew plantations, producing rubber, arecanut, coconut, and pepper, among other agricultural commodities.

=== Rivers ===
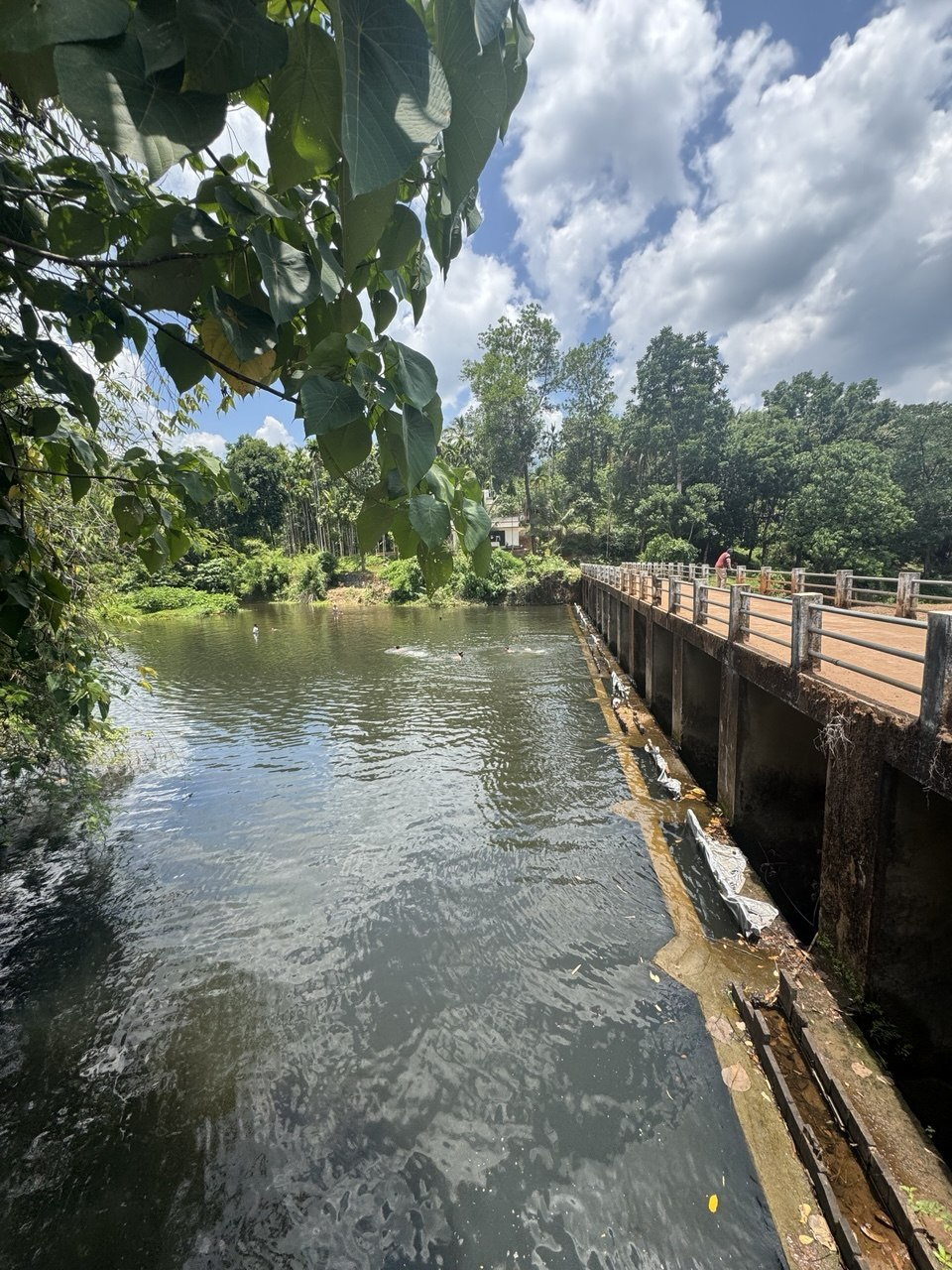
Check dam on the Kudumbur River at Puzhakkara Pananthur, Kerala, India

The Kudumbur River, the largest tributary of the Chandragiri River (also known as the Payaswini River in Karnataka), flows adjacent to Panathur. The Kudumbur originates in the Talakaveri Wildlife Sanctuary in the Western Ghats of Karnataka and crosses into Kerala in the vicinity of Panathur in Vellarikundu taluk, defining part of the Kerala - Karnataka state border in this locality before flowing westward. The Chandragiri is the longest river in Kasaragod district, stretching approximately 105 kilometres and ultimately draining into the Arabian Sea.

== Administration ==
Panathur falls within Vellarikundu taluk of Kasaragod district, Kerala. Kasaragod district is administered through four taluks; Kasaragod, Hosdurg, Vellarikundu, and Manjeshwaram each headed by a Tahsildar. Vellarikundu taluk was announced in the Kerala State Budget of 2013 and was formally inaugurated on 21 February 2014, having been carved out of the former Hosdurg taluk.

Panathur is part of the Kanhangad legislative assembly constituency and falls within the Kasaragod parliamentary constituency. The Panathady Panchayat administrative office and the local village office are situated in Panathur.

== Languages ==
Malayalam is the primary and official language. Other languages spoken in and around Panathur include Tulu, Beary Bashe, Kannada, Hindi and Marathi.

== Natural environment ==
The area around Panathur lies at the lower ranges of the Western Ghats, a globally recognised biodiversity hotspot. The Kasaragod district as a whole has been declared an organic district, and the highland zone around Panathur is characterised by cultivation of rubber, pepper, and coconut on the western slopes of the Ghats.

The Kasaragod District Handbook, published by the Government of Kerala, references a forest near Panathur, also known locally as Tulur Vanam (or Kekulom, meaning "the eastern place"), situated approximately four kilometres east of Panathur, as a natural picnic site within the district.

== Transport and accessibility ==
=== Road ===
Panathur is served by State Highway 56 (SH 56), maintained by the Kerala Public Works Department, which connects Kanhangad to the Karnataka border at Chemberi over a total length of 44.1 kilometres. The alignment passes through Eriya, Poodamkallu, Rajapuram, Kolichal, Panathur, and Chemberi. A road of approximately 20 kilometres also connects Panathur to Sullia in Dakshina Kannada, providing access onward toward Bengaluru and Mysuru.

=== Bus ===
The Kerala State Road Transport Corporation (KSRTC) operates bus services from Panathur to Kanhangad, Kasaragod, Mangaluru, and Kozhikode. The KSRTC Kanhangad depot operates a Fast Passenger service (Route RSC69) connecting Panathur to Kozhikode, a journey of approximately 200 kilometres via Kanhangad and Payyanur. Private bus operators also provide services along the Panathur–Kanhangad corridor.

=== Railway ===
There is no railway station within Panathur or its immediate vicinity. The nearest railway station is Kanhangad railway station (station code: KZE), which lies on the Shoranur–Mangalore line of the Southern Railway zone under the Palakkad railway division.

=== Air ===
The nearest airports are Mangalore International Airport (Bajpe), approximately 82 kilometres away, and Calicut International Airport, approximately 180 kilometres distant.

== Education ==
Panathur has educational institutions serving the surrounding area. Government schools, including GWHS Panathur (Government Welfare Higher Secondary School), are situated in the locality. The nearest higher education institutions are located in Kanhangad and Kasaragod.

== See also ==
- Panathur – Karike belt
- Ranipuram Hills
- Vellarikundu
- Kudumbur River
- Kanhangad
- Kasaragod district
