= Thekkil =

- Village
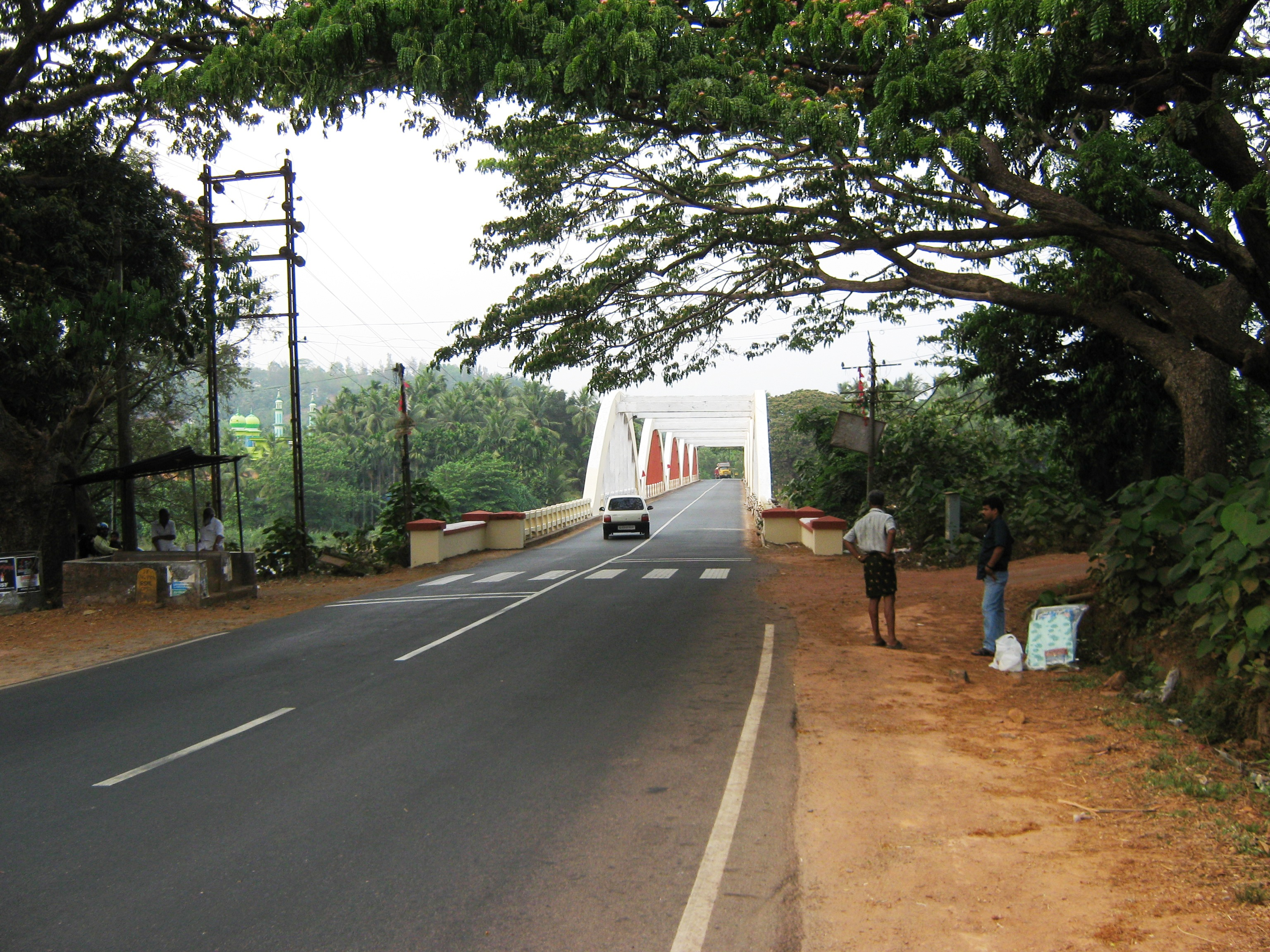
- Thekkil Bridge
- Country: India
- State: Kerala
- District: Kasaragod

Area
  - Total: 15.42 km^{2} (5.95 sq mi)

Population (2021)
  - Total: 14,303

Languages
  - Official: Malayalam, English
- Time zone: UTC+5:30 (IST)
- Vehicle registration: KL- 14

Thekkil is a village in the Kasaragod taluk of Kasaragod district, Kerala, India. It is located a few kilometres east of Kasaragod, south of the Chandragiri River and west of the Kudumbur River, along National Highway 66. It covers 15.42 square kilometres (5.95 sq mi).

Thekkil is also known for Chandragiri River.

== Demographics ==
As of 2011, Thekkil had a population of 14,299 people, of which 6,852 were male and 7,447 were female. 1,960 people, or about 13.7% of the population, were at or below the age of 6. The census reported 2,822 households in Thekkil.

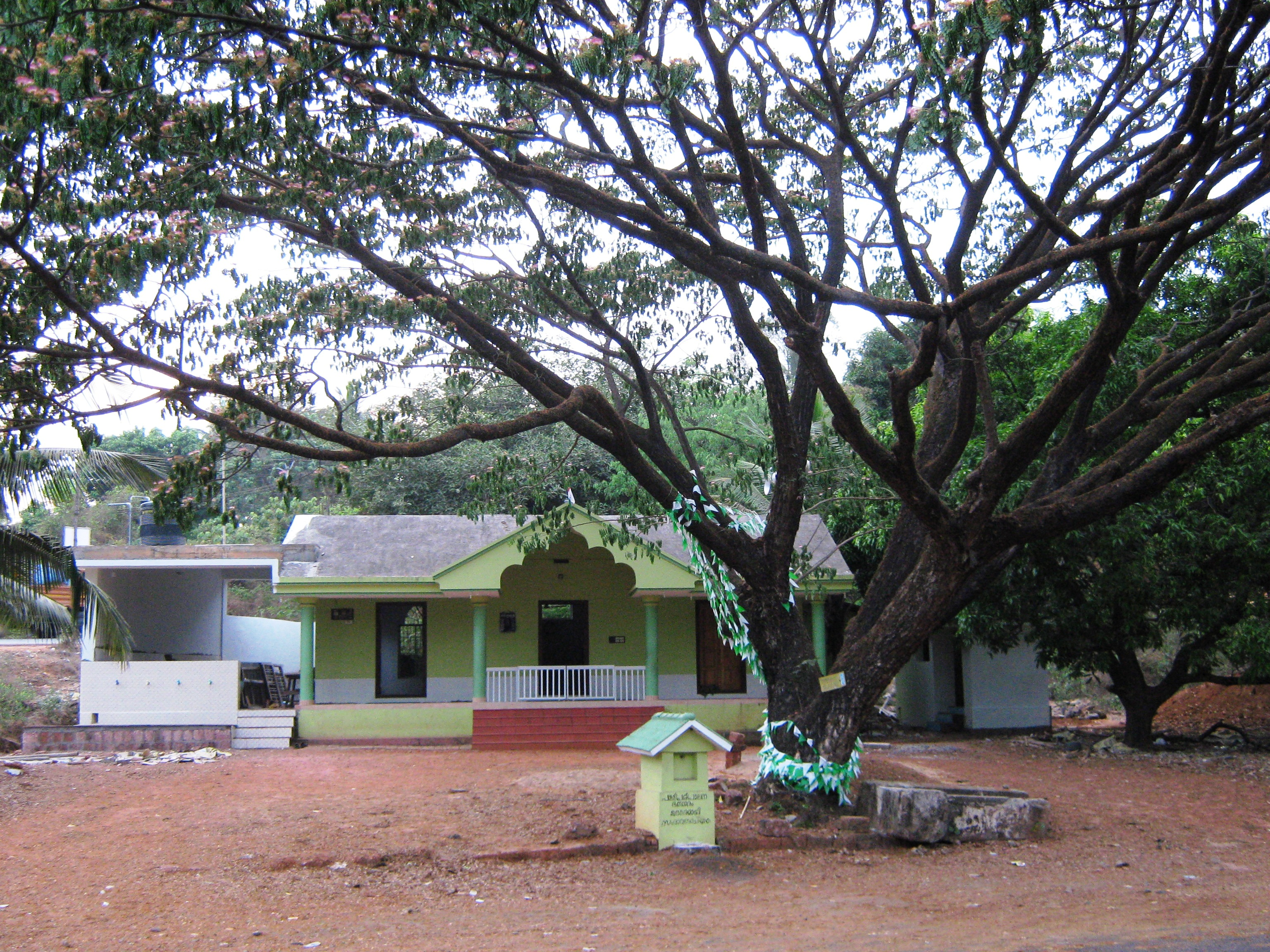
Hudha Mosque
