= Chemnad =

- Suburb
- Location in Kerala, India
- Coordinates: 12.499340°N 75.019010°E
- Country: India
- State: Kerala
- District: Kasaragod

Government
  - Type: Panchayat raj
  - Body: Chemnad Grama Panchayat

Area
  - Total: 8.3 km^{2} (3.2 sq mi)

Population (2011)
  - Total: 14,323
  - Density: 1,700/km^{2} (4,500/sq mi)

Languages
  - Official: Malayalam, English
- Time zone: UTC+5:30 (IST)
- PIN: 671317
- Telephone code: 04994
- Vehicle registration: KL-14
- Nearest city: Kasaragod (3 km)

Chemnad is a census town and gram panchayat in Kasaragod district in the Indian state of Kerala. It is also a suburb of Kasaragod city located 3 km (1.9 mi) southeast of it, across the Chandragiri River, and covers an area of 8.3 square kilometres (3.2 sq mi).

== Demographics ==
As of 2011, it had a population of 14,323 people, of which 6,662 were male and 7,661 were female. 2,029 residents, or about 14.2% of the population, were at or below the age of 6. The census reported a total of 2,747 households in Chemnad.
