= Thalangara =

- town
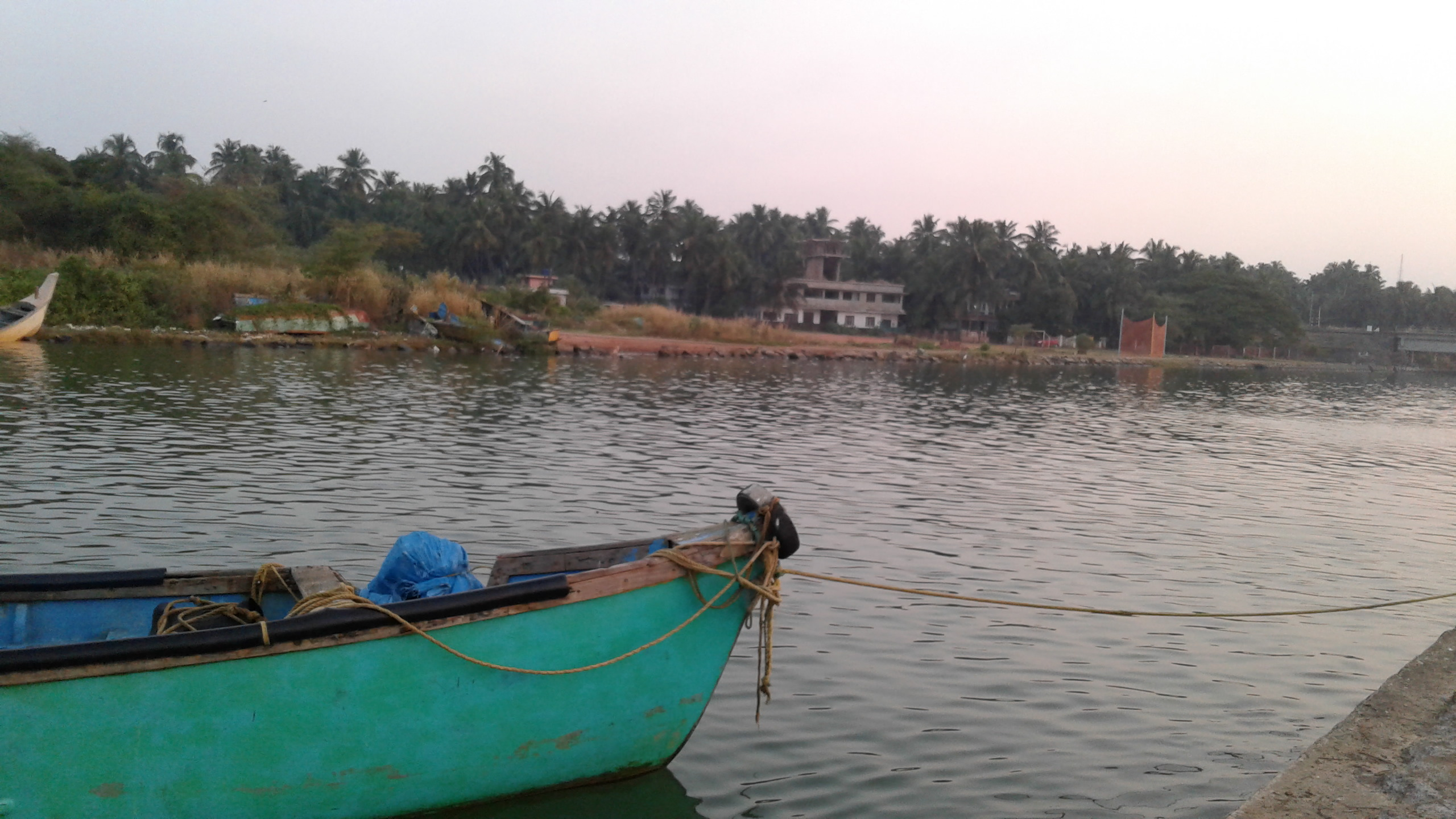
- Thalangara Estuary

- Location in Kerala, India
- Coordinates: 12°29′5″N 74°59′25″E
- Country: India
- State: Kerala
- District: Kasargod

Languages
  - Official: Malayalam, English
- Time zone: UTC+5:30 (IST)
- Telephone code: 04994 (671122-PIN)
- Vehicle registration: KL-14
- Climate: moderate (Köppen)
- Website: www.mythalangara.com

Thalangara is a part of Kasaragod Town, the district headquarters of the Kasaragod district in the South Indian state of Kerala. Malik Denar Juma Masjid and Dargah is located here. Its economy is dependent on remittance from expatriate workers in the Persian Gulf, particularly Dubai. Thalangara consists of areas like Padinhar, Kunnil, Kadavath, Khazilane, Nuppadamail, Bangod, Theruvath, and Korkode. The areas of Thalangara consist of smaller mohallas (localities) and each locality has its own mosque and madrassa.

Thalangara also houses the oldest and the biggest hospital in Kasargod district, the Malik Dinar Charitable Hospital, established in 1970 by Janab KS Abdullah. This institution is an educational centre of Kasaragod, with a School of Nursing, College of Nursing, B.Pharm. and D.Pharm. colleges.

== Malik Deenar ==
Malik Deenar (Arabic: مالك دينار) is said by Malabar Muslims to be the first generation follower of the Islamic prophet Muhammed who came to India to propagate Islam in the Indian subcontinent. His dargah is located at Thalangara which is consecrated inside a structure that was formerly a Tharavad of a local Tulu Chief.

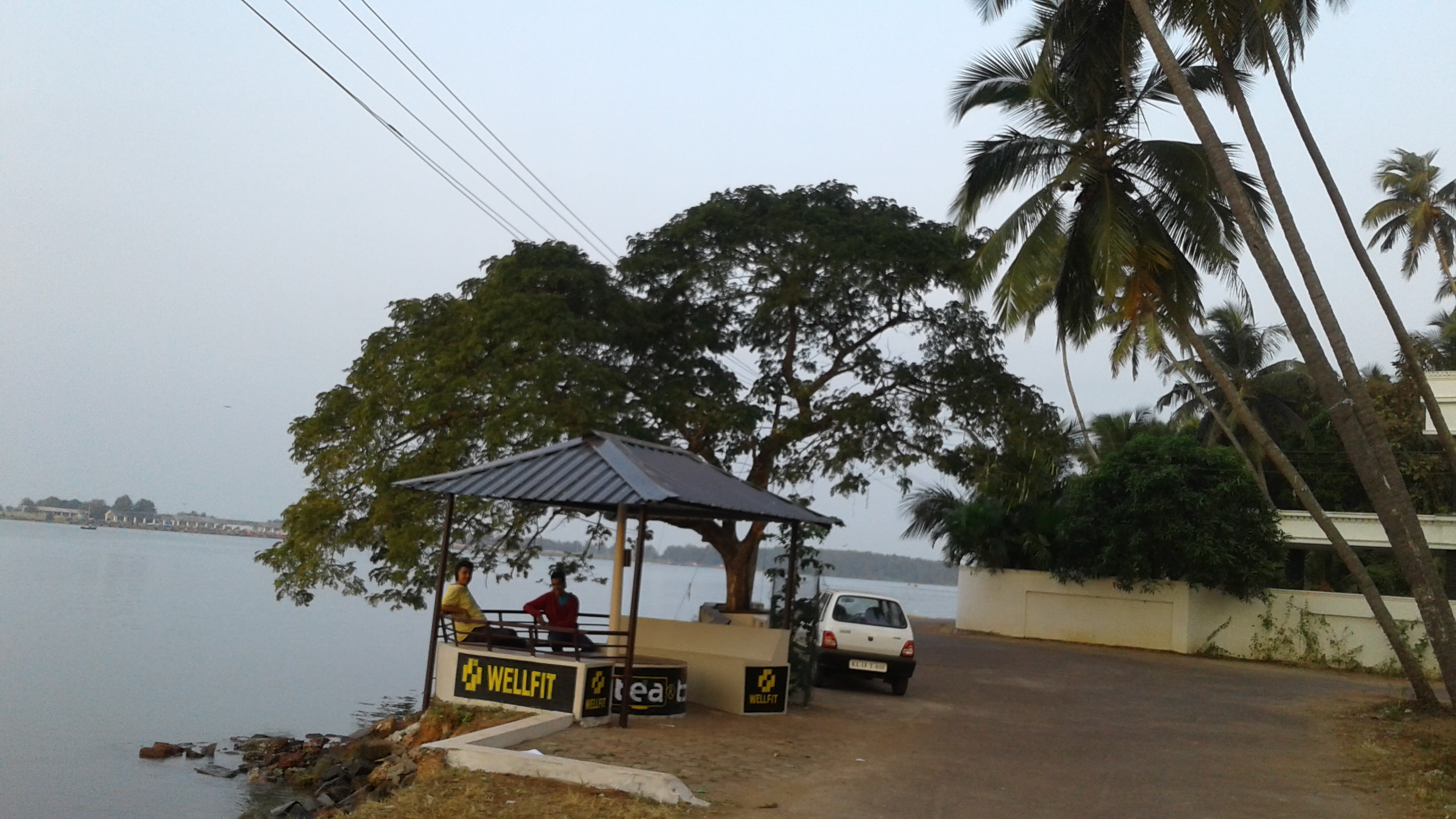
Ibrahim Khaleel Road

== Malik Deenar Jumma Masjid ==
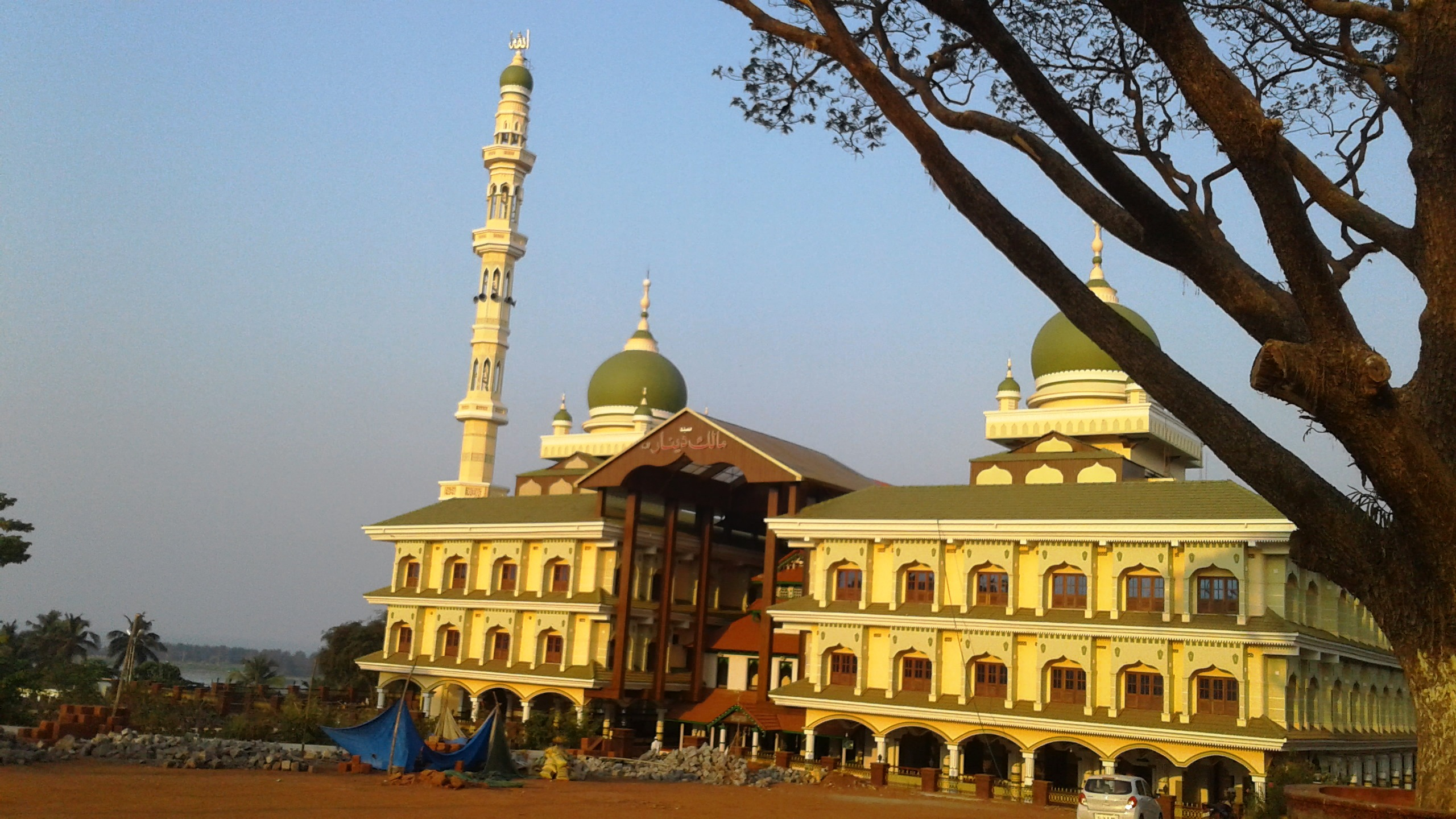
Malik Dinar Mosque

Malik Deenar Mosque, formally Malik Deenar Juma Masjid, is a mosque located about 3 kilometres from Kasaragod Town . The mosque is dedicated to Malik Deenar, who arrived from Arabia on a mission to spread Islam on the coast of Malabar. It was assumed to be initially built in c. 642 CE. The mosque was constructed in 1809; and in 2018, the mosque was re-renovated to its current form.

== Image gallery ==
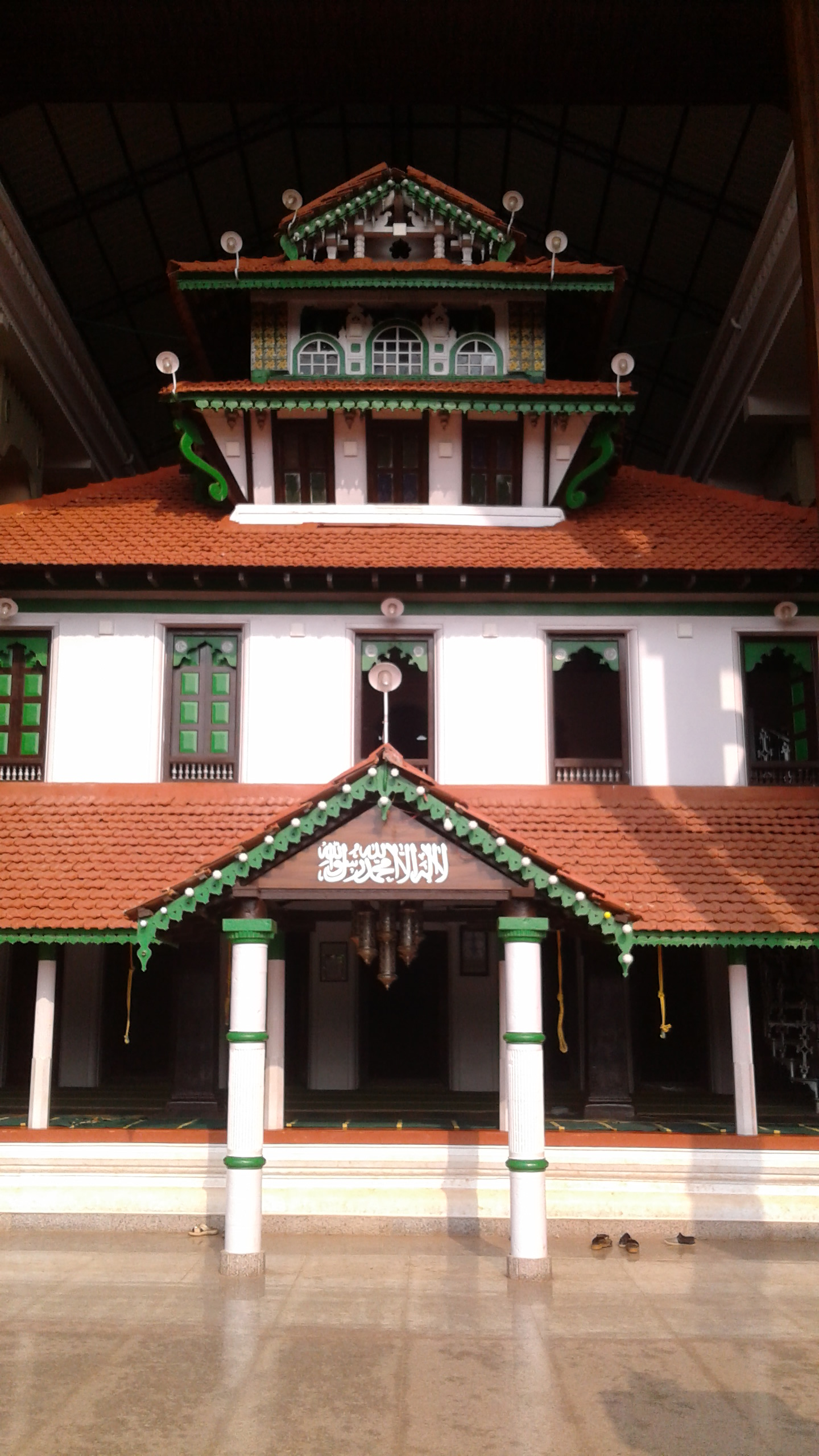
Malik Deenar Mosque

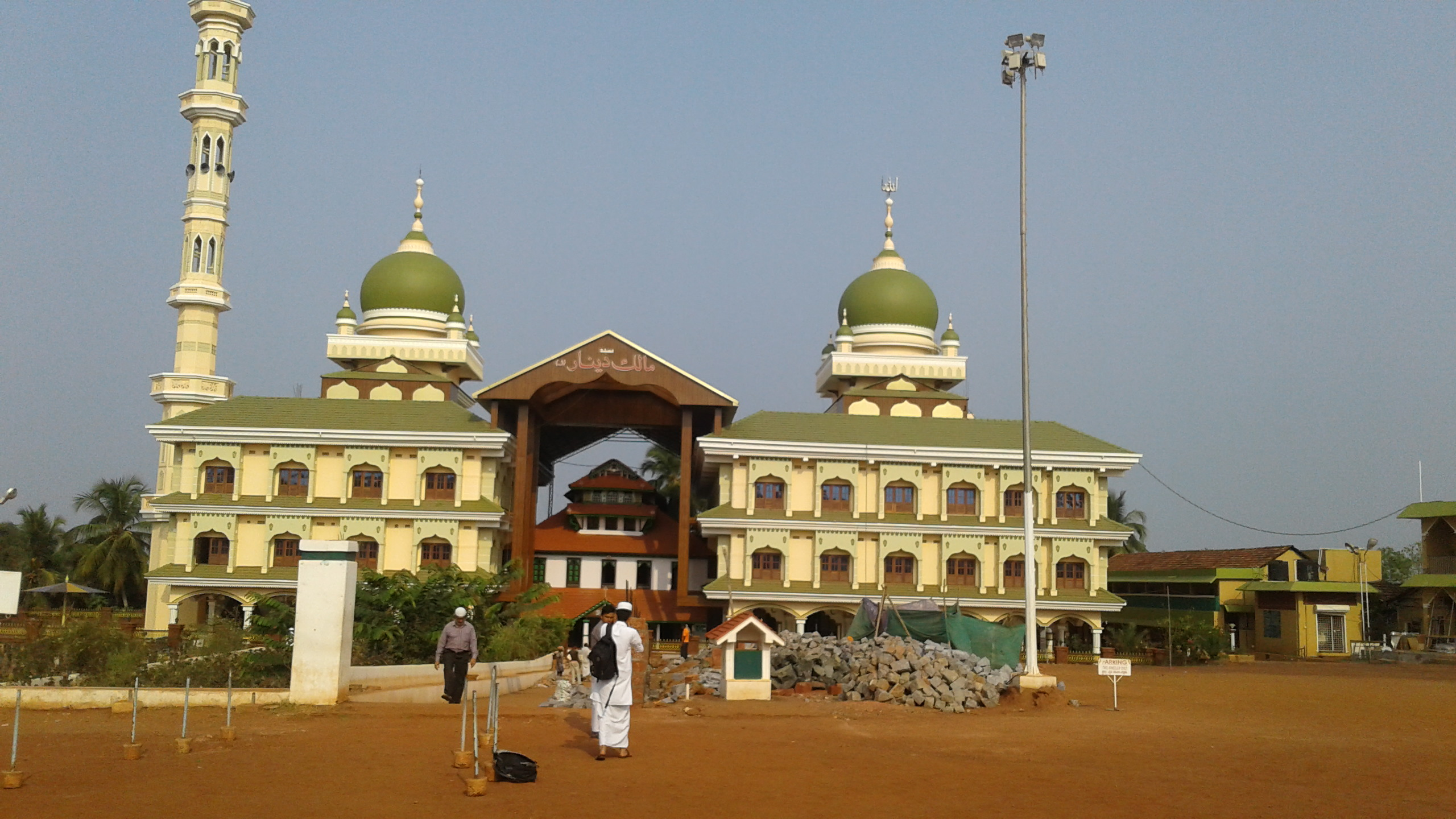
Malik Deenar Dargah

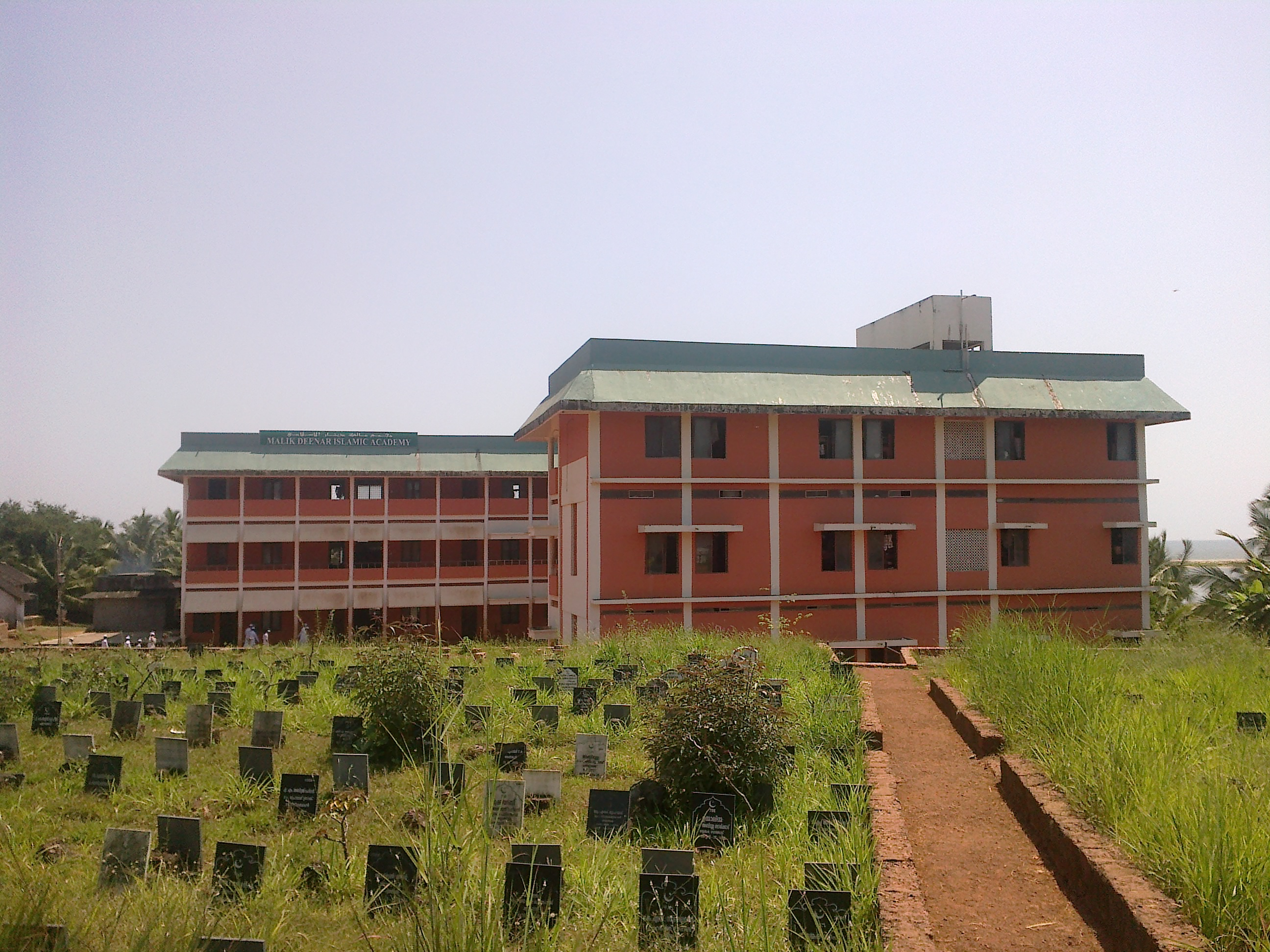
Malik Deenar Islamic Academy

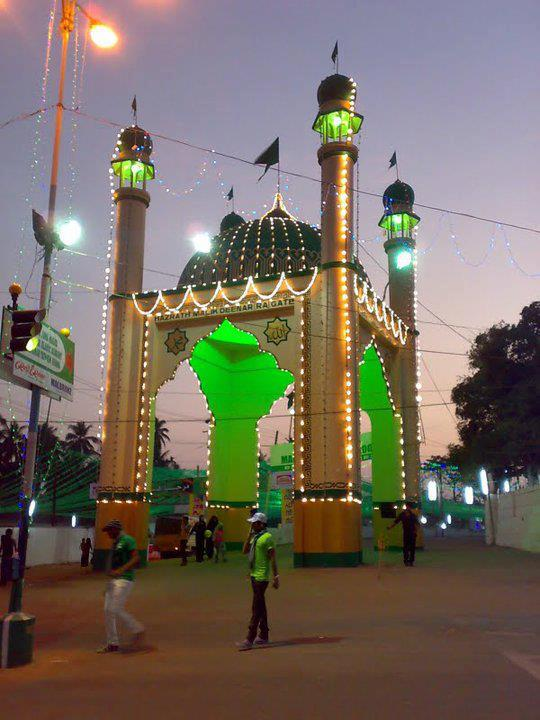
Malik Deenar Gate

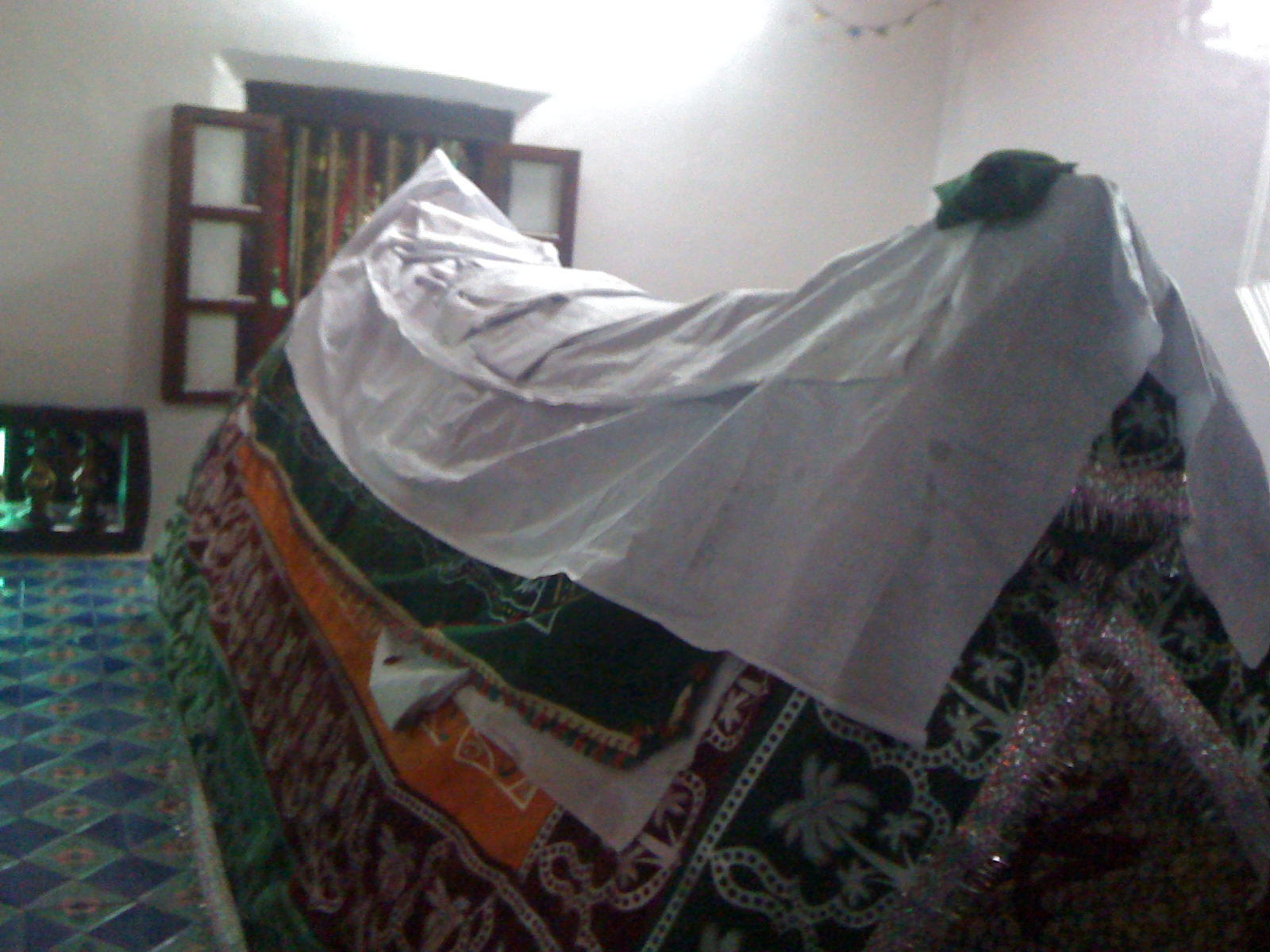
Inside Malik DeenarDargah
