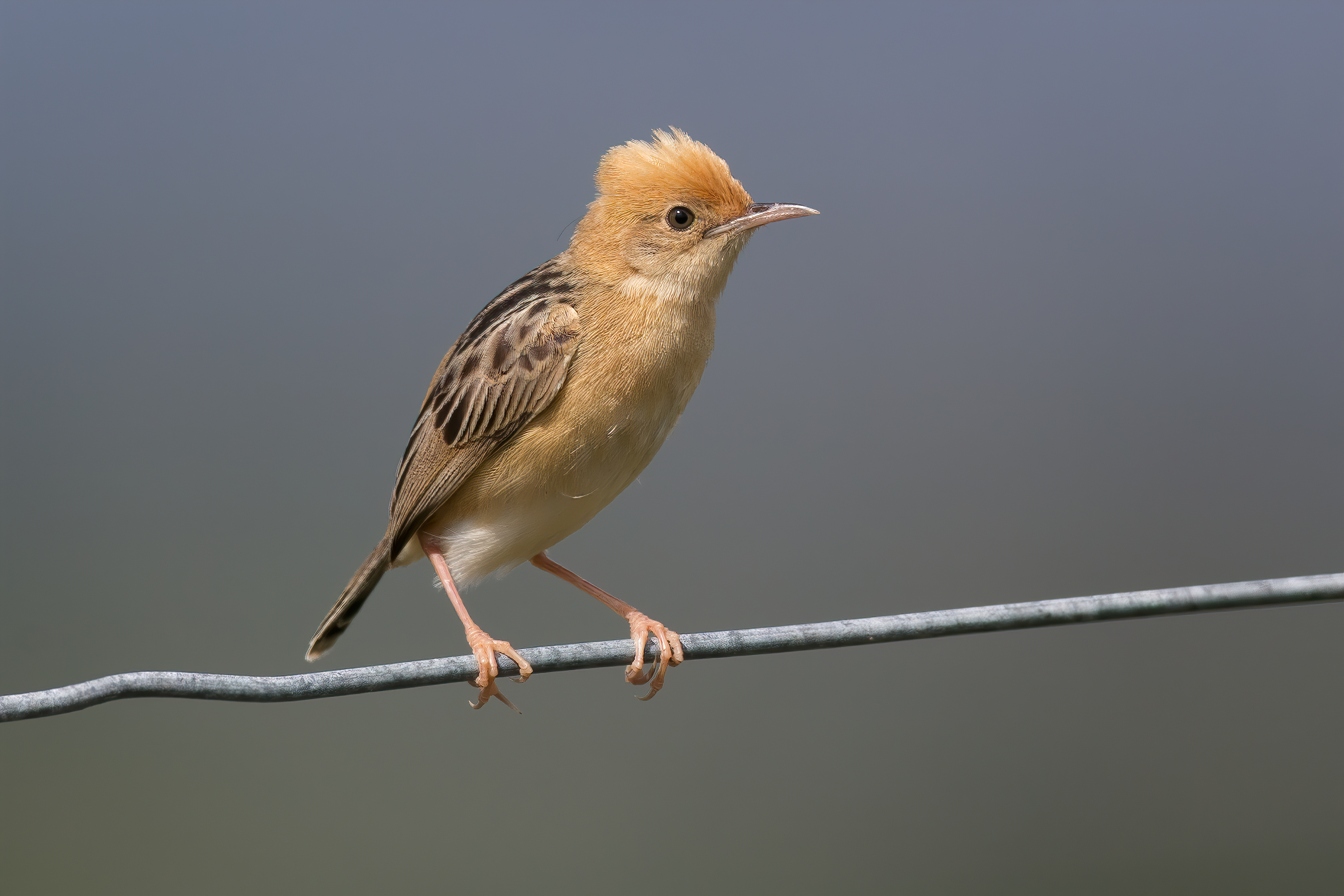
- Adult male during the breeding season
- Vocalization recorded in the Western Ghats, India

Conservation status
- Least Concern (IUCN 3.1)

Scientific classification
- Kingdom: Animalia
- Phylum: Chordata
- Class: Aves
- Order: Passeriformes
- Family: Cisticolidae
- Genus: Cisticola
- Species: C. exilis

Binomial name
- Cisticola exilis (Vigors & Horsfield, 1827)

Synonyms
- Malurus exilis (Vigors & Horsfield, 1827)

= Golden-headed cisticola =

Species of bird

The golden-headed cisticola (Cisticola exilis), also known as the bright-capped cisticola, is a species of warbler in the family Cisticolidae, found in Australia and thirteen Asian countries. Growing to 9–11.5 cm (3.5–4.5 in) long, it is usually brown and cream in colour, but has a different appearance during the mating season, with a gold-coloured body and a much shorter tail. It is an omnivore and frequently makes a variety of vocalizations. Known as the "finest tailor of all birds", it constructs nests out of plants and spider threads. It mates in the rainy season. It has a very large range and population, which is thought to be increasing.

== Taxonomy ==
The golden-headed cisticola was described by the naturalists Nicholas Vigors and Thomas Horsfield in 1827 and given the binomial name Malurus exilis. The specific epithet exilis is the Latin word for "small", "slender" or "thin". It is now placed in the genus Cisticola, which was erected by the German naturalist Johann Jakob Kaup in 1829. This species has been known by several English names in addition to the golden-headed cisticola, including bright-capped cisticola, bright-headed cisticola, bright-crowned cisticola, gold-capped cisticola, yellow-headed cisticola, exile warbler and fan-tail warbler. It has been called a tailorbird, but it is not closely related to Orthotomus, a genus containing 13 species known as tailorbirds.

Twelve subspecies are recognised:

- C. e. tytleri Jerdon, 1863 – south Nepal and northeast India to north Myanmar and southwest China
- C. e. erythrocephalus Blyth, 1851 – peninsular India
- C. e. equicaudatus Baker, E.C.S., 1924 – east Myanmar, Thailand and Indochina
- C. e. courtoisi La Touche, 1926 – south and east China
- C. e. volitans (R. Swinhoe, 1859) – Taiwan
- C. e. semirufus Cabanis, 1872 – Philippines and Sulu Archipelago
- C. e. rusticus Wallace, 1863 – Sulawesi and south Maluku Islands
- C. e. lineocapilla Gould, 1847 – Sumatra, southwest Borneo, Java, Lesser Sundas and northwest Australia
- C. e. diminutus Mathews, 1922 – New Guinea, islands in the Torres Strait and northeast Australia
- C. e. alexandrae Mathews, 1912 – inland north Australia
- C. e. exilis (Vigors & Horsfield, 1827) – east and southeast Australia
- C. e. polionotus Mayr, 1934 – Bismarck Archipelago

== Description ==
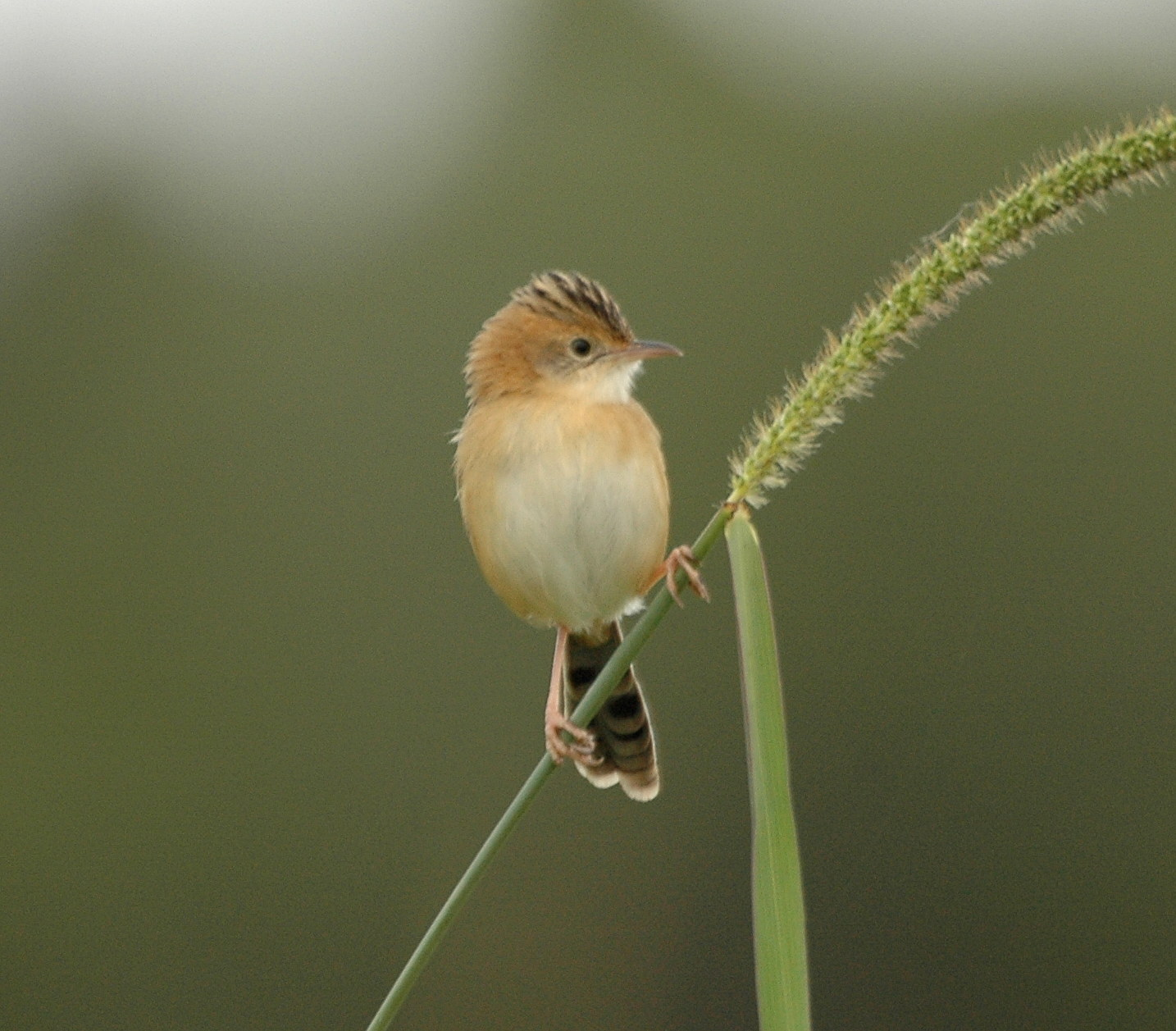
The golden-headed cisticola's cream-coloured underside

The golden-headed cisticola is a small species, growing to 9–11.5 cm (3.5–4.5 in) long and weighing 6–10 g (0.21–0.35 oz), with males slightly heavier than females. Although its appearance is similar to the black-backed cisticola (Cisticola eximius), the golden-headed cisticola has a shorter tail during the breeding season. The zitting cisticola (Cisticola juncidis) is also similar, but does not have the "rich golden" head of the golden-headed cisticola.

The male has several characteristics that are only present during the breeding season, including a golden body colour, a golden-orange head, and a dull chin. It also has a shorter tail; this may be a result of sexual selection as a shorter tail has been shown to improve male reproductive success. Females and males outside of the breeding season are similar in appearance, characterized by a cream-coloured underside and a brown upperside. They have streaks of black or dark brown on the upper part of their body, with black wings edged in buff, and a golden head. Their throat is white and the back of their neck is a dull shade of gold. Aside from being lighter in colour, juveniles are similar in appearance to adults. It produces a variety of sounds distinct from other birds, which, according to the Sunshine Coast Council, range from a "teewip" to a "wheezz, whit-whit". When vocalizing the species exhibits a crest on its head.

== Distribution and habitat ==
The golden-headed cisticola has a very large range and population, covering Australia, Cambodia, China, India, Indonesia, Lao People's Democratic Republic, Myanmar, Nepal, Papua New Guinea, Philippines, Taiwan, Thailand, Timor-Leste, and Vietnam. Its extent of occurrence is estimated to be 36,800,000 km^{2} (14,200,000 mi^{2}), and it is the most common species of cisticola in Australia and from India to the Philippines.

The species' habitat can be grassy hills, savannas, woodlands, scrublands, rivers, wetlands, or irrigated farmland, in areas where the grass is tall and thick. With the exception of the breeding season, the species mostly prefers to be near the ground. In Northern Australia, fires can occur in grasslands, causing it to sometimes live in forest edge habitats. According to the scientific journal BioLife, it lives at altitudes of 1,200 m (3,900 ft) or less, although the Handbook of the Birds of the World says that it can live up to 1,500 m (4,900 ft) in China and 1,800 m (5,900 ft) on the island of Lombok.

== Behaviour ==
An adult golden-headed cisticola vocalizing

The golden-headed cisticola is omnivorous, primarily eating invertebrates such as insects and small slugs, but also eating grass seeds. It typically forages on the ground for food, hiding from its prey among various plants, such as grass, and moving slowly. It usually inhabits a single place throughout its life, but habitat changes sometimes cause it to move to a different location. Records from New Guinea and Tasmania have shown it to be a wandering bird, and it possibly undergoes partial migration in China. It is often difficult to detect in the non-breeding season, which has made it difficult to analyse when it travels to different areas. It is most often found single or in small flocks, but outside of the breeding season groups can be larger.

=== Breeding ===
The golden-headed cisticola typically mates during the rainy season, which varies across countries. In Asia, the breeding season is in May–July in China, April–August in India, September–March in Moluccas and Sulawesi, December–March in New Guinea, and April–September in southeast Asia. It can breed any time of the year in north Australia, while it breeds from January to May in west Australia and October to April in east Australia. In southeast Australia, breeding usually occurs there in September–October, and its breeding plumage appears earlier, in July or August. The species can breed at other times of the year when rain is falling. It can be monogamous or polygamous, depending on the area. During the breeding season, males sometimes fly and vocalize for display. In these performances, the male "climbs vertically, spirals upwards to cruising height of about 50 m, circles for up to 5 minutes, singing, alternately fluttering and closing wings", and then steeply descends to just above the ground. It can repeat this practice immediately or fly to another part of its territory and then do so. The male defends its territory, which in Queensland, Australia, is 0.2–1.4 ha (0.5–3.5 acres).

The bird constructs its nests in shrubs, grass tussock, and other types of vegetation, no more than 3 m (10 ft) above the ground. They are built with green leaves, soft plant down, and grass, with the plants being used so that the nest is camouflaged. Described as the "finest tailor of all birds" for its nest-making, the species frequently stitches its nest together using spider threads. According to the Maitland Mercury, it constructs the nest by creating holes, "threading through cobweb silk", and lastly "pulling the construction together". The nests are built by both sexes, with the female stitching the nest together and the male giving spider-web threads to the female. They are round in shape with an entry on the side.

Three or four eggs are laid at a time, which are incubated by the female, taking 11 days. The rate of eggs that survive to hatch is 32%. After hatching, the female feeds the chicks and the male defends the nest, chasing away animals that come near it. Young remain in the nest for 11–13 days, during which time the female swallows their droppings.

== Status ==
Based on reports of its population in individual countries, the International Union for Conservation of Nature (IUCN) believes that the golden-headed cisticola's population is increasing globally. Its population density varies across regions – in most areas, about 2–6 birds are found in a single hectare, while in the Kimberley, Western Australia, as many as 27 birds can be in a hectare. Due to its wide range and increasing population, the IUCN Red List lists it as a species of least concern.

== Gallery ==
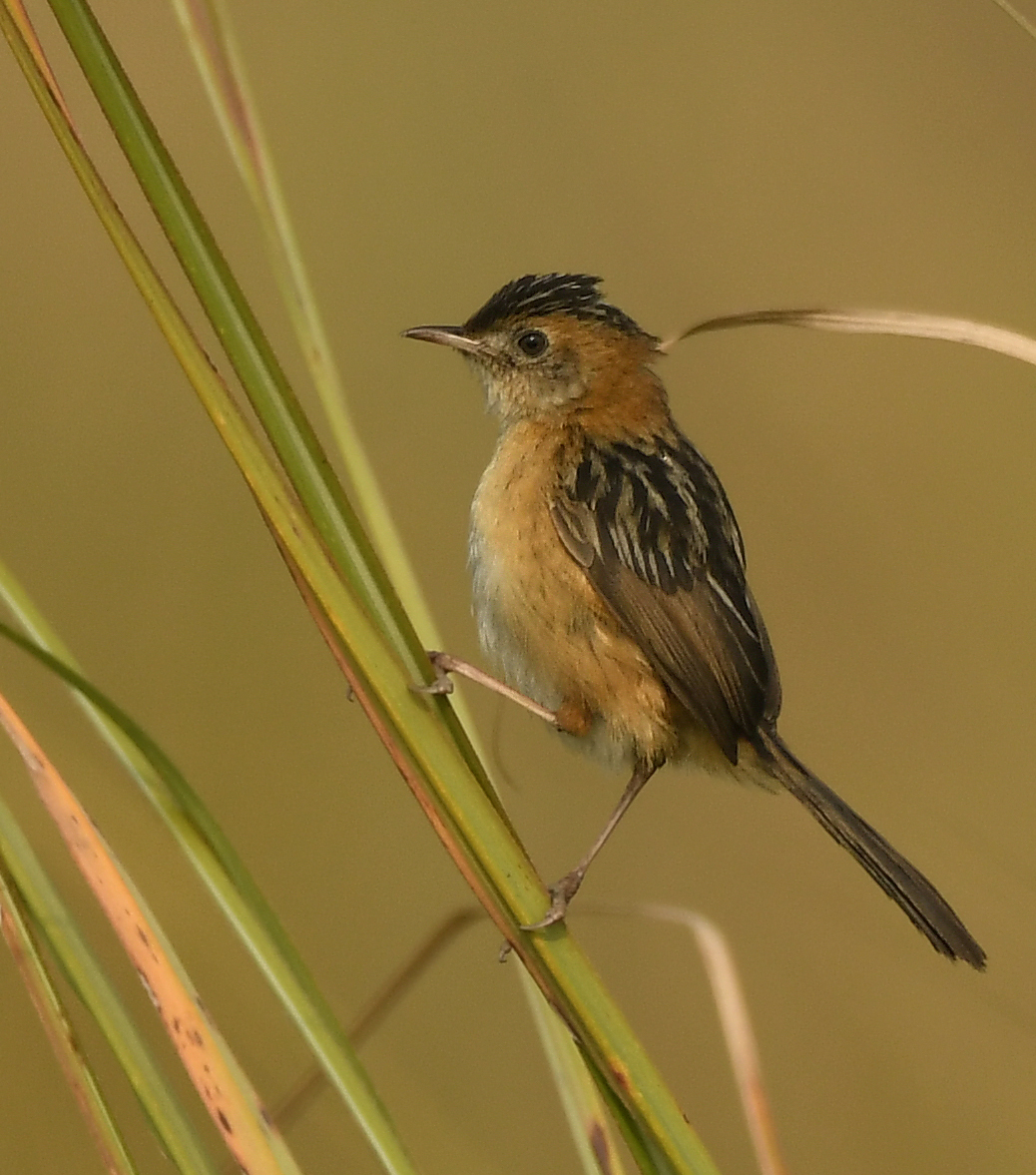
Golden-headed Cisticola (Cisticola exilis tytleri) at Manas National Park, Assam, India

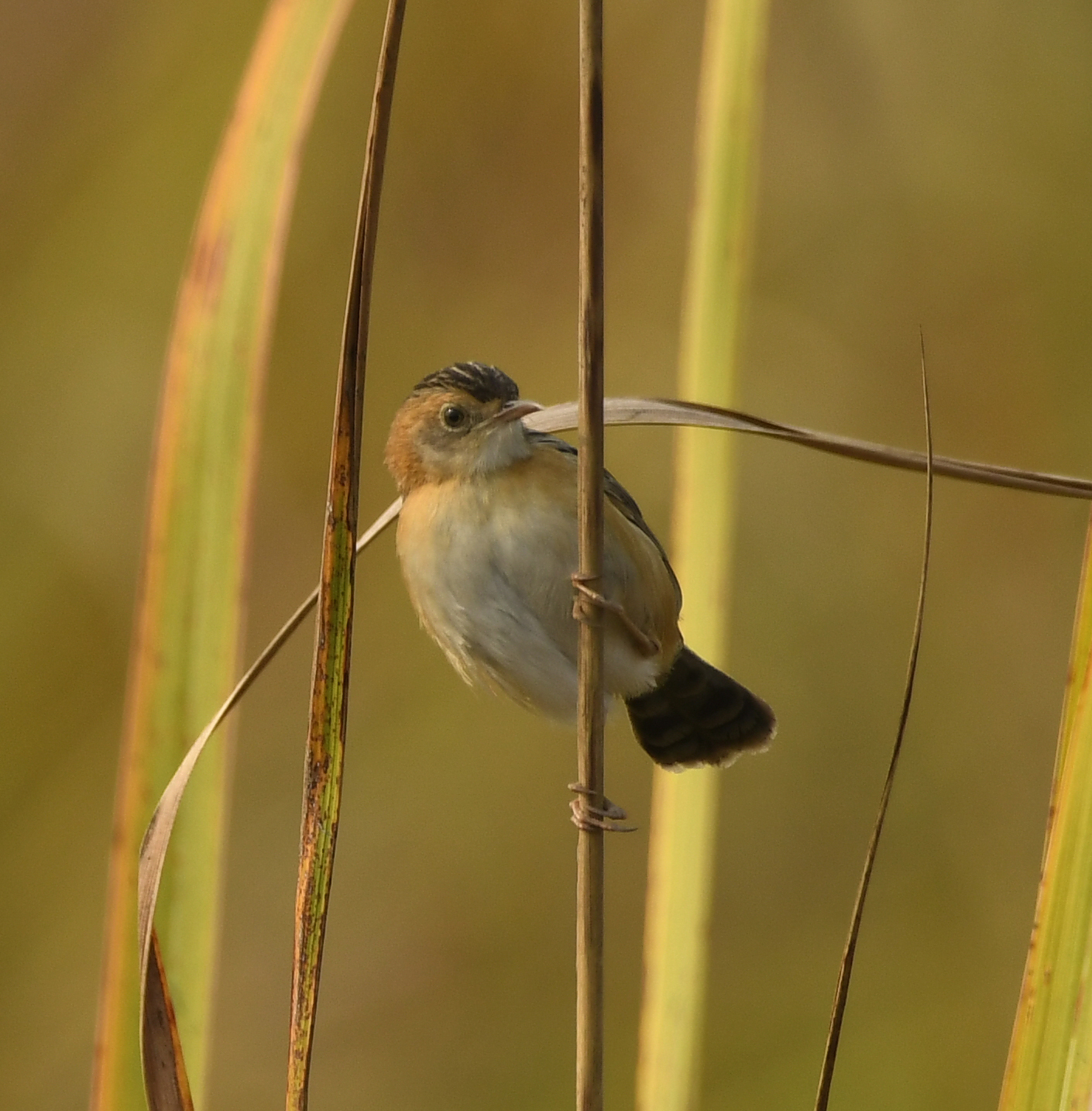
Golden-headed Cisticola (Cisticola exilis tytleri) at Manas National Park, Assam, India

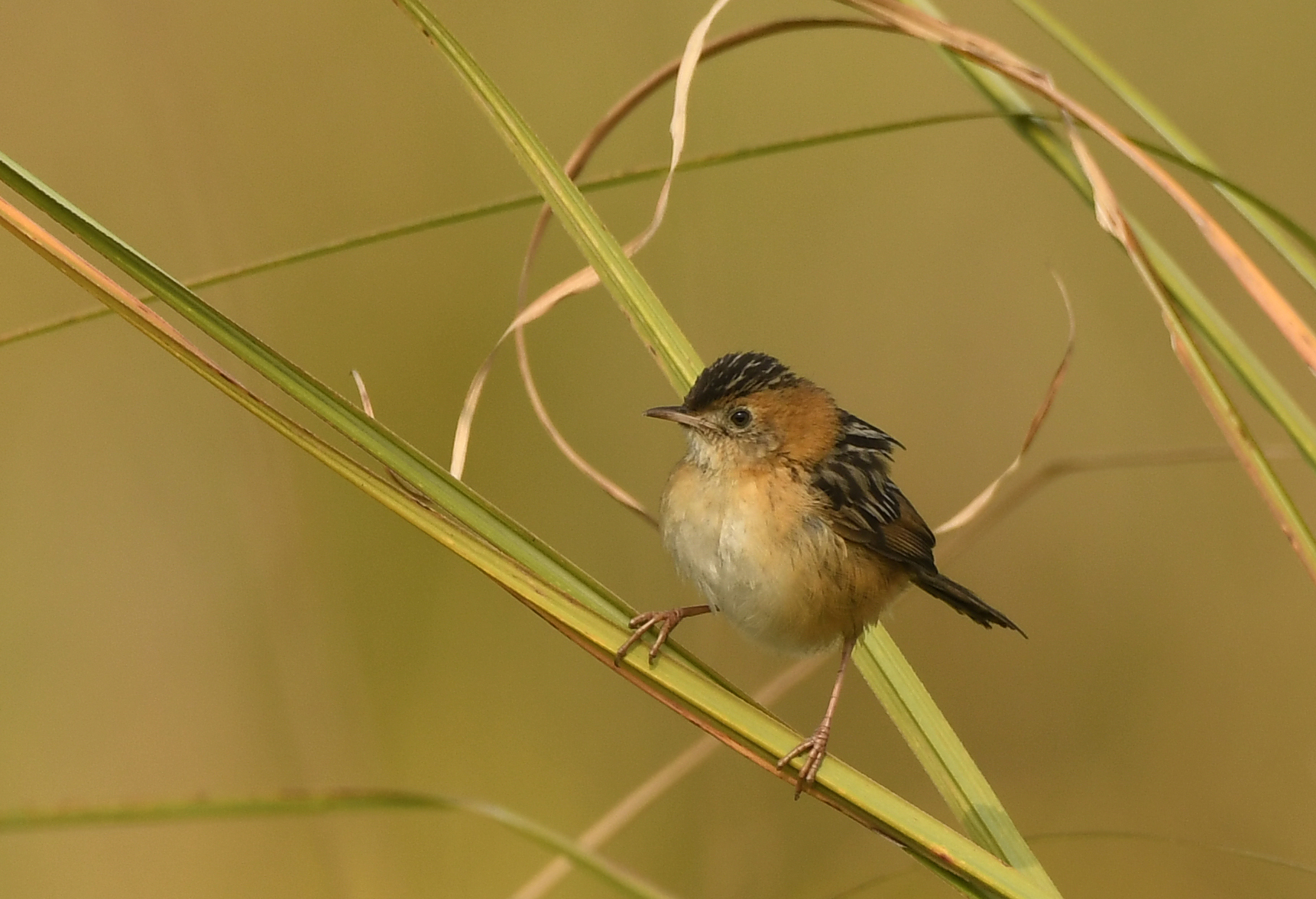
Golden-headed Cisticola (Cisticola exilis tytleri) at Manas National Park, Assam, India
