= Perumbala =

- village
- Location in Kerala, India
- Coordinates: 12°30′0″N 75°1′25″E
- Country: India
- State: Kerala
- District: Kasaragod

Government
  - Body: Chemnad Grama Panchayat

Area
  - Total: 7.92 km^{2} (3.06 sq mi)

Population (2011)
  - Total: 8,096
  - Density: 1,020/km^{2} (2,650/sq mi)

Languages
  - Official: Malayalam, English
- Time zone: UTC+5:30 (IST)
- PIN: 671317
- Vehicle registration: KL-14

Perumbala is a village in Chemnad Panchayat Kasaragod district in the state of Kerala, India. Perumbala is a small village located in Kasaragod taluk of Kasaragod district in Kerala with total 1,677 families residing. The population of the village is 8,096, 3,789 of them are males and 4,307 are females according to the 2011 Indian Census. It is located 7 km (4.3 mi) south east of Kasaragod town, 60 km (37 mi) south of Mangalore city and 24 km (15 mi) north of Bekal Fort.

== Demographics ==
As of 2011 India census, Perumbala had a population of 8096 with 3789 males and 4307 females.
