= Ranipuram Hills =

Hill station in Kasaragod district, Kerala, India

Ranipuram hill station റാണിപുരം
- Hill station and ecotourism destination
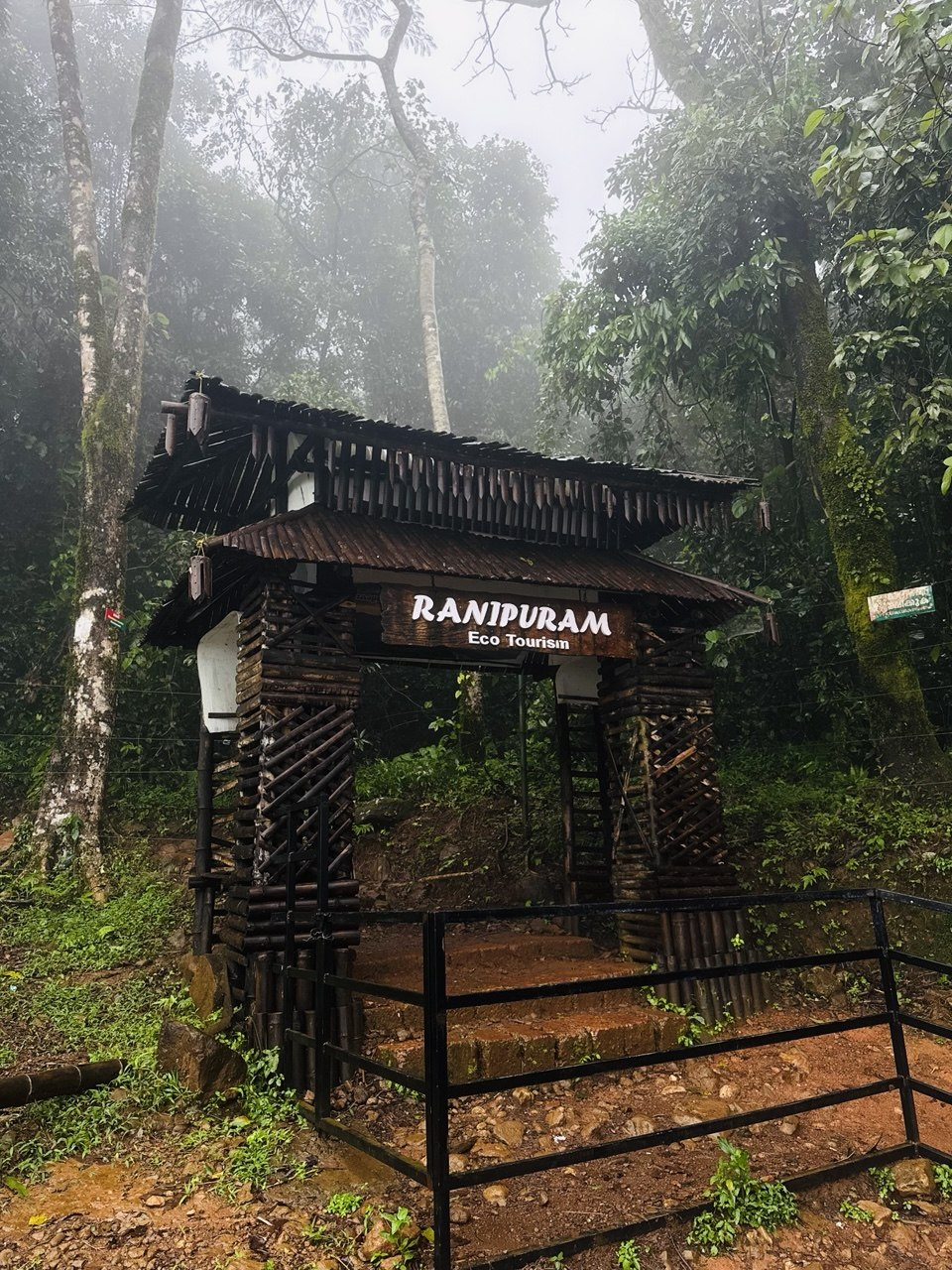
- Entrance structure marking the eco tourism trekking area at Ranipuram

- Location within Kerala
- Coordinates: 12°31′N 75°20′E
- Country: India
- State: Kerala
- District: Kasaragod
- Taluk: Vellarikundu
- Panchayat: Panathady

Government
  - Body: Kerala Forest Department / DTPC Kasaragod
- (base level); peak at 1,048 m
- Elevation: 750 m (2,460 ft)

Ranipuram hill station (റാണിപുരം, Malayalam pronunciation: [rɑːɳipuɾəm]) is a scenic hill station and ecotourism destination located in the Panathady panchayat of Vellarikundu taluk, Kasaragod district, Kerala, India. Formerly known as Madathumala (മാടത്തുമല), it stands at a base elevation of approximately 750 metres (2,460 ft) above sea level, with its summit peak reaching 1,048 metres (3,438 ft), making it the highest point in Kasaragod district.

Situated on the Western Ghats, near the Kerala–Karnataka border, Ranipuram hill station is part of a contiguous forest belt that merges with the Talacauvery Wildlife Sanctuary and the Coorg mountains of Karnataka. The area is popularly referred to as the Ooty of Kerala owing to its cool climate, lush meadows, and undulating green hills, which are said to be reminiscent of Ooty in the Nilgiri Hills.

It is among the smallest hill stations in Kerala and is administered as an ecotourism destination by the Kerala Forest Department.

== Name ==
The area was historically known as Madathumala (മാടത്തുമല), a toponym describing its characteristic undulating terrain. In the 1970s, the land was acquired by the Catholic Diocese of Kottayam for the resettlement of Knanaya Catholic families from central Kerala.

The settlers renamed the location Ranipuram to honour the Virgin Mary (often referred to as the "Queen of Heaven"), reflecting the community's Marian devotion. In modern tourism literature, the name is also frequently interpreted as "Abode of the Queen [of grasslands]," a reference to the expansive shola meadows found at the summit.

In contemporary tourism literature, the name is frequently interpreted as "Abode of the Queen of Grasslands," referring to the extensive shola meadows found at the summit.

== Geography and location ==
Ranipuram is located approximately 43 km (27 mi) east of Kanhangad and about 85 km (53 mi) from Kasaragod town, within the Panathady panchayat of Vellarikundu taluk. It lies adjacent to the Kottancheri Hills and the Talacauvery mountain range, which straddles the Kerala–Karnataka border. The base camp of the hill station, from which trekking trails depart, is situated about 9 km (5.6 mi) uphill from Panathady.

The hills form part of the South Western Ghats moist deciduous forests ecoregion and are contiguous with the reserve forests of Panathady, Eleri, and Konnakad. The forests here merge seamlessly with those of the Coorg highlands in Karnataka, making the landscape a shared ecological corridor.

=== Climate ===
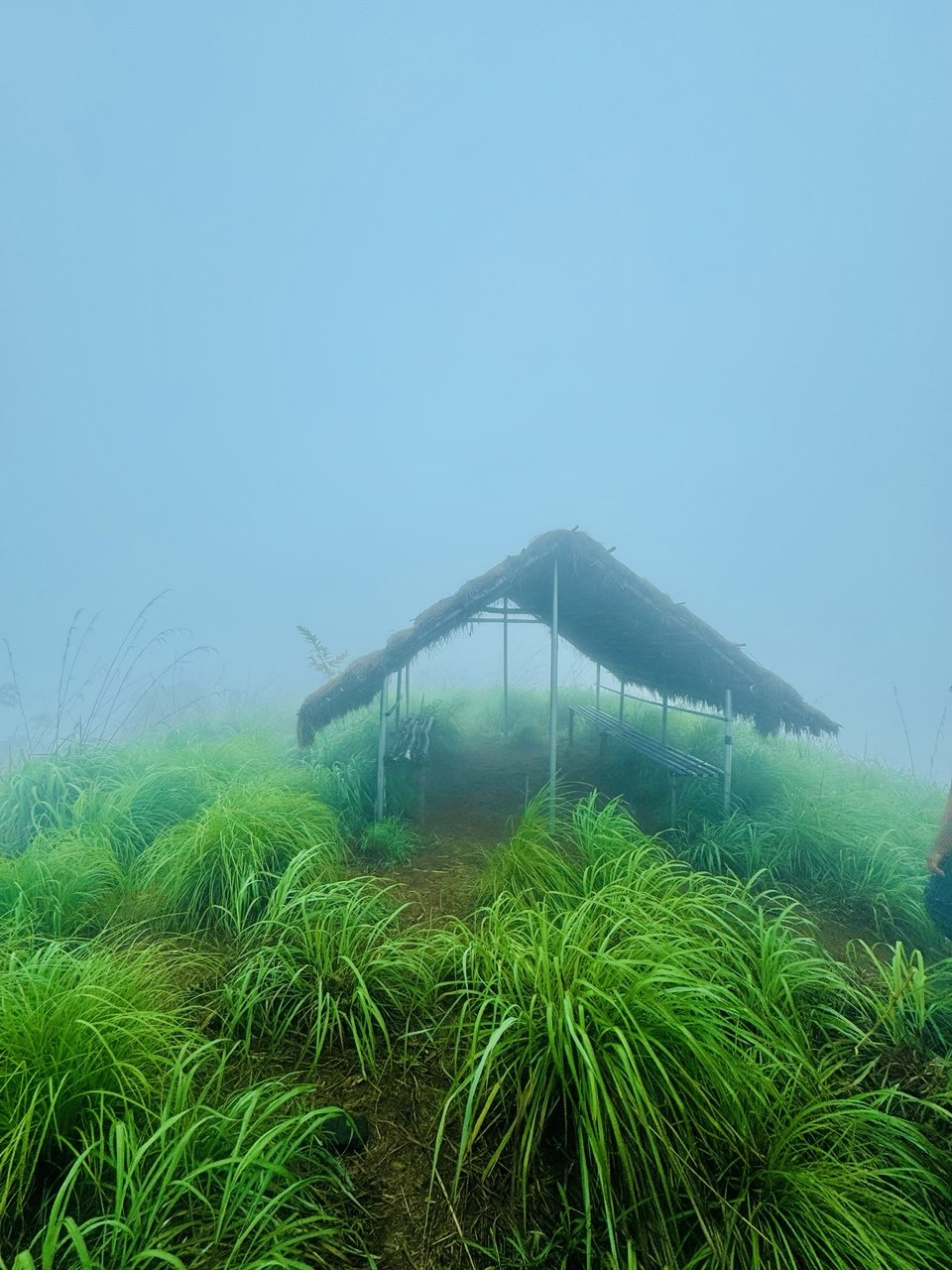
A small shelter surrounded by grassland under heavy fog near the upper trekking area of Ranipuram

The climate at Ranipuram is characterised by cool, moist conditions throughout most of the year. During summer, temperatures range between approximately 22 and 45 °C (72 and 113 °F), while during winter they drop to between 12 and 33 °C (54 and 91 °F). The southwestern monsoon brings heavy rainfall between June and September, during which access can become difficult due to slippery terrain and leeches. The most favourable period for visitors is from October to March, when the weather is pleasant and suitable for trekking.

== History ==
The area now known as Ranipuram was settled in organised waves from the 1970s onwards. The Catholic Diocese of Kottayam acquired land here as part of a broader effort to resettle Knanaya Catholic families from central Kerala, who were facing land scarcity in their home region. The early settlements comprised migrant families who cleared portions of the forest for rubber and spice cultivation, particularly black pepper and cardamom. Despite the settlement history, pre-existing cultural traditions of the indigenous population remain active; the Theyyam ritual a ritualistic dance performance common in the North Malabar region is observed annually during the month of May at local shrines in the vicinity.

A significant portion of the resident population in the surrounding areas belongs to the Marathi community. These residents are descendants of historical migrations from the northern Konkan and Maharashtra regions to the highland tracts of the Western Ghats. The Marathi-speaking population in Kasaragod is primarily concentrated in the hilly taluks of Vellarikundu and Hosdurg.

== Flora and fauna ==
Ranipuram and its surrounding forests constitute a recognised biodiversity hotspot within the Western Ghats, a UNESCO World Heritage natural site.

=== Vegetation ===
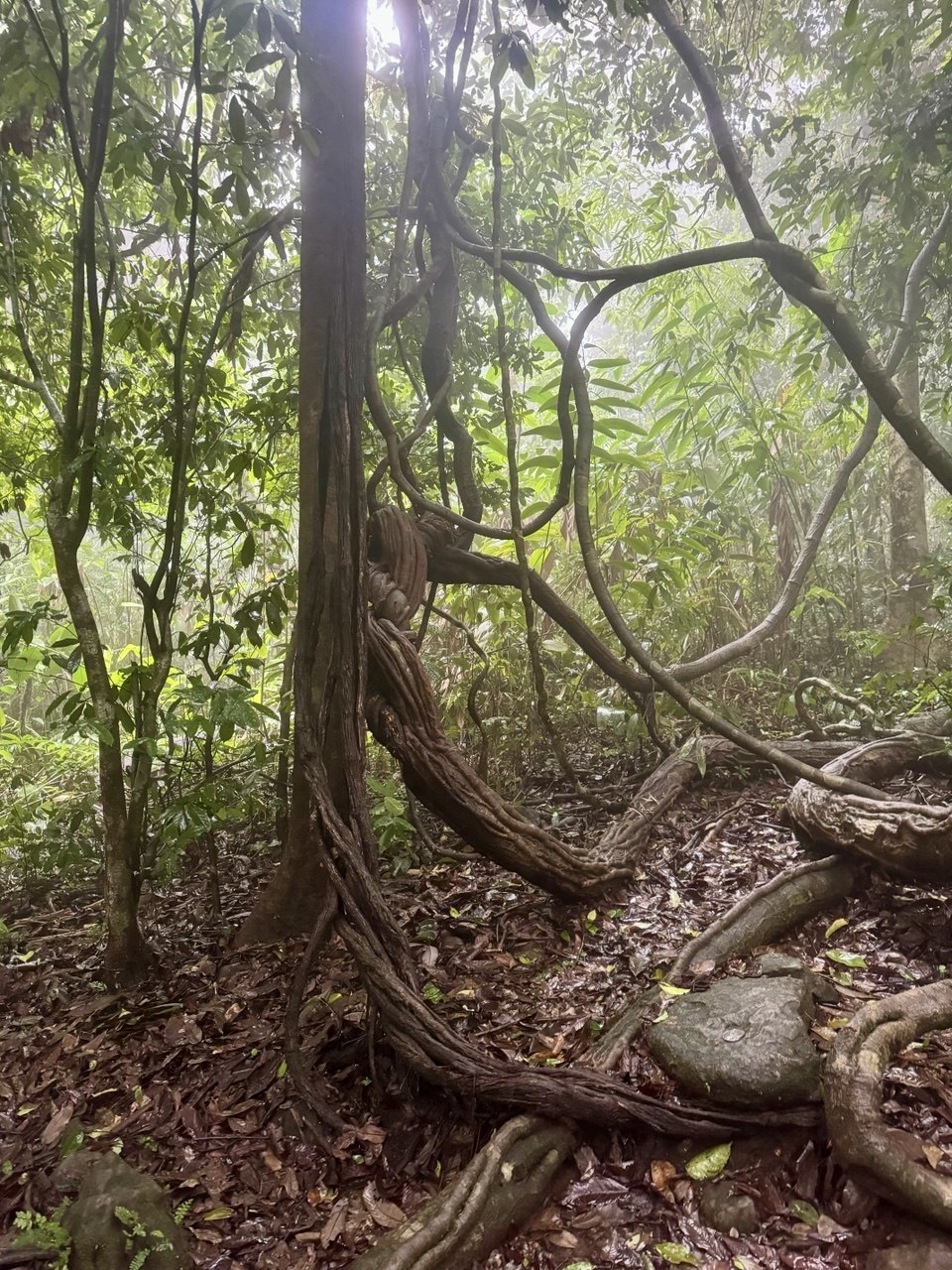
A large woody vine (liana) coiled around a tree trunk inside the forest at Ranipuram

The forests feature a combination of evergreen shola forests, grasslands, moors, and monsoon forests. Sholas patches of stunted evergreen tropical broadleaf forest found in valley floors amid rolling grasslands are a characteristic and ecologically significant vegetation type found here, and Ranipuram is noted as the only location within Kasaragod district where shola forests are present. The meadows are dominated by lemongrass (Cymbopogon spp.), which is said to impart a medicinal quality to the breeze. Rare orchids, wildflowers, and a variety of medicinal plants are also reported from the area.

=== Mammals ===
The forests support a diverse mammal fauna. Confirmed or regularly observed species include:

- Indian elephant (Elephas maximus)
- Leopard (Panthera pardus)
- leopard cat (Prionailurus bengalensis)
- Slender loris (Loris tardigradus)
- Malabar giant squirrel (Ratufa indica)
- Indian giant flying squirrel (Petaurista philippensis)
- Malabar civet (Viverra civettina)
- Jungle cat (Felis chaus)
- Wild boar (Sus scrofa)
- Sambar deer (Rusa unicolor)
- Bonnet macaque (Macaca radiata)
- Indian porcupine (Hystrix indica)
- Gaur (Bos gaurus)

Wild elephants are commonly sighted, particularly during the summer months, when they descend from the higher elevations.

=== Birds ===
Ranipuram is considered a significant location for birdwatching. A bird survey conducted in the area documented 98 species of birds. Notable species recorded include:

- Indian black eagle (Ictinaetus malaiensis)
- Crested serpent eagle (Spilornis cheela)
- Little spiderhunter (Arachnothera longirostra)
- Indian paradise flycatcher (Terpsiphone paradisi)
- Malabar grey hornbill (Ocyceros griseus)
- Great hornbill (Buceros bicornis)
- Malabar trogon (Harpactes fasciatus)
- Sri Lanka green pigeon (Treron pompadora)
- White-bellied treepie (Dendrocitta leucogastra)
- Crimson-backed sunbird (Leptocoma minima)
- Golden-headed cisticola (Cisticola exilis)

The golden-headed cisticola (Cisticola exilis) a bird typically associated with high-altitude grasslands has been recorded at Ranipuram, which is noted as one of the few high altitude habitats for this species in northern Kerala. Its presence is significant as it highlights the unique montane grassland ecosystem of the peak, which mimics the bird's typical habitats in the southern Western Ghats.

=== Reptiles and amphibians ===
The Ranipuram mountain range and its surrounding reserve forests support a variety of herpetofauna typical of the southern Western Ghats. Recorded reptilian species include the king cobra (Ophiophagus hannah), Indian cobra (Naja naja), common krait (Bungarus caeruleus), and Russell's viper (Daboia russelii). The Bengal monitor (Varanus bengalensis) is also frequently sighted in the lower shola fringes.

The region's high humidity and perennial streams provide a habitat for numerous amphibians, with approximately 19 species documented in local biodiversity registers. Notable sightings include various species of tree frogs and the Malabar gliding frog (Rhacophorus malabaricus), which is endemic to the Western Ghats.

=== Insects ===
The forest ecosystem around the hills is home to over 100 species of butterflies, including several species endemic to the Western Ghats. Notable sightings include the Malabar banded swallowtail (Papilio liomedon) and the Southern birdwing (Troides minos), which is the largest butterfly in India. The high-altitude grasslands also support various species of odonates and grasshoppers unique to the shola grassland complex.

== Trekking ==
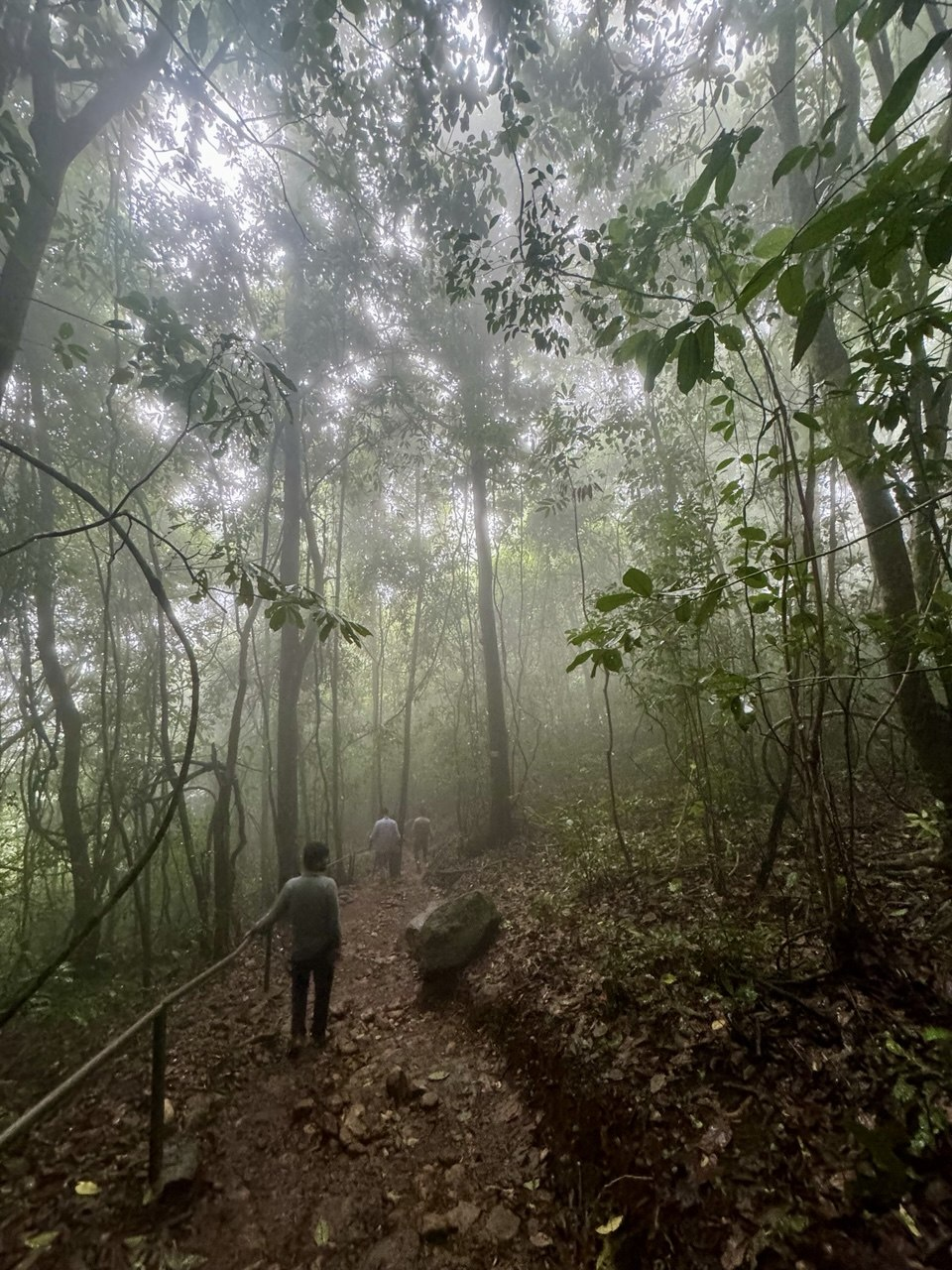
A trekking path through mist covered evergreen forest in Ranipuram Hillstation

Trekking is the principal activity at Ranipuram and is managed by the Kerala Forest Department, which operates a ticket counter at the entry point. There are two main trekking routes that wind through the South Western Ghats moist forests, with sections of stone-cut steps to assist climbers. The combined return trek covers approximately 5 km.

Trekking entry is permitted from early morning until 15:00 (3:00 pm), after which the forest guards require all visitors to descend by 17:00 (5:00 pm). The trail ascends from the forest rest house through dense canopy forest before opening onto extensive shola grasslands and panoramic hilltop viewpoints. Visitors are advised to wear sturdy, grip-soled footwear and to carry salt as a precaution against leeches, which are especially prevalent during the monsoon season.

== Conservation status ==
There has been a longstanding proposal to formally declare the Ranipuram forests as a wildlife sanctuary. The proposed Ranipuram Wildlife Sanctuary would encompass the Ranipuram forest along with the adjacent Panathady, Eleri, and Konnakad reserve forests. Such a designation would make it contiguous with the Talacauvery Wildlife Sanctuary in Karnataka, creating an expanded protected corridor across the state border.

The Kerala Tourism Department has noted that formal wildlife sanctuary status would better safeguard the area's biodiversity and would enhance its potential as an ecotourism destination.

== Accommodation ==
Accommodation at the base of the hill station is provided by the District Tourism Promotion Councils (DTPC), Kasaragod, which maintains tourist cottages near Panathady. The Kerala Tourism Development Corporation (KTDC) also operates guest houses in the area. Private accommodation options in the area include local homestays, lodges, and small resorts.

== Transport ==
=== By road ===
Ranipuram is accessible by road from Kanhangad (approximately 43–48 km (27–30 mi)) via the Panathady junction. State highway connectivity is good up to Panathady; from there, a 9 km (5.6 mi) unsealed road leads to the hill station. Jeep hire services operate from Panathady, and there are limited bus services from Kanhangad on the Panathur route.

=== By rail ===
The nearest railway station is Kanhangad railway station, approximately 43–45 km (27–28 mi) from the hill station. Nileswaram railway station is approximately 31 km (19 mi) away.

=== By air ===
The nearest international airport is Mangalore International Airport in Karnataka, approximately 125 km (78 mi) from Ranipuram. Kannur International Airport, Kerala, is approximately 95 km (59 mi) away.

== See also ==
- Kasaragod district
- Western Ghats
- Talacauvery Wildlife Sanctuary
- Ranipuram (village article)
