= Chattanchal =

- Village
- Location within Kerala Location within India
- Coordinates: 12.4809°N 75.0568°E
- Country: India
- State: Kerala
- District: Kasaragod

Languages
  - Official: Malayalam
- Time zone: UTC+5:30 (IST)
- PIN: 671541
- Area code: 04994
- Vehicle registration: KL 14

Chattanchal is a village in the Kasaragod district of Kerala, India. It is located near Thekkil, east of Kasaragod, along National Highway 66.
