= Talakaveri Wildlife Sanctuary =

Wildlife sanctuary in India

- IUCN category IV (habitat/species management area)
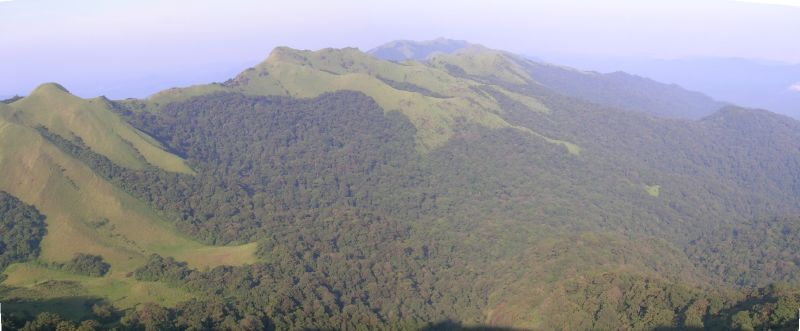

- Location within Karnataka Location within India
- Interactive map of Talakaveri Wildlife Sanctuary
- Location: Kodagu district, Karnataka, South India
- Nearest city: Madikeri Kodagu (Karnataka)
- Coordinates: 12°20′N 75°30′E
- Area: 105 km^{2} (41 sq mi)
- Established: 1987
- Designated: wildlife sanctuary
- Governing body: Karnataka Forest Department

Talakaveri Wildlife Sanctuary is a wildlife sanctuary in Karnataka state of South India. It is located in Kodagu district and is spread over 105 km². It borders with Ranipuram Hills and Kottencheri hills in Kasaragod district of Kerala.

== Flora and fauna ==
Albizia lebbeck, Artocarpus lakoocha, Dysoxylum malabaricum and Mesua ferrea' are some of the species of flora found here. Clawless otter, Asian elephant, Bengal tiger, Stripe-necked mongoose and mouse deer are some of the animal species found here. Fairy bluebird and Malabar trogon are some of the avian species found.
