= Panathady =

- village
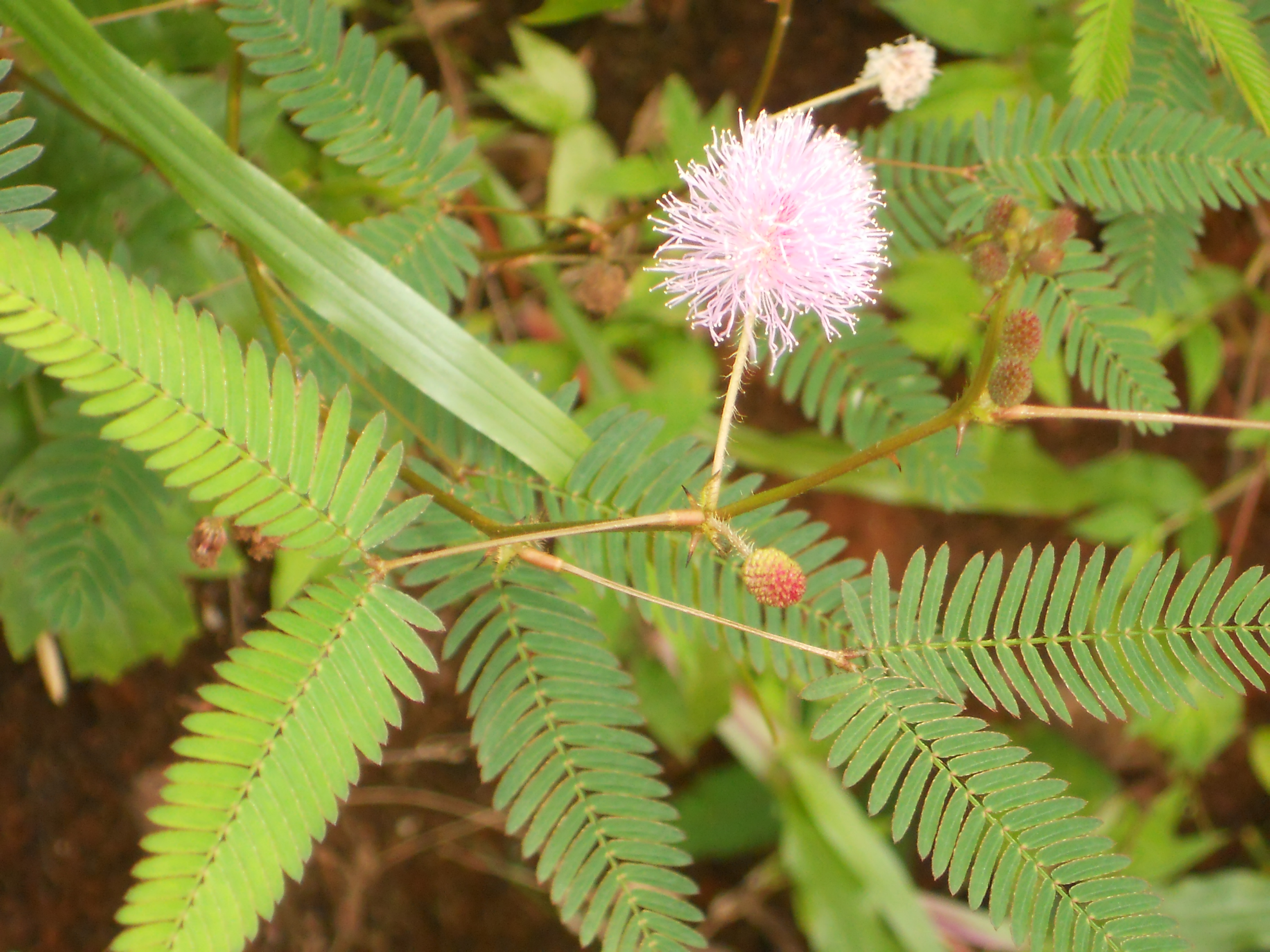
- Mimosa in Panathady

- Location in Kerala, India Panathady (India)
- Coordinates: 12.4493200°N 75.302160°E
- Country: India
- State: Kerala
- District: Kasaragod

Area
  - Total: 88.77 km^{2} (34.27 sq mi)

Population (2011)
  - Total: 22,976
  - Density: 258.8/km^{2} (670.4/sq mi)

Languages
  - Official: Malayalam, English
- Time zone: UTC+5:30 (IST)
- Vehicle registration: KL- 79

Panathady is a village in Kasaragod district in the state of Kerala, India. Panathady Panchayat is in Vellarikundu taluk. It is located 35 kilometers from the nearest municipality, Kanhangad, and 7.5 kilometers from the Kerala-Karnataka border town, Panathur.

Politically, Panathady is included in the Kanhangad legislative assembly and Kasaragod Loksabha assembly.

== Administration ==
This panchayath is administered as a part of the newly formed Vellarikundu taluk. Panchayath is ruled by LDF local self government. Mrs. Prasanna Prasad is the current president of Panathady panchayath. The administrative office, ie: Panchayath Office is at Panathur. Village office also situated in Panathur.

== Demographics ==
As of 2011 India census, Panathady had a population of 22976 with 11319 males and 11657 females.

The most widely spoken language is Malayalam. The most common religions are Hinduism, Islam and Christianity. There are four tribal communities inhabiting this area: Mavilan, Malavettuva Kudiya and Marati.

== Economy ==
The economy is mostly agriculture based, with rubber, paddy, banana, coconut and the Areca nut being the most cultivated products.

== Education ==
There is one higher secondary school, GHSS Balanthode. GHS Panathur and many primary schools are situated in the main Panathady village. Apart from these two High Schools there are other three more government schools in panathady, they are Govt LP school Kallappalli, Govt LP school Peruthadi and Govt LP school Parakkadavu. St. Mary's English Medium School is another main school in Panathady panchayath. Panathady have only one college, St. Marys Arts and Science college, affiliated to Kannur University.

== Geography ==
Geographically, it is a hilly region, and is part of the Western Ghats.

== Transportation ==
Panathady located in kerala karanataka border. Nearest town is Sullia, Karnataka, which is 30 km from Panathadi. Kanhangad is the nearest town in kerala side and it is 36 km away from Panathady. People uses Private and KSRTC buses for transportation mainly. There is no Railway connectivity here. Proposed Kanhangad- Kanoyoor Railway line connect panathady. From Panathady Karantaka towns like sullia, Bhagamandala, Madikkeri, puttur etc. can be accessed easily. KSRTC and private buses connects these towns from Panathady. Famous tourism place Madikkeri/Coorg is 72 km away from Panathady. People who are traveling to Bangalore or Mysore pass through panathadi. For Local transportation People uses Jeep services and Auto Rikshas. Places like Ranipuram, Peruthadi, Parakkadavu, Kallappalli etc. are the places where there is no proper transportation medium is not available.

== Climate ==
Panathady have mixed climate. Summer is Hot and During Rainy season and Winter time panathady get cooler climate.

== Tourism ==
Rabnipuram is a tourist destination located in the Panathady Panchayat, known for its climate and natural landscape. The area features non-commercialized local waterfalls, including Jothalag Waterfall, as well as the Balanthode check dam. A branch of the Chandragiri River flows through the village and is used for recreational swimming.
