= Kasaragod taluk =

Taluk in Kerala, India

Kasaragod or Casrod, a taluk which along with Hosdurg taluk, Manjeshwaram Taluk and Vellarikundu taluk constitute the Kasaragod district, Kerala, India. Its educational center is Vidyanagar. The major areas include Kasaragod municipality, Chemnad, Bedira, and Chengala. The Central Plantation Crops Research Institute is located in the taluk.

== Villages in Kasaragod ==
Kasaragod taluk has 34 villages.

- Adkathbail, Adoor, Adhur, Badiadka, Bandadka, Bedadka,
- Bela, Bellur, Chemnad, Chengala, Delampady, Kalnad
- Karivedakam, Karadka, Kasaragod, Kolathur, Kudlu
- Kumbadaje, Kuttikole, Madhur, Muliyar, Munnad, Muttathody
- Neerchal, Nekraje, Nettanige, Pady, Patla, Perumbala
- Puthoor, Shiribagilu, Thalangara, Thekkil and Ubrangala

== Demographics ==
According to 2011 census, Kasaragod taluk had a population of 681,736, which includes 332,754 males and 349,032 females. The average sex ratio is 1049 lower than state average of 1084. Total literacy rate is 89.45% lower than state average of 94%. Kasaragod taluk constitutes 48.84% Hindus, 48.15% Muslims followed by 2.82% Christians and others.

Religions in Kasaragod Subdistrict (2011)
1. Hinduism (48.8%)
2. Islam (48.1%)
3. Christianity (2.82%)
4. Other (0.20%)

As of 2011 Indian census, Kasaragod subdistrict had total population of 681,736, among which 480,405 (70.5%) registered Malayalam as their mother tongue, 110,621 (16.2%) marked Tulu as their mother tongue, 43,664 (6.4%) marked Kannada as mother tongue, 18,718 (2.7%) marked Marathi as mother tongue, 15,378 (2.26%) marked Konkani as mother tongue, 5657 (0.83%) marked Urdu as mother tongue and 1.11% marked under other Indian languages.

Languages in Kasaragod Subdistrict
Language	Speakers
Malayalam	70.5%
Tulu	16.2%
Kannada	6.4%
Marathi	2.7%
Konkani	2.3%
Others	1.9%
Distribution of languages Source: 2011 Census
