= Mulleria, Kasaragod =

Mulleria
- Town
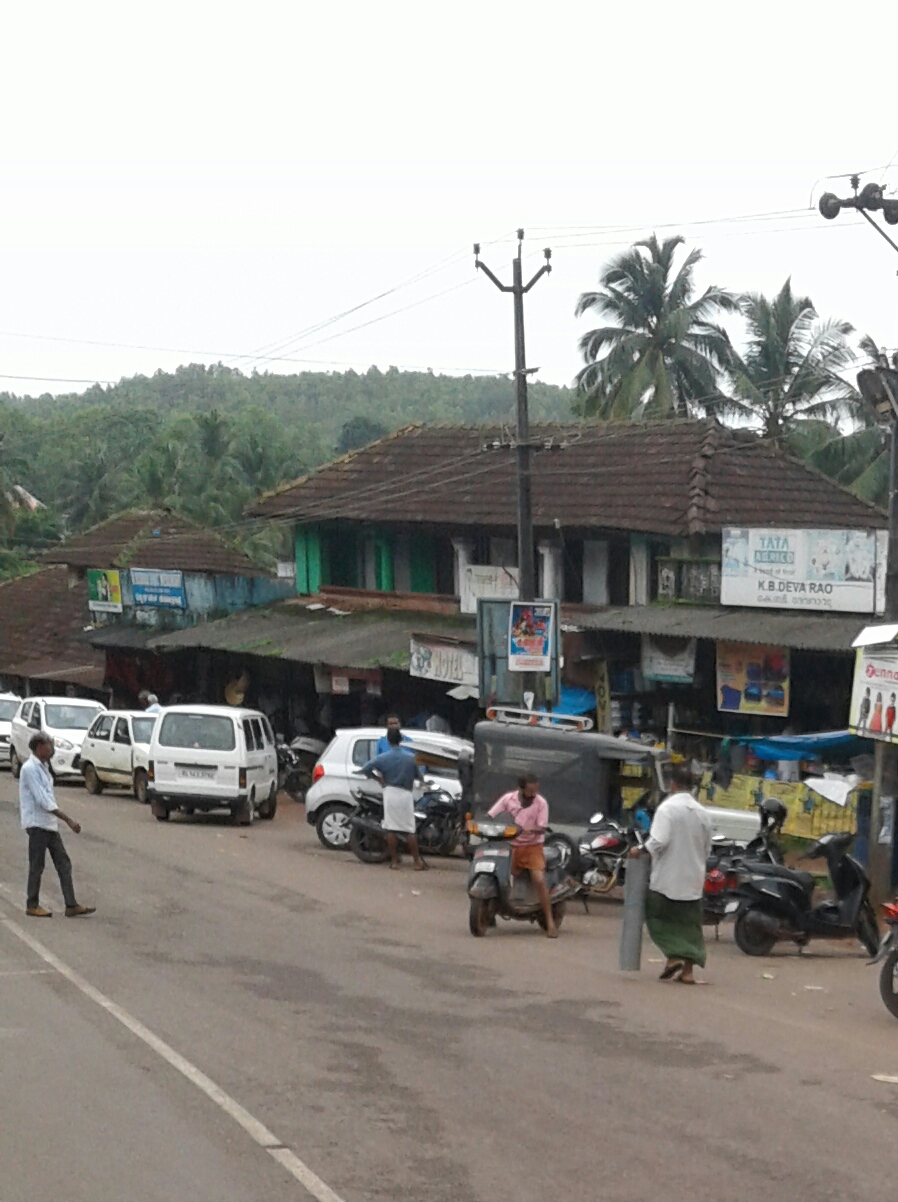
- Mulleria

- Location in Kerala, India Mulleria (India)
- Coordinates: 12.5510°N 75.1633°E
- Country: India
- State: Kerala
- District: Kasaragod

Government
  - Body: Karadka panchayat

Languages
  - Official: Malayalam, Kannada, English
- Time zone: UTC+5:30 (IST)
- PIN: 671543
- Telephone code: 04994
- Vehicle registration: KL-14
- Nearest city: Kasaragod

Mulleria is a small town located in Karadka Panchayath, Kasaragod district in Kerala, India.

== Transportation ==
The western main road from Mulleria to Kasaragod has access to the NH.66, which connects to Mangalore in the north and Kannur in the south. The road to the east connects to Sullia in Karnataka, from where Mysore and Bangalore can be accessed. Moreover, we can easily access to Puttur via Sulliapadav, Karnataka. The nearest railway station is Kasaragod on the Mangalore-Palakkad line. There is International Airport at Mangalore on North. Mulleria town is connect to four major road, which is connect throughout Badiadka, Kumble, Mangalore in the north. And north west connect to Natakal, Belluru, Sulliapadav, Puttur through GG Road. In the western Cherkala to Kasaragod and east connected to Bangaluru through Mysore and Coorg.

== Overview ==
Mulleria is a small village/hamlet in Kasargod Taluk in Kasaragod District of Kerala, India. It comes under Karaduka Panchayath. It belongs to North Kerala Division. It is located 22 km to the east of District headquarters Kasaragod. 16 km from Kasargod. 575 km from State capital Thiruvananthapuram. Kumbadaje (7 km), Badiyadka (11 km), Enmakaje (14 km), Chengala (16 km) are the nearby villages to Mulleria. Mulleria is surrounded by Kanhangad Taluk towards South, Puttur Taluk towards North, Manjeshwar Taluk towards west, Sulya Taluk towards East. Kasaragod, Puttur, Kanhangad, Payyannur are the nearby cities to Mulleria. It is near to Arabian sea. There is a chance of humidity in the weather.

Locality Name : Mulleria

Taluk Name : Kasargod

District : Kasaragod

State : Kerala

Division : North Kerala

Language : Malayalam, English, kannada, Konkani, Tulu

Elevation / Altitude: 18 meters. Above Sea level

Telephone Code / Std Code: 04994

Assembly constituency : Kasaragod Assembly Constituency

Member of Legislative Assembly : N. A. Nellikkunnu

Lok Sabha constituency : Kasaragod (Lok Sabha constituency)

Member of Parliament : P. Karunakaran

Pin Code : 671543

Post Office Name : Mulleria/Adhur

Main Village Name : Karaduka

Alternate Village Name : Adhur Village

Police station: Adhur

== Details of Post Office MULLERIA, KASARGOD ==
Post Office: MULLERIA

Post Office Type: SUB OFFICE

District: KASARGOD

State: KERALA

Pin Code: 671543

Contact Address: Postmaster, Post Office MULLERIA (SUB OFFICE), KASARGOD, KERALA (KL), India (IN), Pin Code:- 671543

Delivery Status:- DELIVERY

Postal Taluk:- KASARAGOD

Postal Division:- KASARAGOD

Postal Region:- CALICUT

Postal Circle:- KERALA

== Clubs ==
- 1. Kalidasa Kadakam
- 2. Shri Vishnu Arts & Sports Club
- 3. AASC AMBIKANAGAR
- 4. NASC Natakal.
- 5.Eleven star Adhur.
- 6.Chethana Arts & Sports club
- 7.Sri Ram cricketers.
- 8.Nava chethana Beerangole.
- 9.Seva bharathi
- 10.Safdar hasmi Gadigudda
- 11.Red star Karmanthody
- 12.ayodya friends mulleria
- 13. Sri Bharathamba Gadigudde
- 14. Navajyothi Arts & sports club Kanakkod
- 15. Pournami Adukkam
- 16.Rising sports & Arts Club poovadka

== Educational Institution ==
- ALPS MULLERIA
- AUPS MULLERIA
- GVHSS MULLERIA
- BEJA MODEL COLLEGE OF ARTS AND SCIENCE
- VOCATIONAL HIGHER SECONDARY ARTS AND SCIENCE
- Kasaragod Taluk IT Education
- Vidhyashree Sikshana Kendra

== About Karadka ==
According to the 2011 census, the location code (or village code) of Karadka village is 627111. Karadka village is located in the Kasaragod Tehsil of Kasaragod district in Kerala, India, about 23 km away from Kasaragod, which is both the district and sub-district headquarters of the Karadka village. As per 2009 statistics, Karadka village is also a gram panchayat.

The total geographical area of the village is 1859 hectares and it has a total population of 9,613 people. There are about 2,158 houses in the Karadka village. Kasaragod is the nearest town to Karadka.

== Population of Karadka ==
Total Population 9,613

Male Population 4,693

Female Population 4,920

== Nearby villages of Karadka ==
- Ubrangala
- Kumbadaje
- Nettanige
- Bellur
- Adhur
- Muliyar
- Kolathur
- Bedadka
- Munnad
- Kuttikole
- Karivedakam

== Tourism ==
Kasaragod is often named as land of Lords and Forts. It has 9 rivers (out of a total of the 44 rivers that flow in Kerala), hills, beaches, backwaters, as well as temples, churches, mosques and forts. Mulleria is known for its rich culture and natural environment. Temples, mosque, are mainly attracted so many pilgrims to Mulleria .

- 1. Payashwini River
- 2. Adhur Panchalingeshwara Temple
- 3. Adhur Mosque and Uroos
- 4. Yakshagana events at Mulleria
- 5. Ganesha Chaturthi
- 6. Kanchana Ganga Kalagrama
- 7. Jambri Festival

== Auditoriums ==
1.Ganesh Kala Mandir

2.Kalyan Auditorium

== Image gallery ==
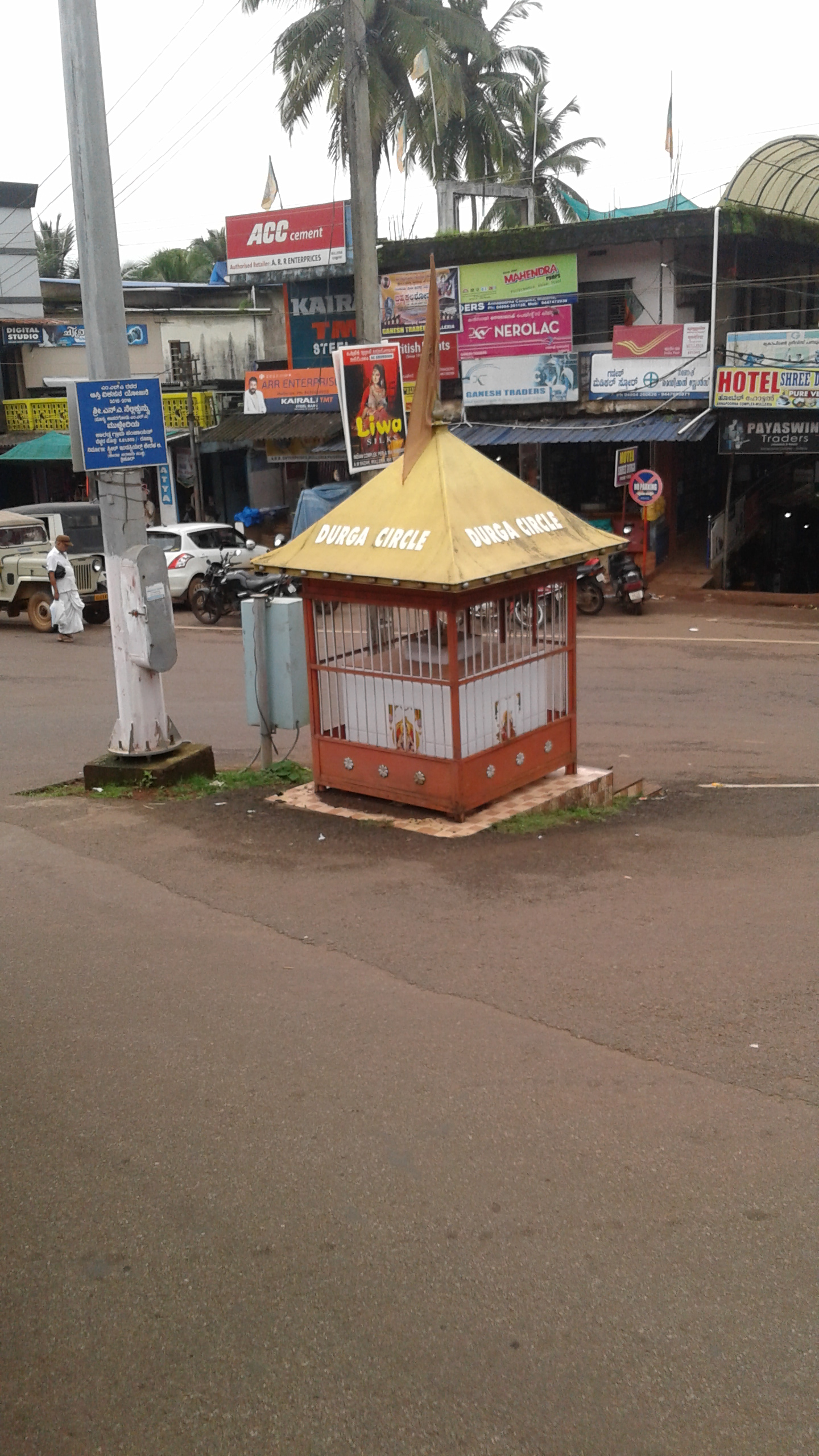
Mulleria town

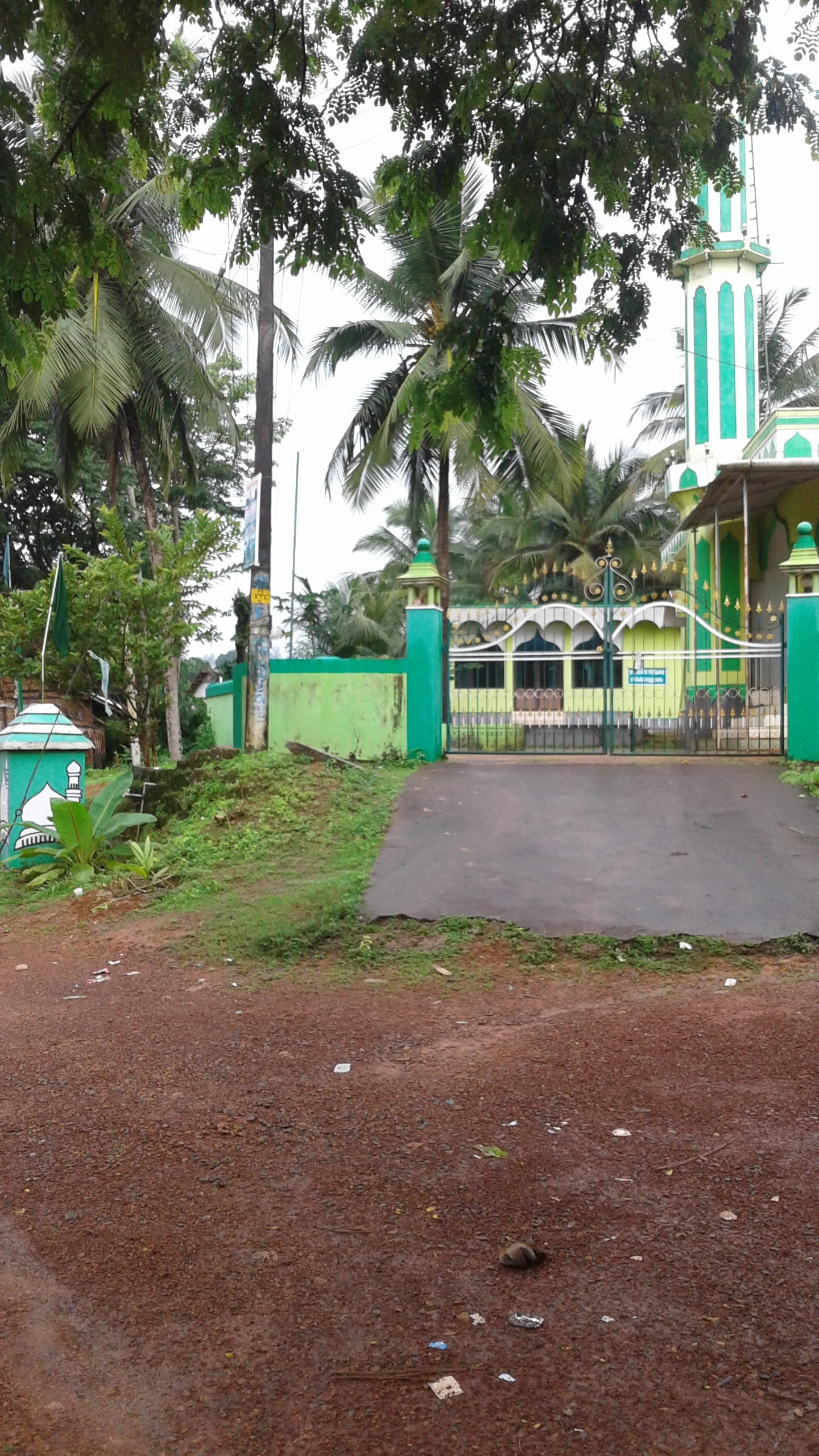
Kundar mosque

== See also ==
- Adhur
- Muliyar
- Karadka
- Delampady
