= Kolathur =

Kolathur may refer to:

== Kolathur, Tamil Nadu ==
- Kolathur, Chennai, neighborhood of Chennai, Tamil Nadu, India
  - Kolathur Assembly constituency
  - Kolathur taluk, subdistrict of Chennai
- Kolathur, Salem, town in Salem district, Tamil Nadu, India
  - Kolathur block, revenue block
- Kolathur, Tiruvannamalai, village in Tamil Nadu, India
- Kolathur, Tamil Nadu Assembly constituency, Pudukkottai district, Tamil Nadu, India (defunct)

== Kolathur, Kerala ==
- Kolathur (Kasaragod), village in Kasaragod district, Kerala, India
- Kolattur, Kerala, town in Kerala, India
