= Ayamkadavu Bridge =

Bridge in the South Indian state of Kerala

Ayamkadavu Bridge ആയംകടവ് പാലം
- Crosses: Chandragiri river
- Locale: Periya, Kasaragod, Kerala, India

Characteristics
- Total length: 120 m
- Width: 10 m
- Height: 25 m

History
- Constructed by: Jasmine Constructions
- Construction start: 2016
- Construction cost: ₹17 crores
- Inaugurated: 8 December 2019

The Ayamkadavu Bridge is a bridge over the Vavadukkam river, that connects the Periya village with Bedaduka village in Kasaragod, Kerala, India. The 120 meter bridge is the highest in Kerala, with its spans measuring a height of 25 meter.

== Overview ==
The bridge has been constructed at Ayamkadavu across the Vavadukkam river, a tributary of Chandragiri river. It connects Pullur Periya and Badiadka villages in Kasaragod district. It is billed as the highest bridge in the state. The bridge was built to improve connectivity to places like Sullia and Madikeri in Karnataka, as well as Kanhangad and the Central University of Kerala in Periya in the district. In 2012, the P. Prabhakaran Commission appointed by the UDF government recommended the bridge as part of a comprehensive development plan for Kasaragod district. Its foundation stone was laid in December 2016. It was inaugurated by Chief Minister Pinarai Vijayan on 8 December 2019. The total construction cost of the bridge has been estimated as ₹17 crores.

The 120 meter long and 10 meter wide bridge has 4 spans of 30 meter each and 6 spans of 10 meter each without cross beams. The construction has been done using pre-stressed technology. The bridge is also unique in that it has no joints in its entire length. There is also a footpath of 2.5 meters width on the bridge.
