= Bedadka =

Bedakam
- village
- Location in Kerala, India Bedakam (India)
- Coordinates: 12°27′0″N 75°9′0″E
- Country: India
- State: Kerala
- District: Kasaragod

Government
  - Type: Panchayati Raj (India)
  - Body: Bedadka Grama Panchayat

Area
  - Total: 36.24 km^{2} (13.99 sq mi)

Population (2011)
  - Total: 13,476
  - Density: 371.9/km^{2} (963.1/sq mi)

Languages
  - Official: Malayalam, English
- Time zone: UTC+5:30 (IST)
- Vehicle registration: KL-14

Bedakam is a village in Kasaragod district in the state of Kerala, India.

== Demographics ==
As of 2011 Census, Bedadka village had a population of 13,476 with 6,460 males and 7,016 females. Bedadka village has an area of 36.24 km^{2} (13.99 sq mi) with 2,985 families residing in it. The average female sex ratio was 1086 higher than the state average of 1084. 10.93% of the population in the village was under 6 years of age. Bedadka had an average literacy of 86.7% lower than the state average of 94%; male literacy was 90.56% and female literacy was 83.22%.

Bedadka Grama Panchayat had total population of 27,868 which constitute 13,281 males and 14,587 females with 6,305 families residing in it. Bedadka Panchayat has administration over the villages of Kolathur, Munnad and Bedadka.

== Transportation ==
Local roads have access to NH.66 which connects to Mangalore in the north and Kannur in the south. The nearest railway station is Kanhangad on Mangalore-Palakkad line. There are airports at Mangalore and kannur. The Ayamkadavu bridge connect Bedakam with Periya.
