= Bela (Kasaragod) =

Village in Kerala, India

- Village
- Location in Kerala, India Bela (India)
- Coordinates: 12.5693°N 75.0436°E
- Country: India
- State: Kerala
- District: Kasargod
- Taluk: Kasaragod

Government
  - Body: Badiyadka Grama Panchayat

Area
  - Total: 22.79 km^{2} (8.80 sq mi)

Population (2011)
  - Total: 11,144
  - Density: 489.0/km^{2} (1,266/sq mi)

Languages
  - Official: Malayalam, English
- Time zone: UTC+5:30 (IST)
- PIN: 671321
- Telephone code: 04998-
- Vehicle registration: KL-14
- Nearest city: Kasaragod
- Lok Sabha constituency: Kasaragod
- Climate: 20c to 40c (Köppen)

Bela is a village in Kasaragod taluk of Kasaragod district in Indian state of Kerala.

== Location ==
Bela is located 13 km north east of Kasaragod town, 13 km south east of Kumbla and 5 km away from Badiyadka via Cherkala-Kalladka road.

== Demographics ==
As of 2011 Census, Bela village had population of 11,144 of which 5,445 are males and 5,699 are females. Bela village has an area of 22.79 km^{2} (8.80 sq mi) with 2,275 families residing in it. The sex ratio of Bela was 1,047 lower than state average of 1,084. The population of children below 6 years was 10.6%. Bela had overall literacy of 87.6% lower than state average of 94%. The male literacy stands at 91.8% and female literacy at 83.6%.

== Administration ==
Bela village is a part of Badiyadka Grama Panchayat in Kasaragod Block Panchayat. Bela is politically a part of Kasaragod Assembly constituency under Kasaragod (Lok Sabha constituency).
