= Belinja =

Belinja Belinja, Karkadagoli GTF
- hamlet
- Located in Kasaragod, Kerala, India
- Coordinates: 12°35′28.1″N 75°08′19.8″E
- Country: India
- State: Kerala
- District: Kasaragod

Languages
  - Official: malyalam, Tulu
- Time zone: UTC+5:30 (IST)
- PIN: 671551
- Telephone code: +91-4998 (Perdala exchange, Uppala SDE)
- Vehicle registration: KL 14
- Nearest city: Kasaragod
- Lok Sabha constituency: Kasaragod
- Vidhan Sabha constituency: Kasaragod

Belinja is a small hamlet in Kumbadaje village of Kasaragod district, Kerala, India.

The hamlet consists of hillocks and valleys covered with arecanut, coconut and rubber plantations. The road passing through Belinja connects Badiadka to Belluru, Natekal of Mulleria. This road further leads to Sullia Padav and Eeshwaramangala of Karnataka. The road was built in 1984. Also another road from Belinja connects to Movvar.

Most of the people depending traditional agriculture. The important crop people grow here is paddy. The thickly populated areas consists of Hindus and Muslims who follow the traditional customs and festivals. The majority of the people speak Tulu and Kannada. Byari or Malabari Muslims speak a slang version of Malayalam. Poomani Kinnimani Temple fair festival is important celebration here. It is celebrated in the month of March every year. There is a famous Mahavishnu temple nearby at Alinja. Vishnumoorthy Othekola also celebrated once in three years nearby at Vishnumoorthy Nagar, Nadumajalu.

The village has a primary school with Kannada and Malayalam languages, Primary Health Centre, and Anganavadi. The village people give importance for education. Many are working in government and private sectors of this village. Youth of this village are very active. Sports Social and Cultural activities are carried by different clubs in this village. "DIFFENCE CLUB" are famous clubs in this village and another most visited jaram sadiq sha valiyullah also is sitting on top part of this village Youth of this village are very active. Social and Cultural activities are carried by different clubs in this village. Omkar Arts and Sports Club, Poomani Kinnimani Yuvakendra are famous clubs in this village
