= Muliyar =

- Town
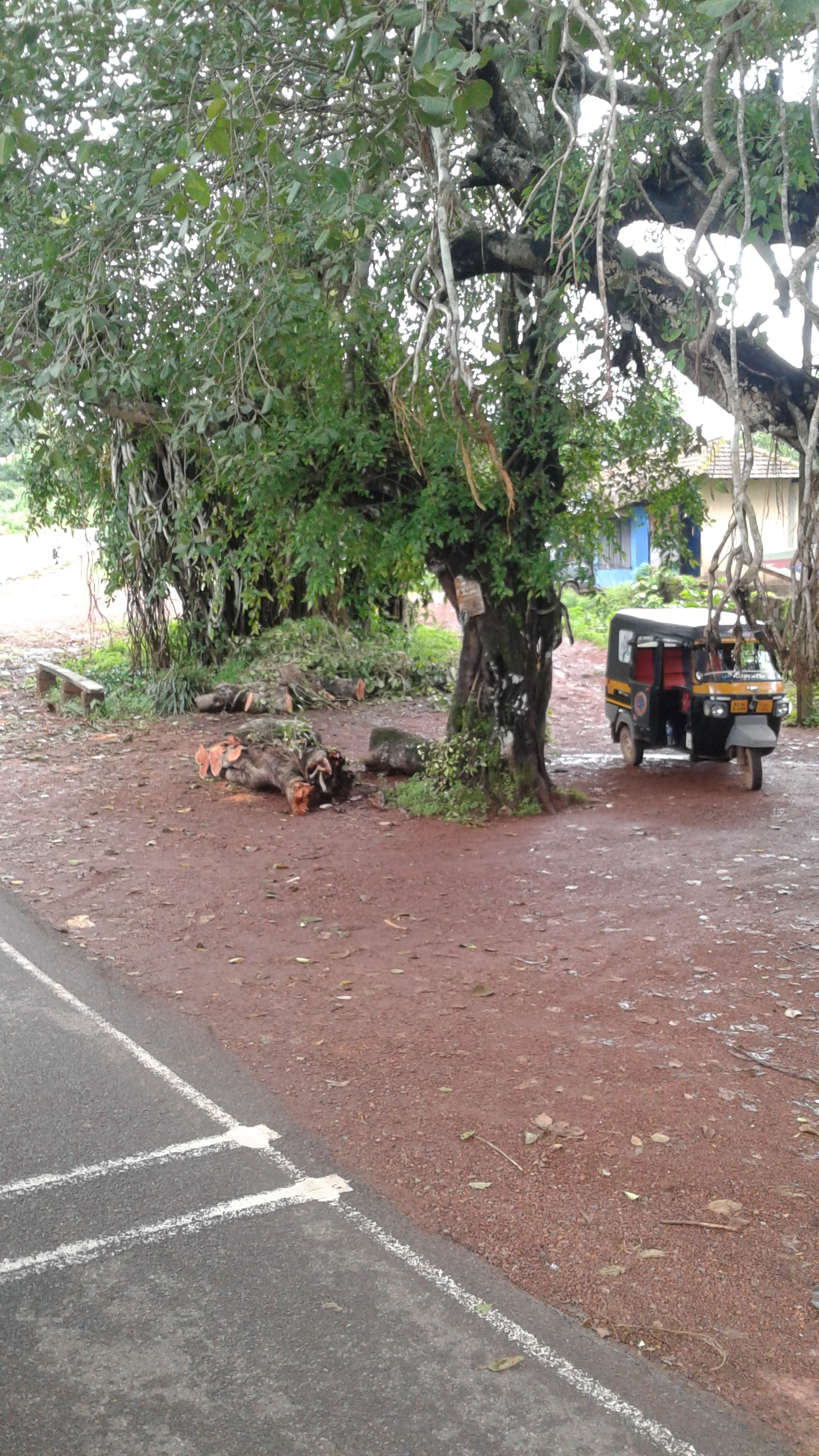
- Muliyar bus stop

- Location in Kerala, India
- Coordinates: 12.507409°N 75.095684°E
- Country: India
- State: Kerala
- District: Kasaragod
- Taluk: Kasaragod

Government
  - Type: Panchayati Raj (India)
  - Body: Muliyar Grama Panchayat

Area
  - Total: 34.27 km^{2} (13.23 sq mi)

Population (2011)
  - Total: 25,095
  - Density: 732.3/km^{2} (1,897/sq mi)

Languages
  - Official: Malayalam, English
- Time zone: UTC+5:30 (IST)
- Vehicle registration: KL-14

Muliyar is a village and Grama Panchayat in the Kasaragod district of Kerala, India.

== Geography ==
Muliyar is located about 12 kilometres (7.5 mi) east of Kasaragod. It is situated along State Highway 55, to the north of the Chandragiri River. The village covers 34.27 square kilometres (13.23 sq mi) of land in Kasaragod taluk.

== Demographics ==
As of 2011 Census, Muliyar village had a population of 25,095 with 12,248 males and 12,847 females. Muliyar village has an area of 34.27 km^{2} (13.23 sq mi) with 4,980 families residing in it. The average female sex ratio was 1049 lower than the state average of 1084. In Muliyar, 12.4% of the population was under 6 years of age. Muliyar had an average literacy of 88.7% lower than the state average of 94%; male literacy was 92.9% and female literacy was 84.8%.

== See also ==
- Adhur
- Mulleria
- Karadka
- Delampady
