= Kolathur (Kasaragod) =

Village in Kerala, India

- Village
- Location in Kerala, India Kolathur (India)
- Coordinates: 12.4577°N 75.0967°E
- Country: India
- State: Kerala
- District: Kasargod
- Taluk: Kasaragod

Government
  - Body: Bedadka Grama Panchayat

Area
  - Total: 17.63 km^{2} (6.81 sq mi)

Population (2011)
  - Total: 5,780
  - Density: 328/km^{2} (849/sq mi)

Languages
  - Official: Malayalam, English
- Time zone: UTC+5:30 (IST)
- PIN: 671541
- Telephone code: 04994
- Vehicle registration: KL-14
- Nearest city: Kasaragod
- Lok Sabha constituency: Kasaragod
- Climate: 20c to 40c (Köppen)

Kolthur is a village in Kasaragod taluk of Kasaragod district in Indian state of Kerala.

== Location ==
Kolathur is located 19 km south east of Kasaragod town, 18 km north of Kanhangad and 7 km away from Poinachi on Poinachi-Bandadka-Kannadithode road.

== Demographics ==
As of 2011 Census, Kolathur village had population of 5,780 of which 2,710 are males and 3,070 are females. Kolathur village spreads over an area of 17.63 km^{2} (6.81 sq mi) with 1,331 families residing in it. The sex ratio of Kolathur was 1,133 higher than state average of 1,084. The population of children below 6 years was 11.2%. Kolathur had overall literacy of 87% lower than state average of 94%. The male literacy stands at 91.3% and female literacy at 83.2%.

== Administration ==
Kolathur village is locally administered by Bedadka Grama Panchayat under Karadka Block Panchayat. Kolathur is politically a part of Udma (State Assembly constituency) in Kasaragod (Lok Sabha constituency).

== Transport ==
National Highway 66 passes through Poinachi Junction which connects Mangalore and Mumbai in the northern side and Kochi and Thiruvananthapuram in the southern side. Poinachi-Kannadithode road connects Kolathur with Poinachi, Bandadka and other nearby towns. Both Kasaragod and Kanhangad railway stations are equidistant from Kolathur of 20 km away. The nearest airports are Mangalore International Airport and Kannur International Airport.
