= Navakana Shankaranarayana Bhat =

Indian social worker

Navakana Shankaranarayana Bhat (Kannada: ಶಂಕರ ನಾರಾಯಣ ಭಟ್. 1927–2013) was a renowned school head-master, social worker and scholar.

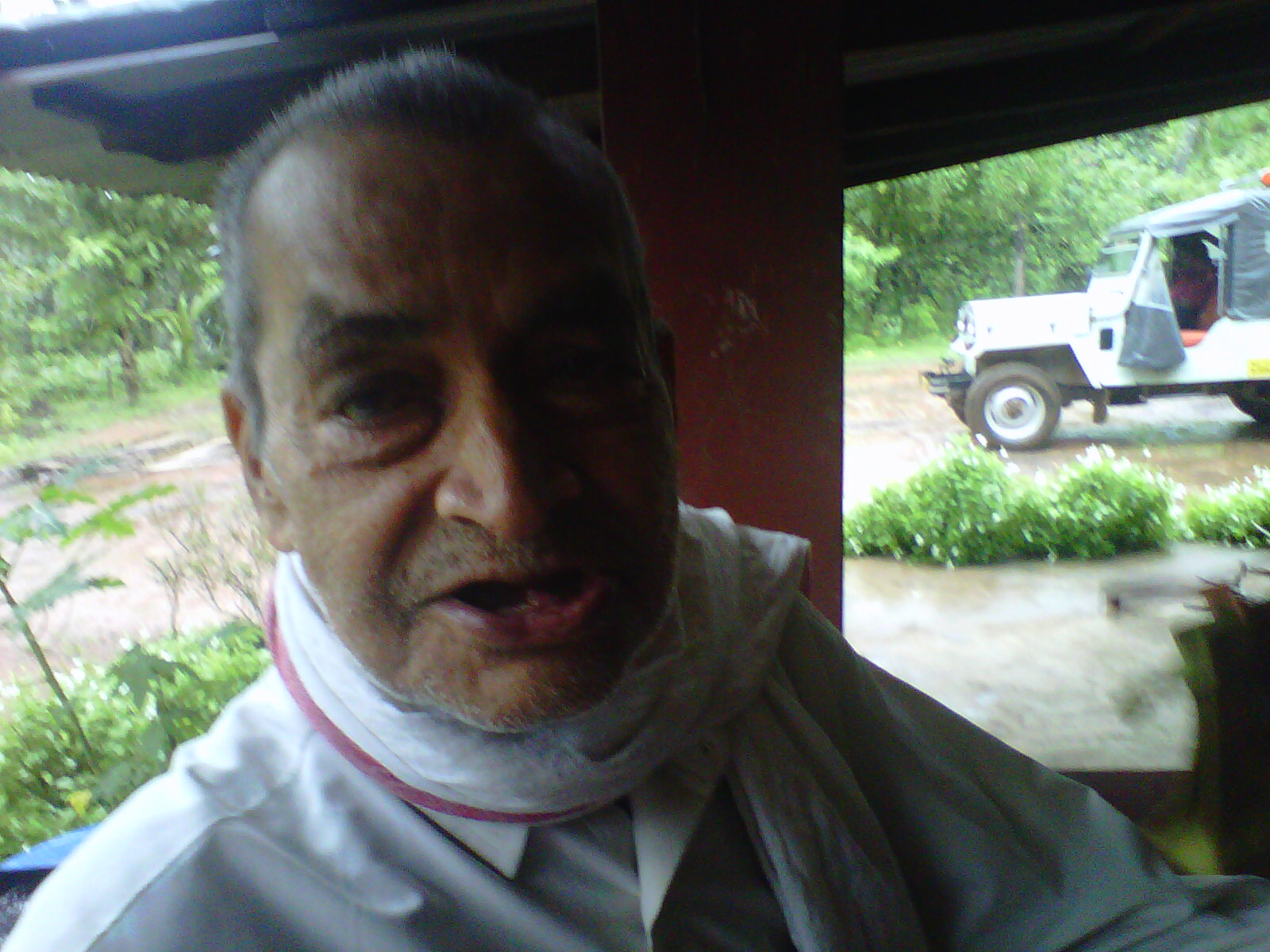
Shanakaranarayana Bhat

== Early life ==
He was born in the small hamlet of Badiadka, Perdala in Kerala. He was the eldest child of N.Krishna Bhat. His mother died at an early age. He fathered four children, Sharada, Shailaja, Shyamala and Murali Krishna. He was the maternal uncle of Chandralekha Dala.

As a child, he was diligent and meticulous. In the days of the British Raj in India, he managed to complete his Bachelor of Arts in St. Aloysius College (Mangalore) and pursue higher studies in Madras Presidency to complete Master of Arts and Bachelor of Training.

He returned to Badiadka as a teacher at Navajeevana High School. During his tenure as a lecturer, he was awarded the best Kerala state teacher award in the year 1986 for his contribution towards education.

== Activities ==
Along with his pursuits in education, he was known for innovative farming methods. He was one of the first ones to grow Singapore arecanut crop, use drip irrigation in Perdala and Kumbla precincts. He was famed in the surrounding precincts for using Kubota field tiller and mechanized farming methods for growing rice. He was a campaigner for social justice and was also trustee of numerous committees in Kasargod district, like Perdala Temple Trust, Mujungavau Temple Trust. He generously sponsored many Vedic summer classes conducted at Perdala temple.

As an ardent public orator, he was regularly invited to ceremonies as a speaker conducted by local authorities, political parties and schools.

== Quotes ==
- When money is lost nothing is lost, when health is lost something is lost, when character is lost everything is lost.
- अनाय्स मरण्म्, विना दयने्न् जीवन्म्॥
