= Alampady =

Alampady Alampady
- town
- Location in Kerala, India
- Coordinates: 12°31′28″N 75°1′47″E
- Country: India
- State: Kerala
- District: Kasaragod

Languages
  - Official: Malayalam, English
- Time zone: UTC+5:30 (IST)
- PIN: 671123
- Telephone code: 04994
- Vehicle registration: KL- 14
- Coastline: 0 kilometres (0 mi)
- Nearest city: Kasaragod
- Website: Alampady Website

Alampady is a town located in Muttathody, Kasaragod, Kerala, India. The village is situated in the northern part of the district, close to the border with the state of Karnataka.

The village is known for its beautiful natural surroundings, with lush forests, rivers, and waterfalls in the area. The village is home to a number of temples, including the Alampady Sree Krishna Temple and the Alampady Anantha Padmanabha Temple, which are popular with local visitors and tourists.

In addition to its natural beauty and cultural attractions, Alampady is also home to a number of small businesses and industries, including agriculture and forestry. The village is known for its production of coconut and arecanut, as well as its woodworking and furniture-making industries.

Overall, Alampady is a village located in the Kasaragod district of Kerala, known for its natural beauty, cultural attractions, and small-scale industries.

== Demographics ==
As of 2001 India census, Alampady had a population of 2365 with 1298 males and 1067 females. 2011 Census of India
