= Delampady =

- village
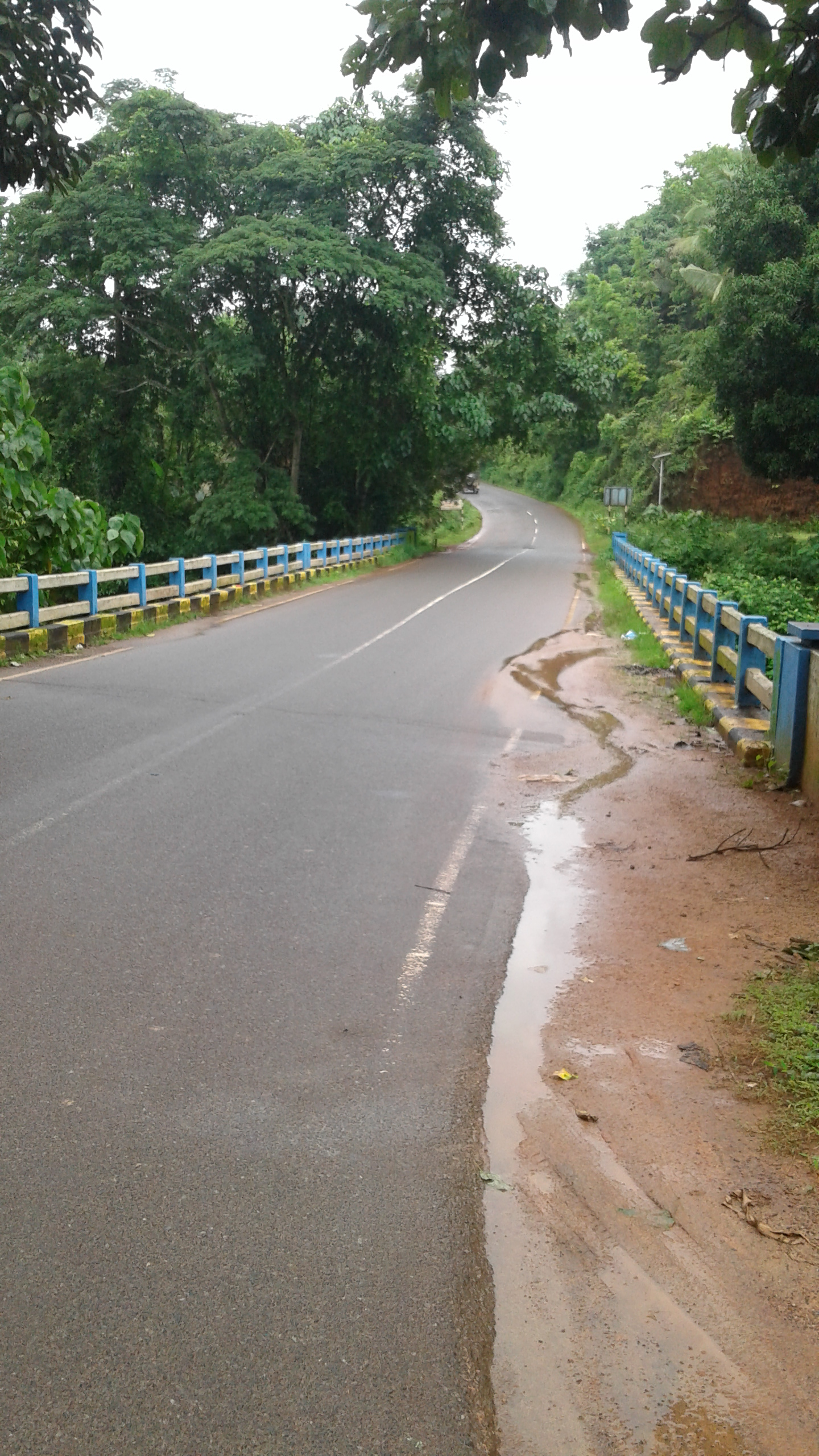
- Kottiyadi bridge

- Location in Kerala, India Delampady (India)
- Coordinates: 12.5973°N 75.2917°E
- Country: India
- State: Kerala
- District: Kasaragod
- Taluk: Kasaragod

Government
  - Type: Panchayati Raj (India)
  - Body: Delampady Grama Panchayat

Area
  - Total: 79.5 km^{2} (30.7 sq mi)

Population (2011)
  - Total: 22,773
  - Density: 286/km^{2} (742/sq mi)

Languages
  - Official: Malayalam, English, Kannada
- Time zone: UTC+5:30 (IST)
- Postal code: 671543
- Vehicle registration: KL-14

Delampady is a village and Grama Panchayat in Kasaragod district in the state of Kerala, India.

== Demographics ==
As of 2011 Census, Delampady village had population of 7,291 with 3,693 males and 3,598 females. Delampady village has an area of 15.68 km^{2} (6.05 sq mi) with 1,314 families residing in it. The average female sex ratio was 974 lower than the state average of 1084. In Delampady, 10.8% of the population was under 6 years of age. Delampady had an average literacy of 84.93% lower than the state average of 94%; male literacy was 89.55% and female literacy was 80.16%.

Delampady Grama Panchayat had total population of 22,773 with 11,360 males and 11,413 females. Total families residing in the rural panchayat limit was 4,371. Delampady Panchayat has administration over the villages of Delampady and Adoor.

== Transportation ==
The western main road to Kasaragod have access to NH.66 which connects to Mangalore in the north and Calicut in the south. The road to the east connects to Sullia in Karnataka from where Mysore and Bangalore can be accessed. The nearest railway station is Kasaragod on Mangalore-Palakkad line. There is an airport at Mangalore.

Delampady is a Kerala village but it has no road access to Kerala. Delampady has an area of 89 km^{2}. and 45% of the village is forest land. Delampady has 1457 houses and the total population is 6,000. There are nine roads for entering Delampadi and all of them are connected to Karnataka state only. The village territory is zigzagging between Kerala and Karnataka and at every 300 metres, you can find either a Kerala territory or a Karnataka territory. The only connection to Kerala is the two kilometre long forest track called Mayyala-Parappa road which is dangerous to walk because of the constant threat of moving herds of wild elephants. This road is six-metre wide but bus facility is not available because there is no tar surface on the road. This road is only two kilometre long but elephants are found almost all the time in this area.

== Facilities ==
Most of the people in Delampady depend upon Ishwaramangala village in Karnataka for their provisions. Adoor town is 13 km away and Mulleria town is 20 km away. Puttur City is 36 km away. Border villages in this locality include Kottyadi Bridge, Jalsoor Road, Pallathur Bridge, Parapa-Mudoor, Panchikkal, Kalladukka-Derkkaje, Ujjampadi-Munchikkan, Salathadukka-Panchuvadi, Kombode and Nunjubettu-Erikkadappu. There is a forest outpost at Kottyadi village.

The headquarters of Delampady village is Adoor Town, where the Panchayat office is also located. Almost all the government offices are also located in Adoor. The main agricultural activity of Delampady village is rubber plantation.

== See also ==
- Adoor
- Mulleria
- Muliyar
- Karadka
