= Periya double murder case =

2019 murders in Kerala, India

- Location: Periya, Kasaragod, Kerala, India
- Date: February 17, 2019; 7 years ago
- Attack type: Murder
- Deaths: 2
- Accused: 28
- Convicted: 14

On 17 February 2019, two Indian Youth Congress activists from Kallyod, 23-year-old Sharath Lal and 19-year-old Kripesh, were stabbed to death at Kallyod Periya, Kasaragod district, Kerala, India. At trial, 14 people were found guilty for their involvement in the killings, of 24 people accused.

== Background ==
In January 2019, Sharath Lal assaulted one of the accused during a clash regarding a Perumkaliyattam celebration in Kalliot, which he had helped organise. Lal was briefly imprisoned on an assault charge, but was released by 17 February.

== Murders ==
On February 17, 2019, at around 7:30 pm, Sharath Lal and Kripesh were riding a motorcycle along the Koorankara road in Kallyod (Periye), a rural area in Kasaragod district. They were intercepted by a group of assailants and attacked; Kripesh was declared dead on site, while Sharath died on route to hospital.

== Aftermath ==
The killings, believed to have been politically motivated, immediately sparked outrage and led to widespread protests.

== Investigation ==
In March 2019, the Crime Branch arrested A Peethambaran, a Communist Party of India (Marxist) local committee member, and C J Saji, his accomplice. However, there was widespread dissatisfaction with the progress of the investigation. In April 2019, in response to public outcry, the parents of the victims approached the Kerala High Court, demanding that the case be handed over to the Central Bureau of Investigation (CBI). The court ruled in favour of their petition. In September 2019, the High Court’s Single Bench ordered the transfer of the investigation to the CBI, a decision that was upheld by the Division Bench.

In December 2021, after the state government’s challenge was rejected by the Supreme Court, the CBI took over the investigation.

=== Trial ===
The trial began in Kochi in February 2023. In December 2024, the court found 14 of the 24 accused guilty for their involvement in the killings.
