= Ubrangala =

- village
- Location in Kerala, India Ubrangala (India)
- Coordinates: 12°34′0″N 75°6′0″E
- Country: India
- State: Kerala
- District: Kasaragod
- Taluk: Kasaragod

Government
  - Body: Kumbadaje Grama Panchayat

Area
  - Total: 4.78 km^{2} (1.85 sq mi)

Population (2011)
  - Total: 3,611
  - Density: 755/km^{2} (1,960/sq mi)

Languages
  - Official: Malayalam, English
- Time zone: UTC+5:30 (IST)
- PIN: 671551
- Vehicle registration: KL-14

Ubrangala is a village in Kasaragod district in the state of Kerala, India.

== Demographics ==
As of 2011 Census, Ubrangala had a population of 3,611 with 1,782 males and 1,829 females. Ubrangala village has an area of 4.78 km^{2} (1.85 sq mi) with 702 families residing in it. In Ubrangala, 10.77% of the population was under 6 years of age. Ubrangala had an average literacy of 87.58% higher than the national average of 74% and lower than the state average of 94%: male literacy was 92.65% and female literacy was 82.64%.

== Transportation ==
The western main road to Kasaragod have access to NH.66 which connects to Mangalore in the north and Calicut in the south. The road to the east connects to Sullia in Karnataka from where Mysore and Bangalore can be accessed. The nearest railway station is Kasaragod on Mangalore-Palakkad line. There is an airport at Mangalore.
