= Patla, Kasaragod =

Patla
- village
- Location in Kerala, India Patla (India)
- Coordinates: 12°33′25″N 75°0′10″E
- Country: India
- State: Kerala
- District: Kasaragod
- Talukas: Kasaragod

Languages
  - Official: Malayalam, Tulu
- Time zone: UTC+5:30 (IST)
- PIN: 671124
- Telephone code: 04994
- Vehicle registration: KL-14
- Nearest city: Kasaragod
- Climate: moderate (Köppen)

Patla is a village in Kasaragod district in the state of Kerala, India.
