= Shiribagilu =

- village
- Location in Kerala, India
- Coordinates: 12.55229°N 74.98366°E
- Country: India
- State: Kerala
- District: Kasaragod

Population (2011)
  - Total: 7,630

Languages
  - Official: Malayalam, Tulu
- Time zone: UTC+5:30 (IST)
- Vehicle registration: KL-14

Shiribagilu is a village in Kasaragod district in the state of Kerala, India.

It was the capital of Mayipadi Kingdom, a Nagavamasha clan established by Mayura Varman. Madhur Ganapathi Temple is the paradevata temple of Mayipadi kings. The current titular head Sri Dana Marthanda Varma Raja Ramantharasugal - XIII is the hereditary trustee of the temple.

== Demographics ==
As of 2011 India census, Shiribagilu had a population of 7630 with 3757 males and 3873 females.
