= Pady =

- village
- Location in Kerala, India
- Coordinates: 12°36′0″N 74°59′30″E
- Country: India
- State: Kerala
- District: Kasaragod

Population (2011)
  - Total: 8,016

Languages
  - Official: Malayalam, English
- Time zone: UTC+5:30 (IST)
- Vehicle registration: KL-

Pady is a village in Kasaragod district in the state of Kerala, India.

== Demographics ==
As of 2011 India census, Pady had a population of 8,016, with 3,928 males and 4,088 females.
