= Karivedakam =

- village
- Location in Kerala, India Karivedakam (India)
- Coordinates: 12°28′0″N 75°15′0″E
- Country: India
- State: Kerala
- District: Kasaragod

Government
  - Type: Panchayati raj (India)
  - Body: Gram panchayat

Area
  - Total: 22.06 km^{2} (8.52 sq mi)

Population (2011)
  - Total: 10,042
  - Density: 455.2/km^{2} (1,179/sq mi)

Languages
  - Official: Malayalam, English
- Time zone: UTC+5:30 (IST)
- PIN: 671541
- Vehicle registration: KL-14

Karivedakam is a village in Kasaragod district in the state of Kerala, India.

== Demographics ==
As of 2011 Census, Karivedakam village had population of 10,042 with 4,996 are males and 5,046 females. Karivedakam village has an area of 22.06 km^{2} (8.52 sq mi) with 2,237 families residing in it. The average female sex ratio was 1,010 lower than the state average of 1,084. In Karivedakam, 11.75% of the population was under 6 years of age. Karivedakam had an average literacy of 89.44% higher than the national average of 74% and lower than state average of 94%: male literacy was 92.60% and female literacy was 86.34%.

== Transportation ==
This village is connected to Karnataka state through Panathur. There is a 20 km road from Panathur to Sullia in Karnataka from where Bangalore and Mysore can be easily accessed. Locations in Kerala can be accessed by driving towards the western side. The nearest railway station is Kanhangad railway station on Mangalore-Palakkad line. There are airports at Mangalore and Calicut.
