= Neerchal, Kasaragod =

Neerchal
- Village
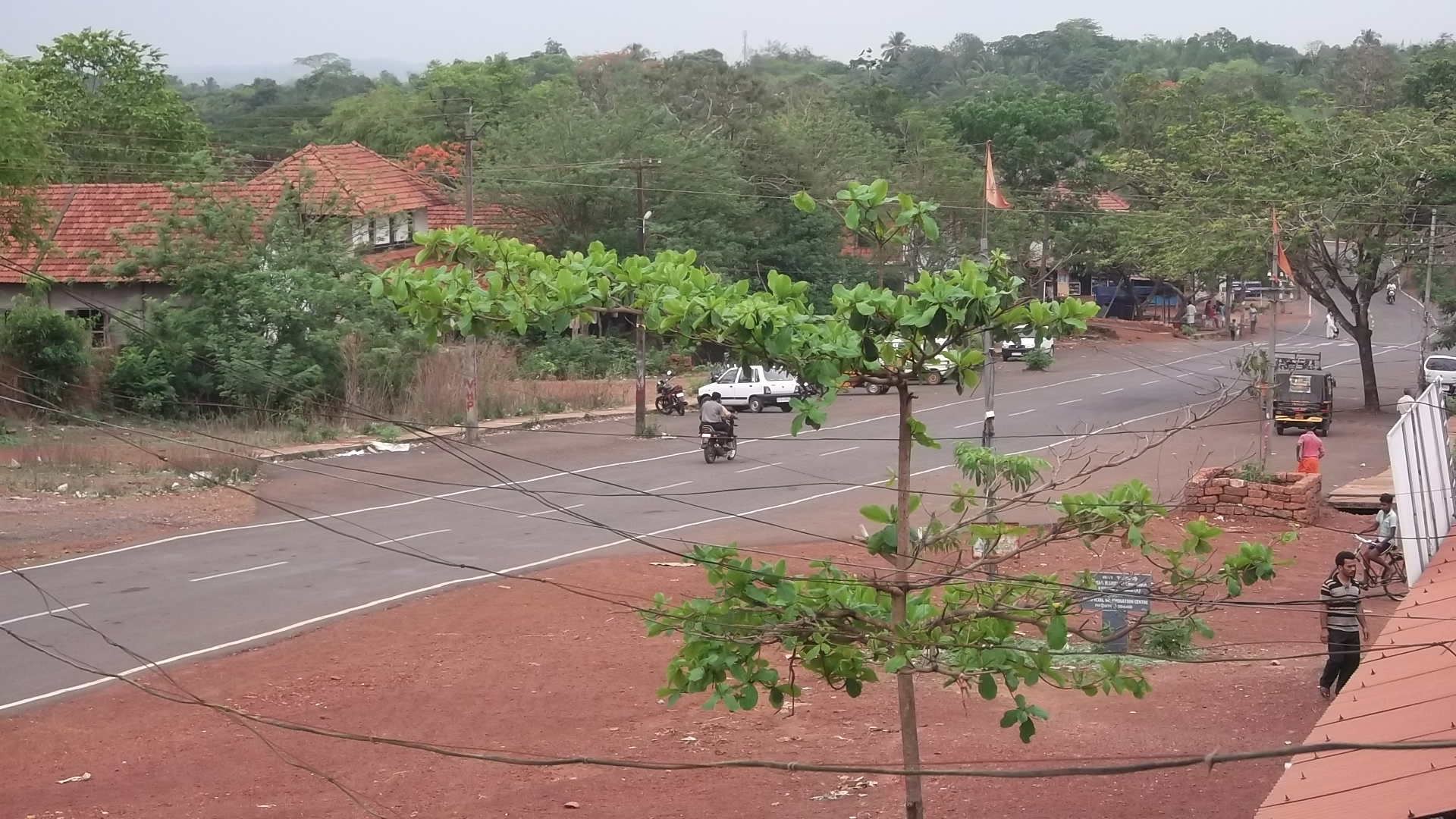
- Neerchal

- Location in Kerala, India Neerchal (India)
- Coordinates: 12.5884°N 75.0348°E
- Country: India
- State: Kerala
- District: Kasargod

Government
  - Body: Badiyadka Grama Panchayat

Area
  - Total: 21.54 km^{2} (8.32 sq mi)

Population (2011)
  - Total: 12,239
  - Density: 568.2/km^{2} (1,472/sq mi)

Languages
  - Official: Malayalam, English
- Time zone: UTC+5:30 (IST)
- PIN: 671321
- Telephone code: 04998-
- Vehicle registration: KL-14
- Nearest city: Kasaragod
- Lok Sabha constituency: Kasaragod
- Climate: 20c to 40c (Köppen)

Neerchal is a village in Kasaragod district of Kerala state, India. Neerchal is located 12 kilometers from Kasaragod.

== Demographics ==
As of 2011 Indian census, Neerchal village had total population of 12,369 which constitutes 6,223 males and 6,146 females. Neerchal village spreads over an area of 21.54 km^{2} (8.32 sq mi) with 2,352 families residing in it. The sex ratio of Neerchal was 988 lower than state average of 1,084. The population of children below 6 years was 11%. Neerchal had overall literacy of 89% lower than state average of 94%. The male literacy stands at 93.7% and female literacy at 84.4.%.

The Peradala Neerchal School is situated in this village. Neerchal belongs to Badiadka Grama Panchayath.
