= Periya, Kasaragod =

Village in Kasaragod District, Kerala, India

Coordinates: 12.407°N 75.096°E

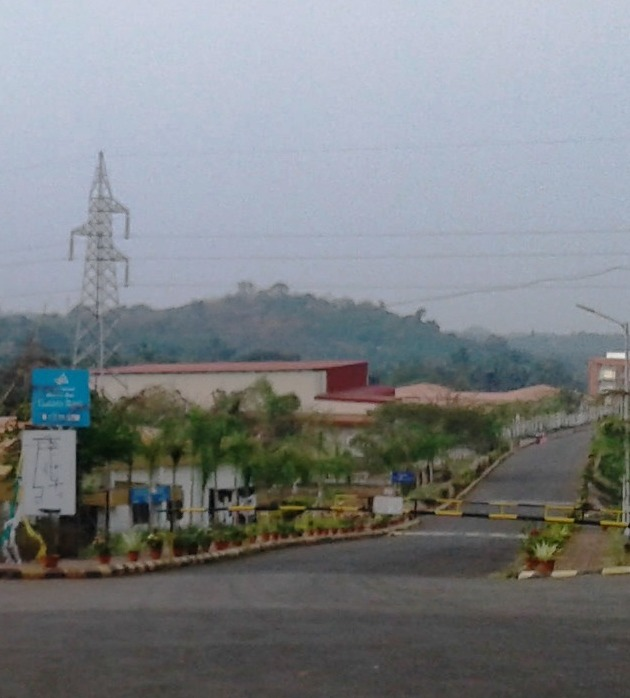
Central University

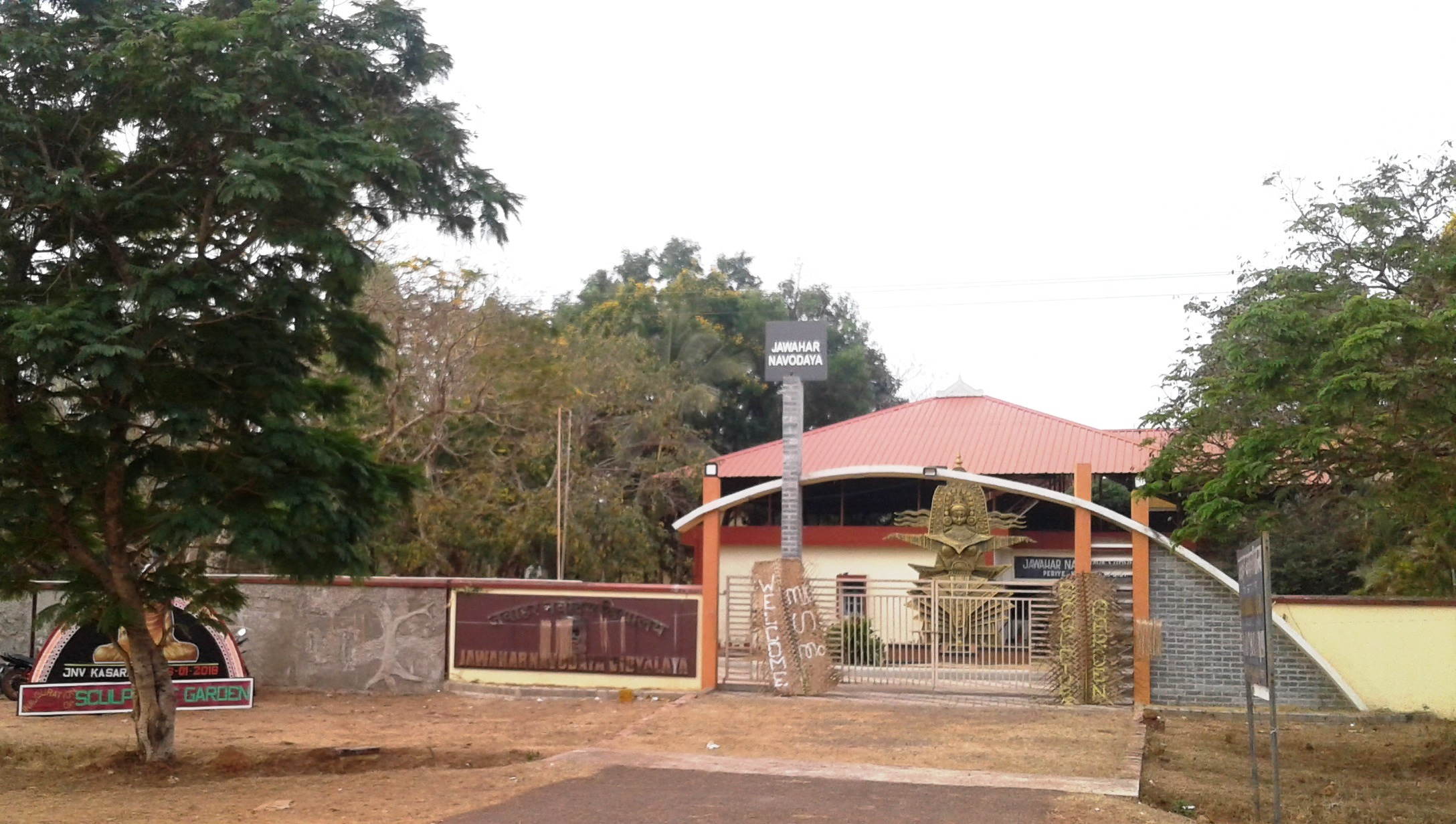
Navodaya School

Periya (also referred to as Periye) is a small township in Kasaragod District, Kerala State, India.

Periya is a small town located in Hosdurg of Kanhangad in the Kasaragod district, Kerala with total 3,100 families residing. The Periya village has population of 14,077 of which 6,718 are males while 7,359 are females as per Population Census 2011.

In Periya the population of children with age 0-6 is 1494 which makes up 10.61% of total population of village. Average Sex Ratio of Periya village is 1095 which is higher than Kerala state average of 1084. Child Sex Ratio for the Periya as per census 2011 is 989, higher than Kerala average of 964.

== Location ==
Periya is located between 14 km north of Kanhangad and 24 km south from Kasaragod on National Highway 66. The place has grown in prominence because of a large number of new organisations like Central University of Kerala, making Periya their home.

== Trivia ==
The village was the site of the killing of two Indian National Congress workers in 2019.

Bilal Masjid, Kuniya and Mahavishnu Temple, Ayambara in Periya have become a symbol of communal harmony and both have a shared arch entrance from National Highway.

== Suburbs and Villages ==
- Panayal, Thachangad, Chalingal and Kanjiradukkam
- Kundamkuzhy, Poinachi, Periyattadukkam and Kuniya
- Kannamvayal, Thachangad, Mavval and Bangad
- Maruthadukkam, Cherkkala, Thayyil and Chattanchal
- Kuniya, Cherumba, Periyattadukkam, Keloth, Pollakkada and Pullur Village
- Haripuram, Pullur, Moolakandam and Mavungal

== Prominent Organizations ==
- Central University of Kerala - Central University of Kerala is one of the 15 new universities constituted by the Government of India in 2009. The university has a 310-acre campus in Periya.
- Navodaya Vidyalaya, Kasaragod - Navodaya Vidyalaya is a model school run by the Government of India. It is affiliated to CBSE, New Delhi. Classes are conducted from Grade.VI to Grade XII. It is an autonomous and fully residential facility.
- Sree Narayana College of Arts and Management Periye.
- Ambedkar College of Education, Periye.
- Community Health Center Periye (CHC Periye)
- GHSS Periye
- Government Poly Technic College Periye
- SI-MET Nursing college run by Government of Kerala, Ayampara Periye
- Kerala Armed Police 4 Battalion- Detachment Camp Periye.
- Plantation corporation of Kerala Periye Division.

== Transportation ==
Local roads have access to NH.66 which connects to Mangalore in the north and Calicut in the south. The nearest railway station is Kanhangad on Mangalore-Palakkad line. There are airports at Mangalore and Kannur.

== Image gallery ==
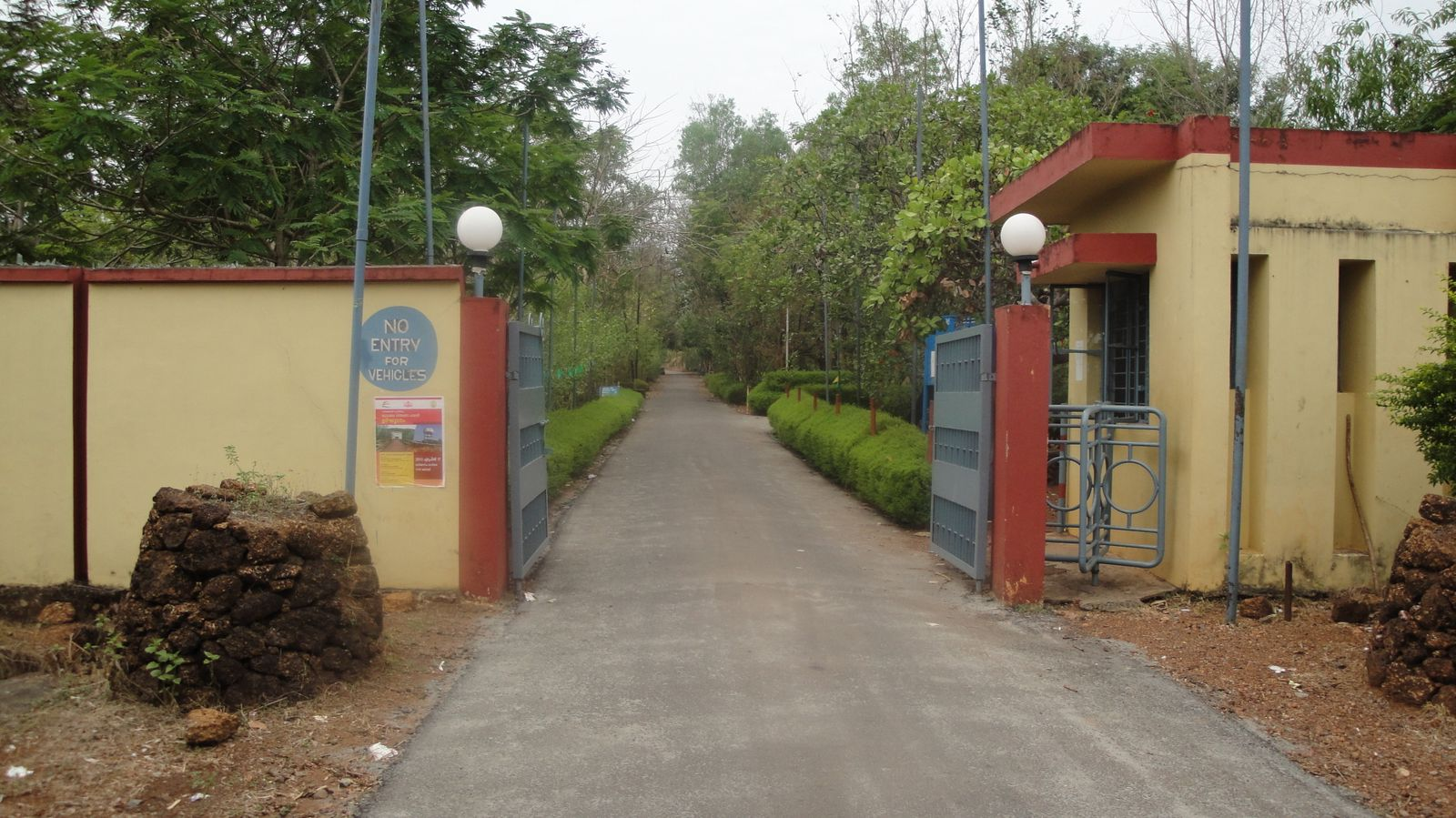
Navodaya School

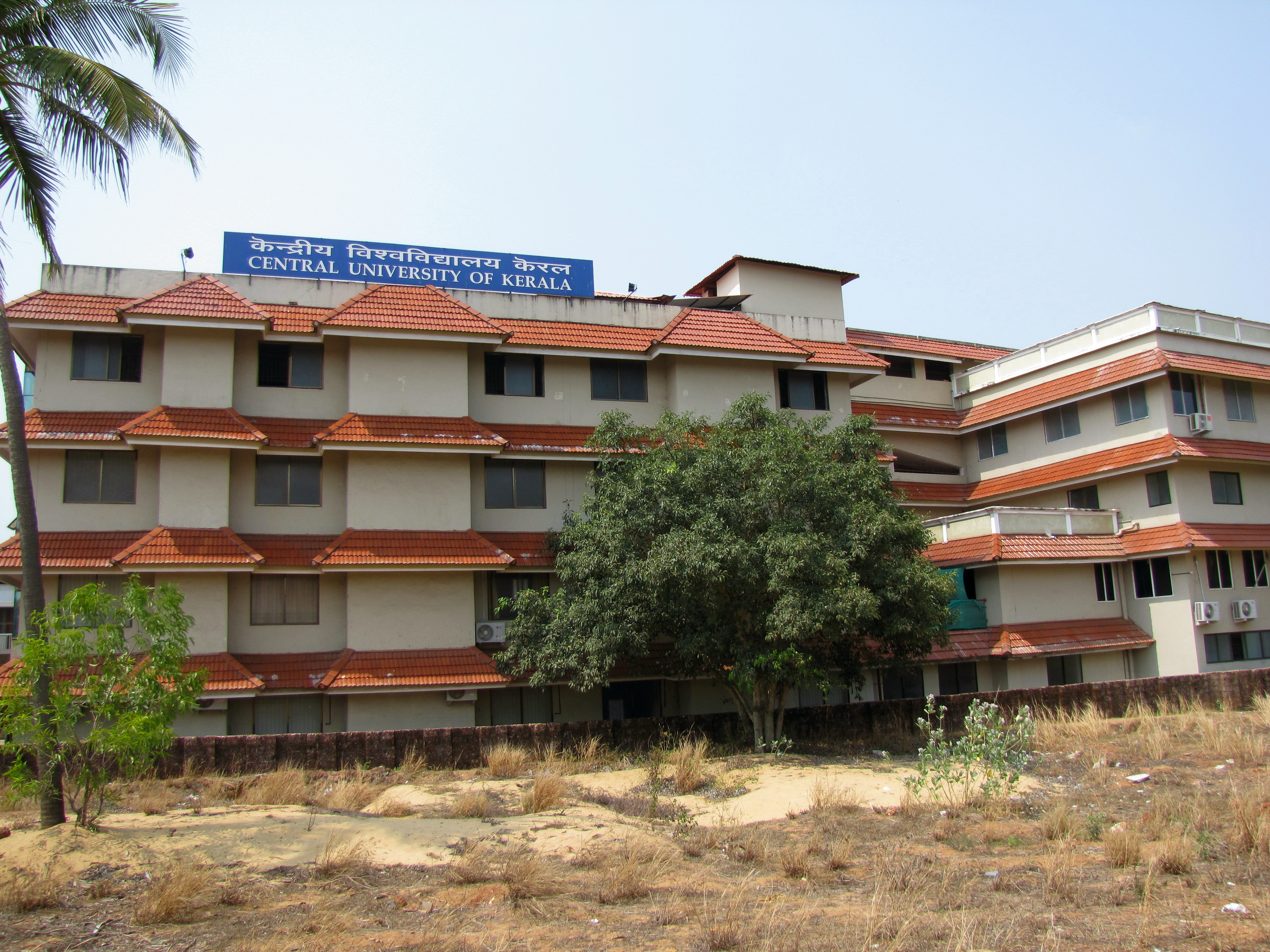
Central University

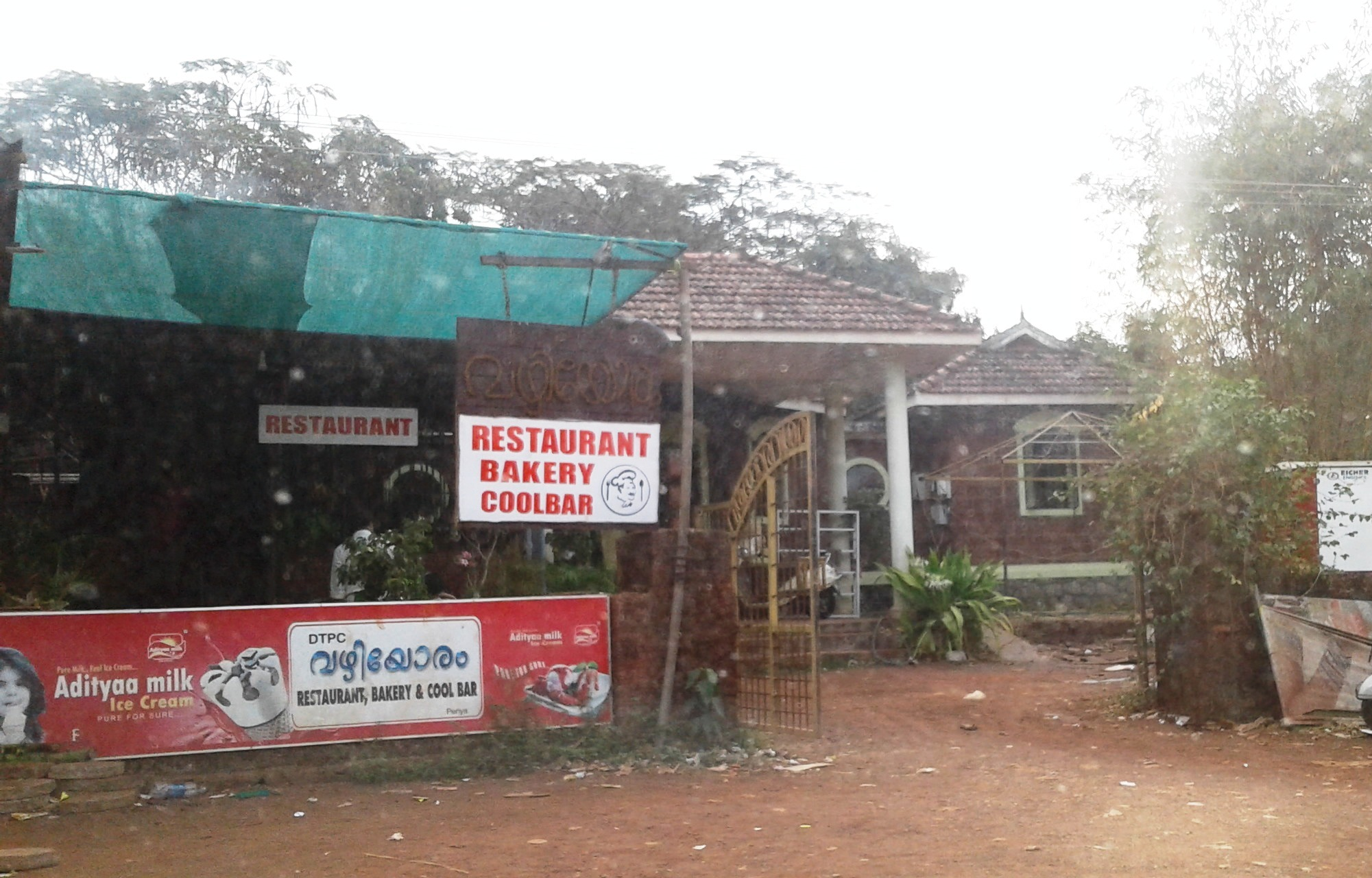
KTDC Vazhiyoram

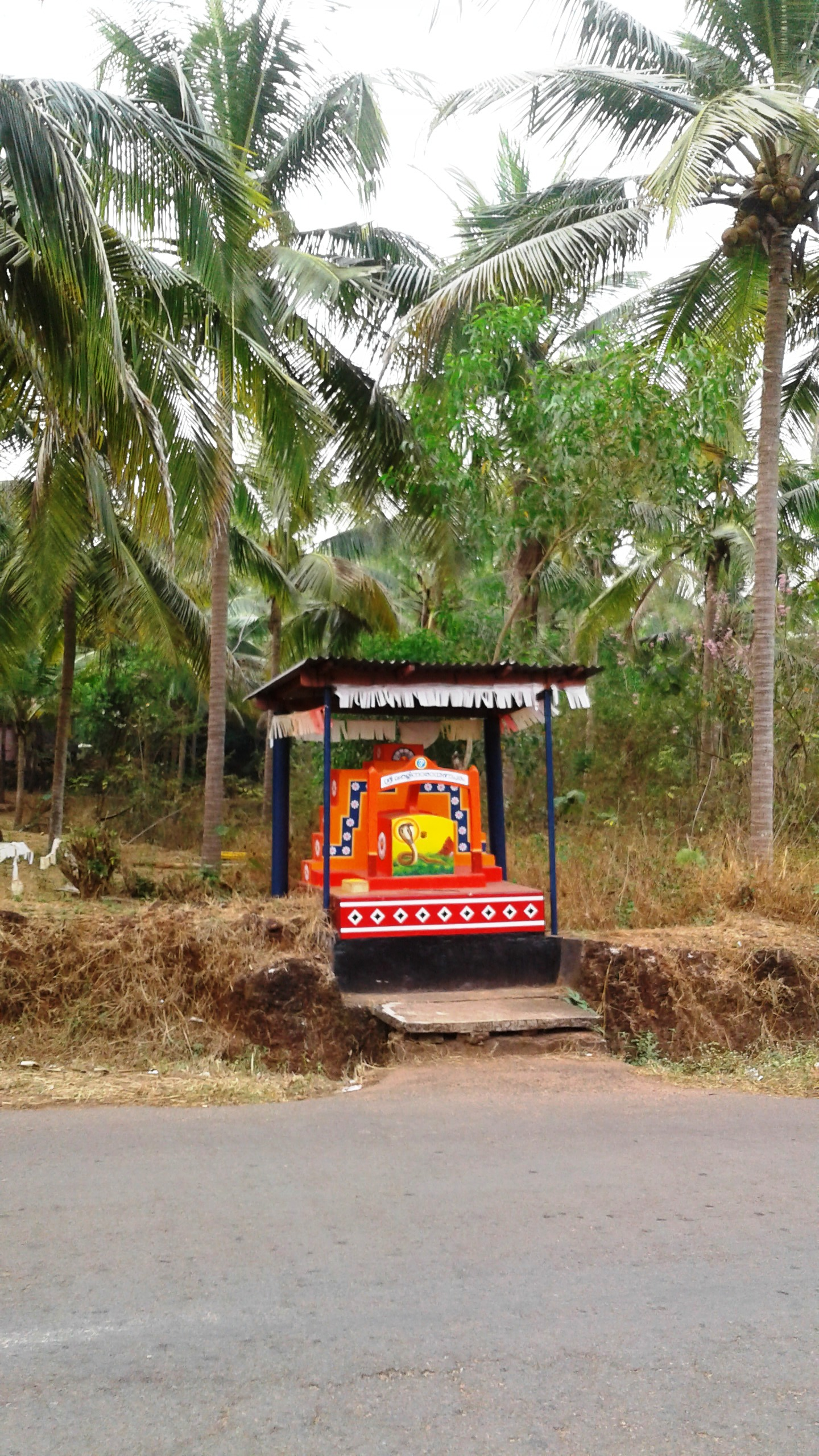
Deli Road

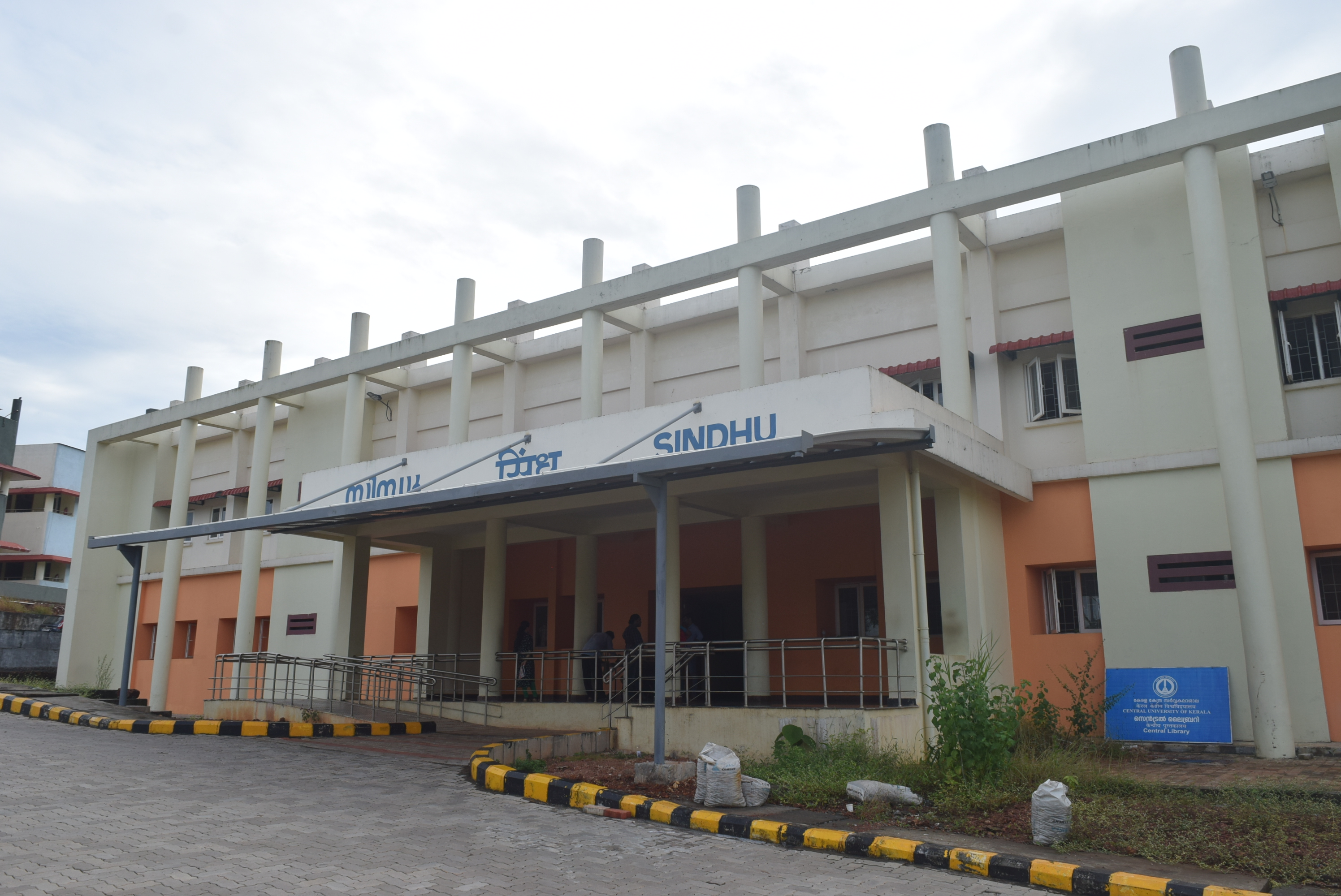

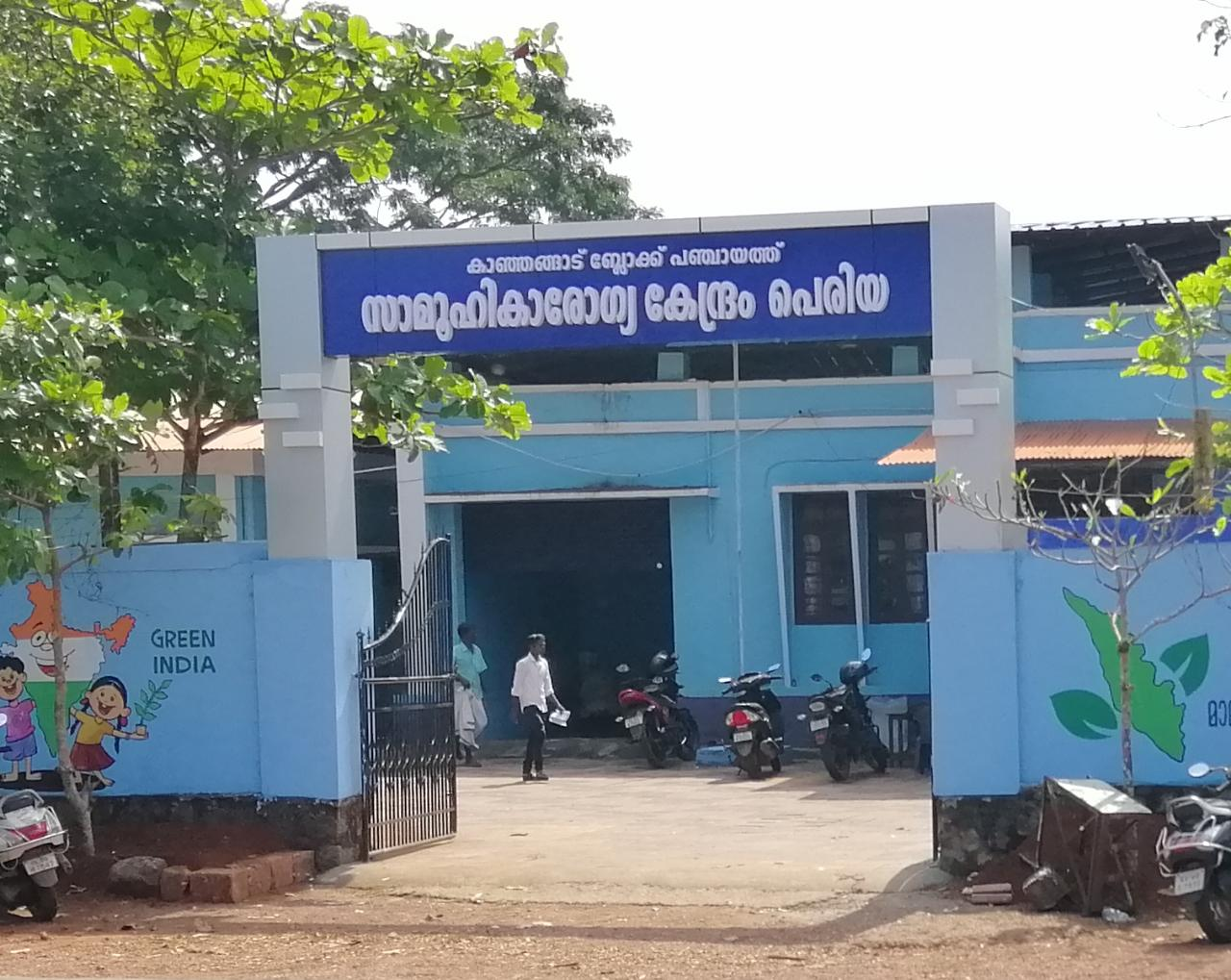
CHC Periye
