= Kolathur, Tiruvannamalai =

Village in Tamil Nadu, India

Kolathur
- Grama Panchayat (LGD Code - 231227)
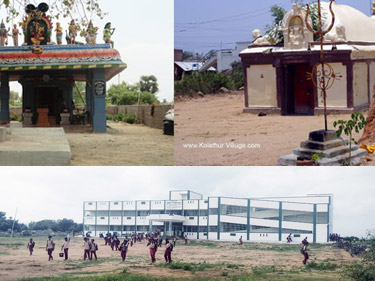
- Kolahtur Tiruvannamalai
- Nickname: Mathapoondi Kolathur
- Location in Tamil Nadu, India
- Coordinates: 12.17°N 79.20°E
- Country: India
- State: Tamil Nadu
- District: Tiruvannamalai

Languages
  - Official: Tamil
- Time zone: UTC+5:30 (IST)
- PIN: 606755
- Telephone code: 04175
- Vehicle registration: TN 25
- Website: http://www.kolathur.org

Kolathur is a village located in Kilpennathur Tehsil of Tiruvannamalai district in Tamil Nadu, India. Tiruvannamalai is the district and sub-district headquarters of Kolathur village. As per 2009 stats, Kolathur village is also a gram panchayat.

The total geographical area of the village is 727.25 hectares (1,797.1 acres). Kolathur has a total population of 2,160 people. There are about 530 houses in Kolathur. Kilpennathur, which is approximately 8 km (5.0 mi) away, is the nearest town.

== Sub villages in Kolathur ==
- Ponnankulam
- Erpakkam

== Census - demographic data ==
=== Population ===
- Total population - 3021
- Male - 1517
- Female - 1504

=== Child population(0-6 years) ===
- Total - 336
- Male - 179
- Female - 157

=== Scheduled Caste population ===
- Total - 781
- Male - 401
- Female - 380

=== Scheduled Tribe Population ===
- Total - 13
- Male - 8
- Female - 5

=== Literates population ===
- Total - 1744
- Male - 998
- Female - 746

=== Illiterates population ===
- Total - 1277
- Male - 519
- Female - 758

=== Workers population ===
- Total - 1749
- Male - 936
- Female - 813

=== Non-workers population ===
- Total - 1272
- Male - 581
- Female - 691

== Schools ==
- Government High School
- Government Elementary School
- Palvadi school

== Tourist palace in Tiruvannamali District ==
- Ramanar Ashram
- Javvadhu Hills
- Parvadha Hills
- Sathanur Dam
- Shenbaga Thoppu Dam
- Vedhapurishwarar Temple, Cheyyar

== Temple ==
- Arasumarathu Vinayagar Temple (Nadu Street)
- Muthalamman Temple (South Street)
- Kamatchi Amman Temple (South Street)
- Sri Maariyamman Temple (North Street)
- Kali Temple
- Ayyanar temple
- Putru Maariyamman Temple

 (Earpakkam Lake)

== Transport ==
- Public bus service - Available within village
- Private bus service - Available within village
- Railway station - Available within 12 km (7.5 mi) distance
