= Muttathody =

Muttathody hidayath nagar
- Village
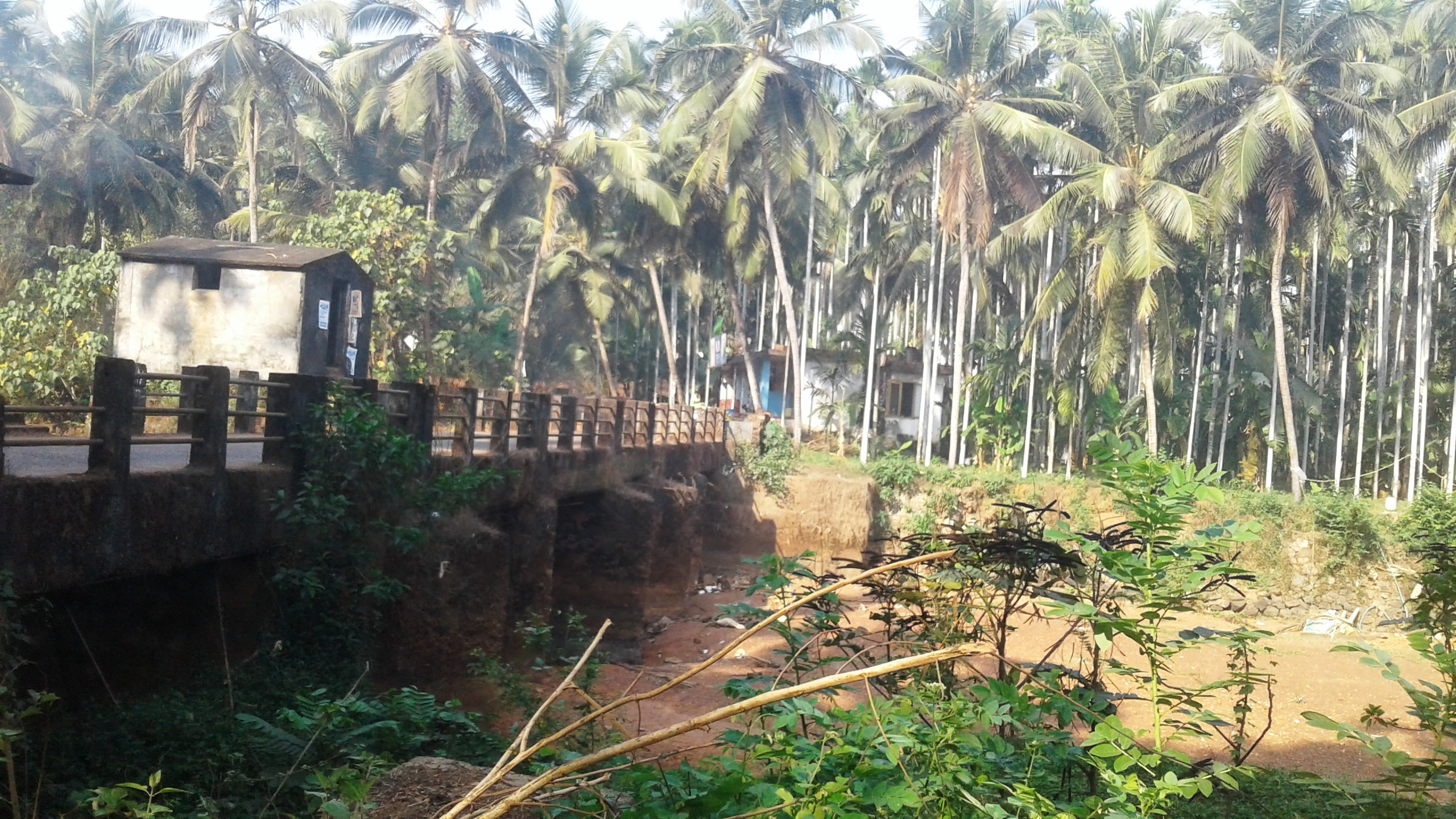
- Muttathody bridge
- Interactive map of Muttathody
- Coordinates: 12°32′30″N 75°1′10″E
- Country: India
- State: Kerala
- District: Kasaragod

Area
  - Total: 12.05 km^{2} (4.65 sq mi)

Population (2011)
  - Total: 20,658
  - Density: 1,714/km^{2} (4,440/sq mi)

Languages
  - Official: Malayalam, English
- Time zone: UTC+5:30 (IST)
- Vehicle registration: KL-

Muttathody is a village in the Kasaragod district of the Indian state of Kerala. It is located to the east of Kasaragod and to the northwest of Chengala, north of National Highway 66. The village is spread over 12.05 square kilometres (4.65 sq mi) of land.

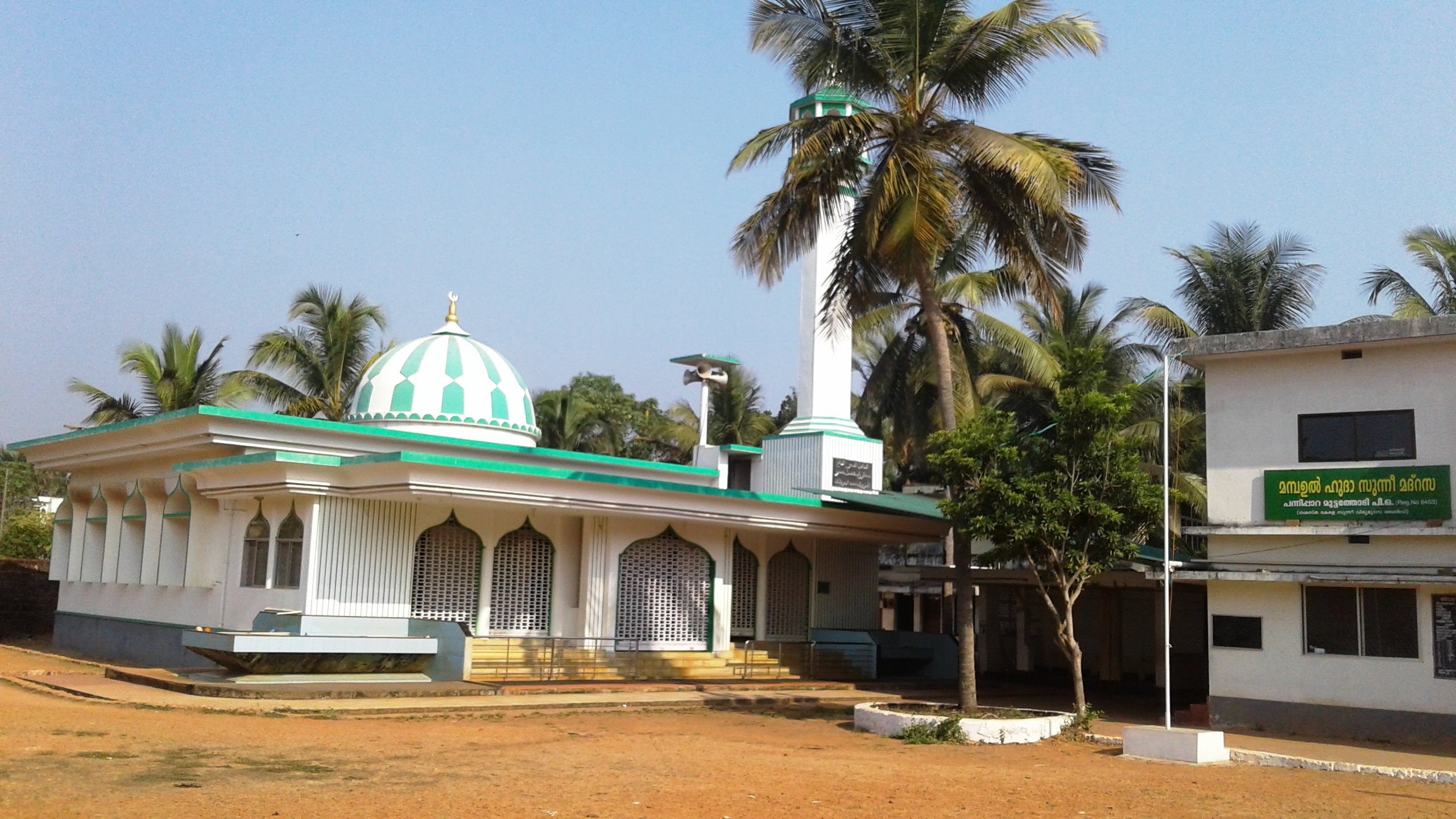
The Pannippara mosque in Muttathody

== Demographics ==
As of 2011, Muttathody had a population of 20,658 people living in 3,846 households. 10,057 of the population were male and 10,601 were female. 3,198 people, or about 15.5% of the population, were at or below the age of 6.
