= Karadka =

- Village
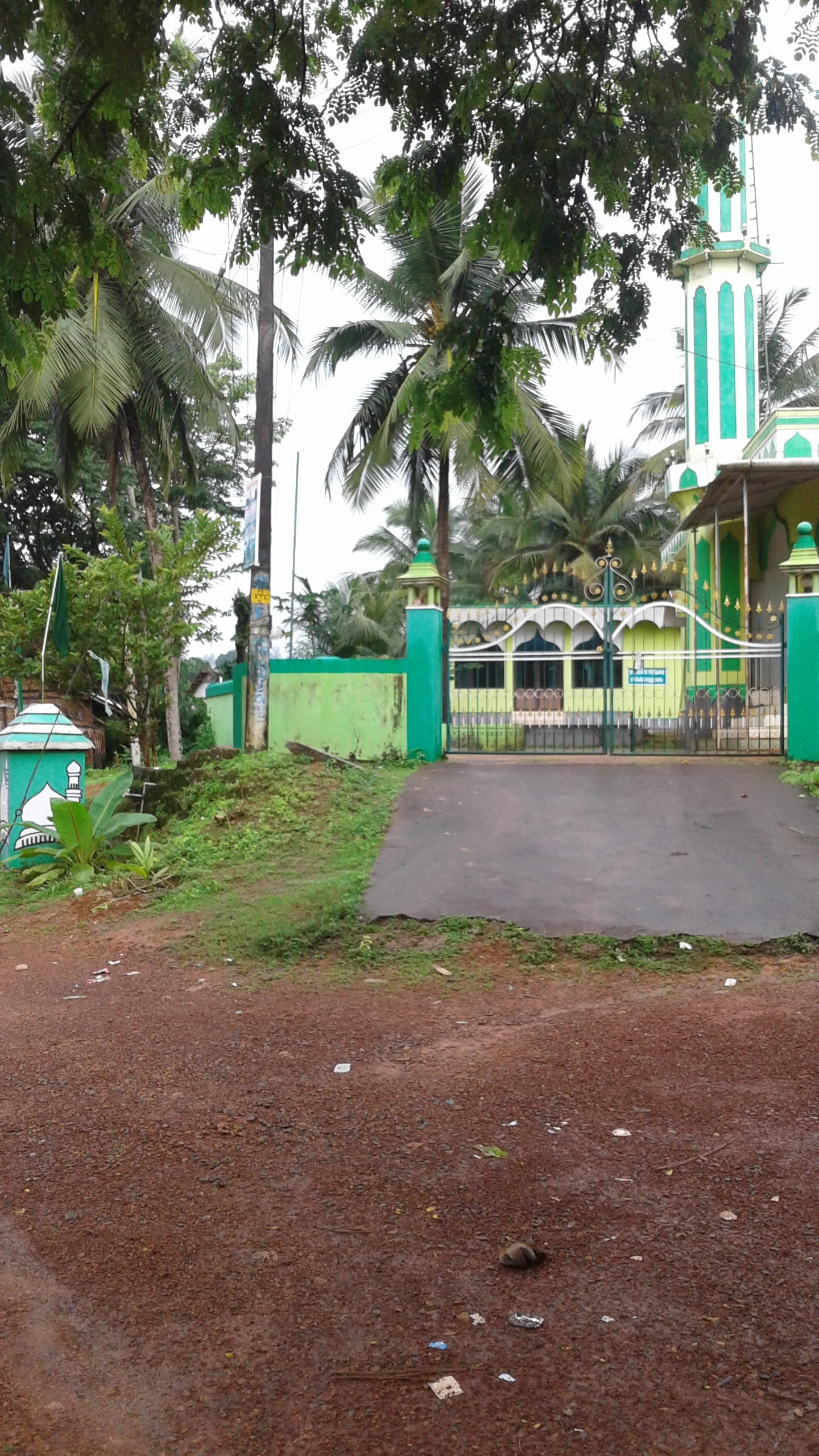
- Kundar Mosque, Karadukka

- Location in Kerala, India Karadka (India)
- Coordinates: 12°32′0″N 75°8′0″E
- Country: India
- State: Kerala
- District: Kasaragod

Government
  - Type: Panchayati Raj (India)
  - Body: Block Panchayat/Grama Panchayat

Area
  - Total: 18.59 km^{2} (7.18 sq mi)

Population (2011)
  - Total: 9,613
  - Density: 517.1/km^{2} (1,339/sq mi)

Languages
  - Official: Malayalam, English
- Time zone: UTC+5:30 (IST)
- PIN: 671542
- Telephone code: 0494
- Vehicle registration: KL-14
- Nearest city: Kasaragod
- Literacy: 89 %

Karadka is a village, block panchayat and grama panchayat in Kasaragod district in the state of Kerala, India.

== Demographics ==
As of the 2011 census, Karadka village had a population of 9,613, with 4,693 males and 4,920 females. Karadka village has an area of 18.59 km^{2} (7.18 sq mi) with 2,158 families residing in it. The average female sex was 1,048, lower than state average of 1,084. The population of children below 6 years was 9.67%. Karadka had an average literacy of 89.65%, higher than the national average of 74% and lower than the state average of 94.00%: male literacy was 94.3% and female literacy was 85.2%.

Karadka Grama Panchayat had a total population of 21,211 among which 10,535 are males and 10,676 are females. Total number of households in the panchayat limits was 4,265. 10.94% of the population was under 6 years of age in Karadka Panchayat. Karadka Grama Panchayat has administration over the villages of Karadka and Adhur.

== Administration ==
Karadka Grama Panchayat is part of Karadka Block Panchayat. Karadka Panchayat is politically a part of Kasaragod (State Assembly constituency) in Kasaragod (Lok Sabha constituency).

== Transportation ==
The western main road to Kasaragod have access to NH.66 which connects to Mangalore in the north and Calicut in the south. The road to the east connects to Sullia in Karnataka from where Mysore and Bangalore can be accessed. The nearest railway station is Kasaragod on Mangalore-Palakkad line. There is an airport at Mangalore.

== See also ==
- Adhur
- Mulleria
- Muliyar
- Delampady
