= Munnad =

- village
- Location in Kerala, India Munnad (India)
- Coordinates: 12°28′0″N 75°11′10″E
- Country: India
- State: Kerala
- District: Kasaragod

Government
  - Body: Bedadka Grama Panchayat

Area
  - Total: 31.31 km^{2} (12.09 sq mi)

Population (2011)
  - Total: 8,612
  - Density: 275.1/km^{2} (712.4/sq mi)

Languages
  - Official: Malayalam, English
- Time zone: UTC+5:30 (IST)
- PIN: 671541
- Vehicle registration: KL-14,KL-60

Munnad is a village in Kasaragod district in the state of Kerala, India.

== Transportation ==
This village is connected to Karnataka state through Panathur. The nearest railway station is Kanhangad railway station on the Mangalore-Palakkad line. There are airports at Mangalore, Kannur and Calicut.

== Demographics ==
As of 2011 Census, Munnad had a population of 8,612 with 4,111 males and 4,501 females. Munnad village has an area of 31.31 km^{2} (12.09 sq mi) with 1,989 families residing in it. The average female sex ratio was 1095 higher than the state average of 1084. 10.3% of the population was under 6 years of age. Munnad had an average literacy of 85% lower than the state average of 94%; male literacy was 89.65% and female literacy was 80.84%.

== Education ==
- People Institute of Management Studies, Munnad
