= Poinachi Junction =

Poinachi Pulinakshi
- town
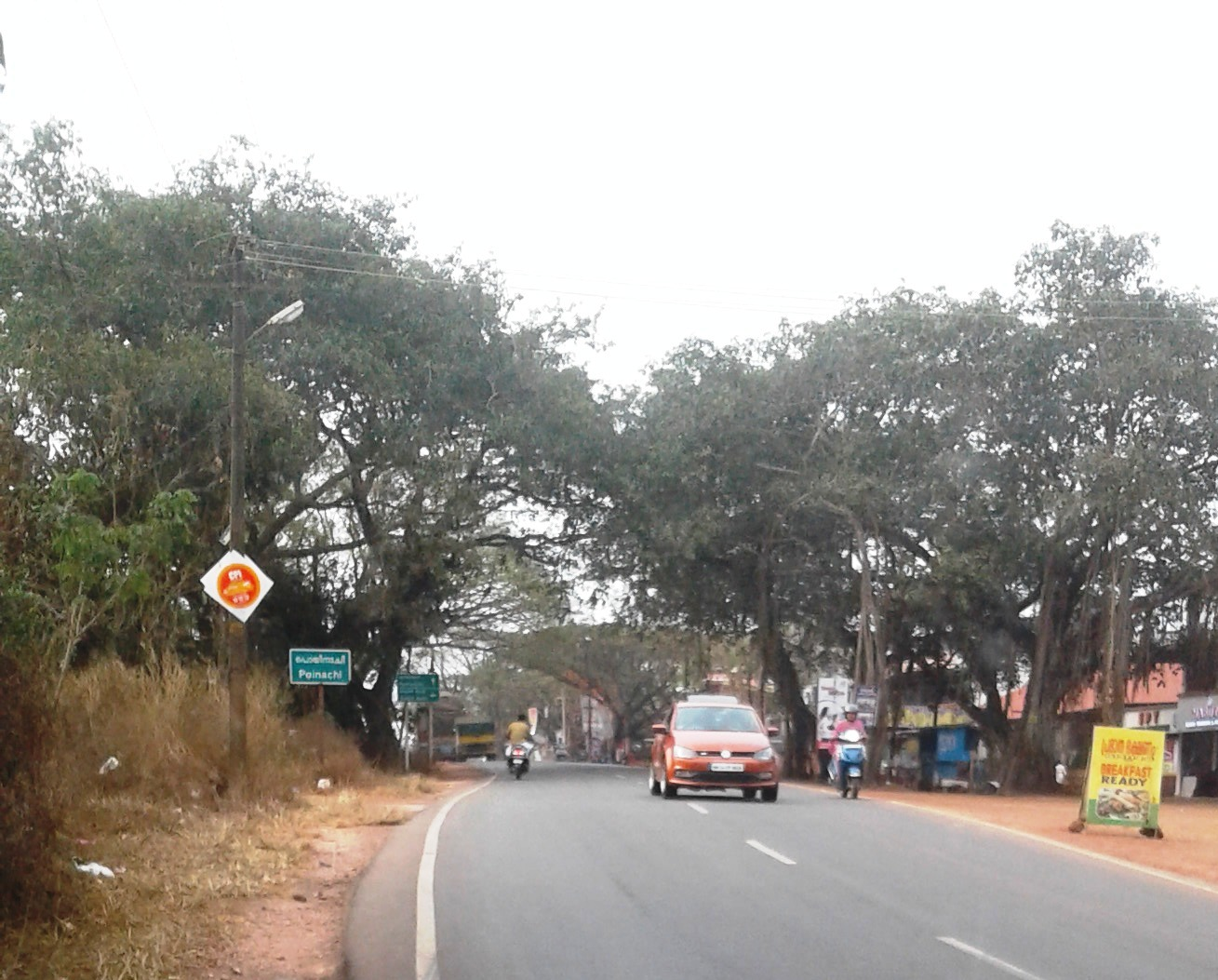
- Poinachi T-Junction
- Interactive map of Poinachi
- Coordinates: 12°27′30″N 75°3′45″E
- Country: India
- State: Kerala
- District: Kasaragod

Languages
  - Official: Malayalam, English
- Time zone: UTC+5:30 (IST)
- PIN: 671541
- Telephone code: 04994
- Vehicle registration: KL- 14
- Coastline: 0 kilometres (0 mi)
- Nearest city: Kasaragod

Poinachi is a small town on National Highway 66, about 16 km south of the town of Kasaragod, Kerala, India. It also serves as an origination point for a road running east to Bandadka.

== Transportation ==
National Highway 66 passes through Poinachi Junction, which connects to Mangalore in the north and Calicut in the south. The nearest railway station is Kanhangad on the Mangalore-Palakkad line. There are airports at Mangalore and Kannur.

== Image gallery ==
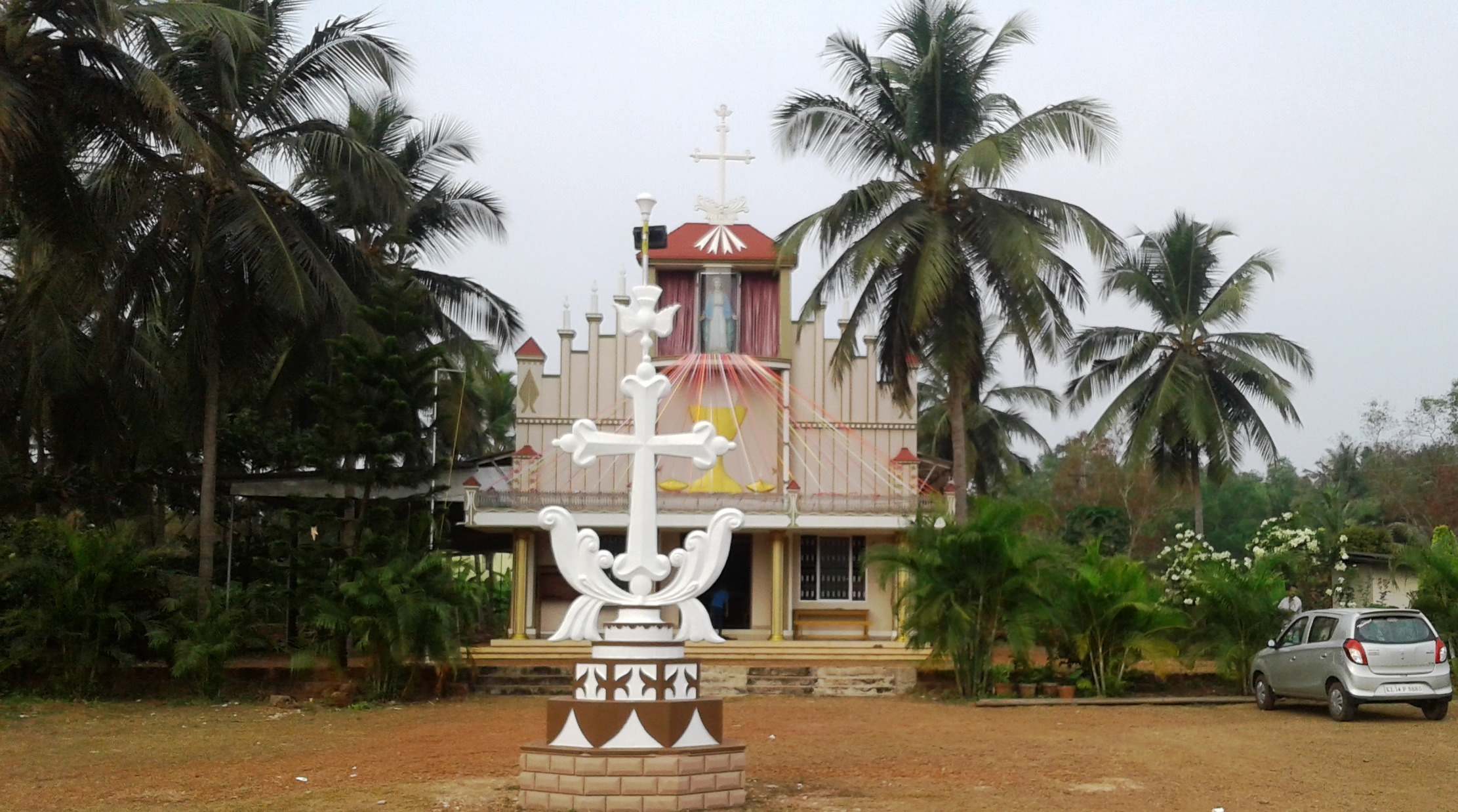
Poinachy Church

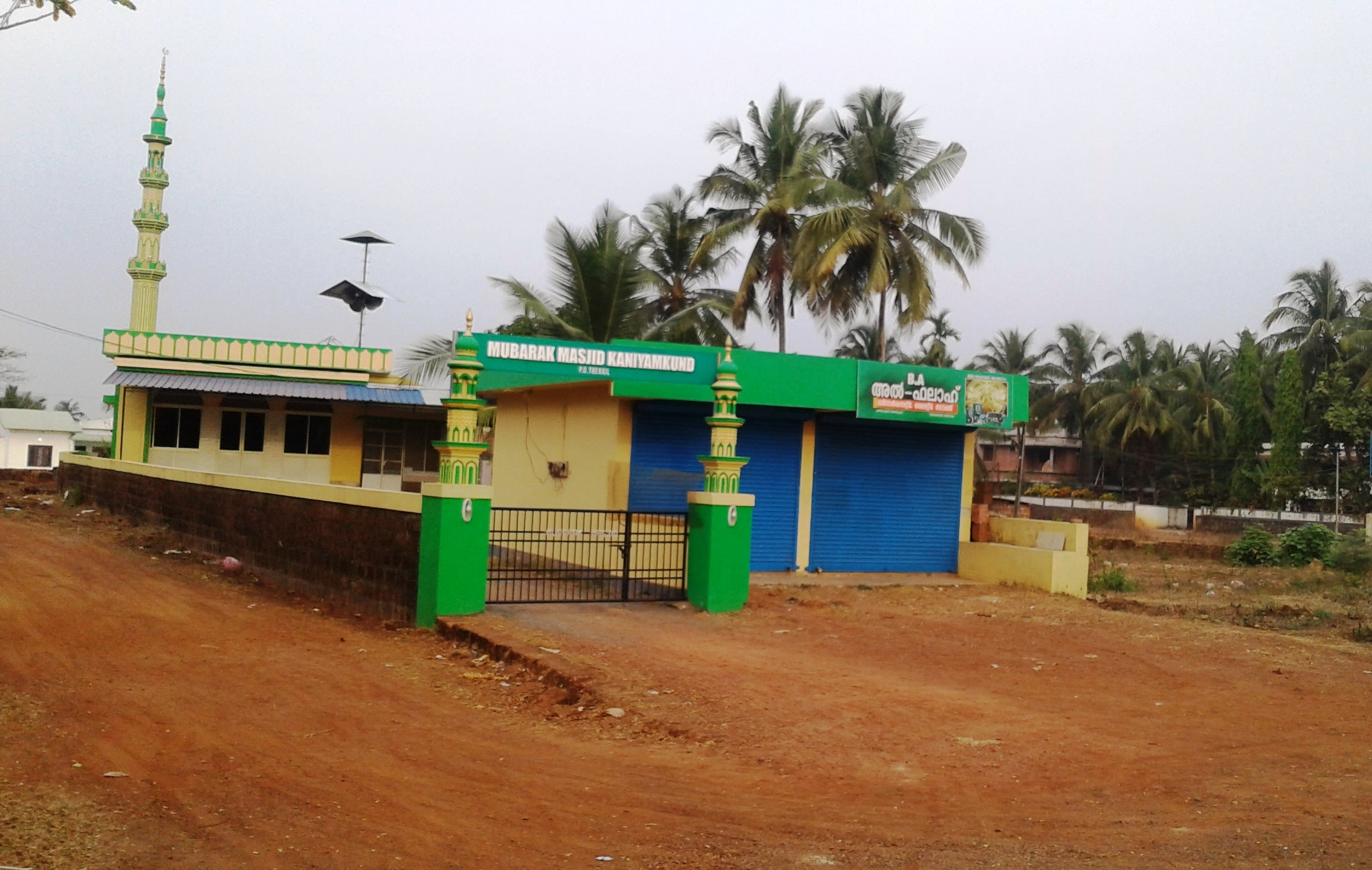
Benduchal Mosque

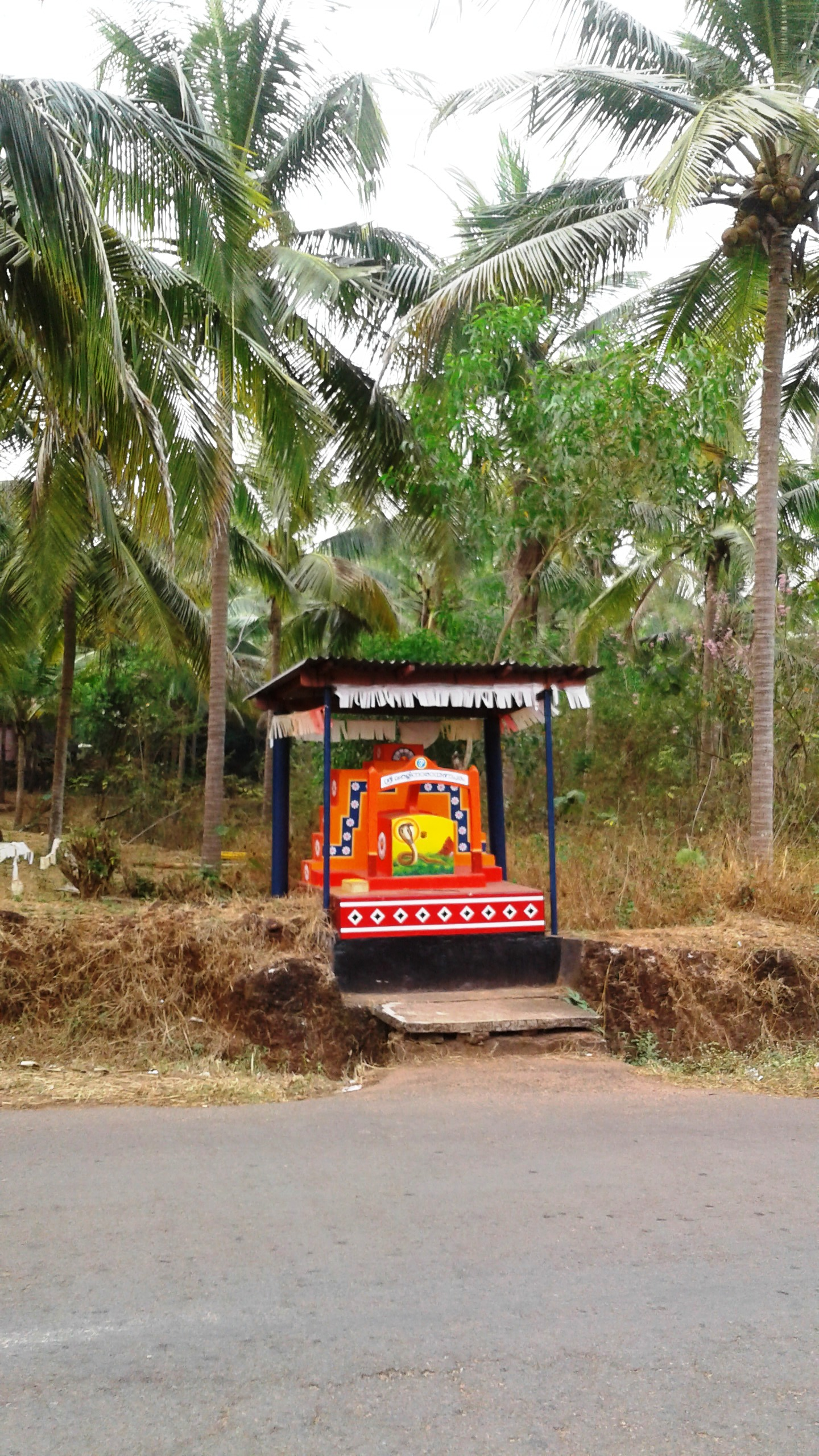
Deli Road
