= Kumbadaje =

- Village
- Location in Kerala, India
- Coordinates: 12°34′0″N 75°6′0″E
- Country: India
- State: Kerala
- District: Kasaragod

Government
  - Type: Panchayati Raj (India)
  - Body: Kumbadaje Grama Panchayat

Area
  - Total: 26.25 km^{2} (10.14 sq mi)

Population (2011)
  - Total: 11,161
  - Density: 425.2/km^{2} (1,101/sq mi)

Languages
  - Official: Malayalam, English
- Time zone: UTC+5:30 (IST)
- PIN: 671551
- Vehicle registration: KL-14

Kumbadaje is a village in Kasaragod district in the state of Kerala, India.

== Demographics ==
As of 2011 Census, Kumbadaje had a population of 11,161 with 5,588 males and 5,573 females. Kumbadaje village has an area of 26.25 km^{2} (10.14 sq mi) with 2,085 families residing in it. In Kumbadaje, 11.9% of the population was under 6 years of age. Kumbadaje had an average literacy of 86.23% higher than the national average of 74% and lower than the state average of 94%: male literacy was 91.63% and female literacy was 80.8%. Belinja is a hamlet in Kumbadaje village.
