= Adoor (Kasaragod) =

Village in Kerala, India

Adhur
- village
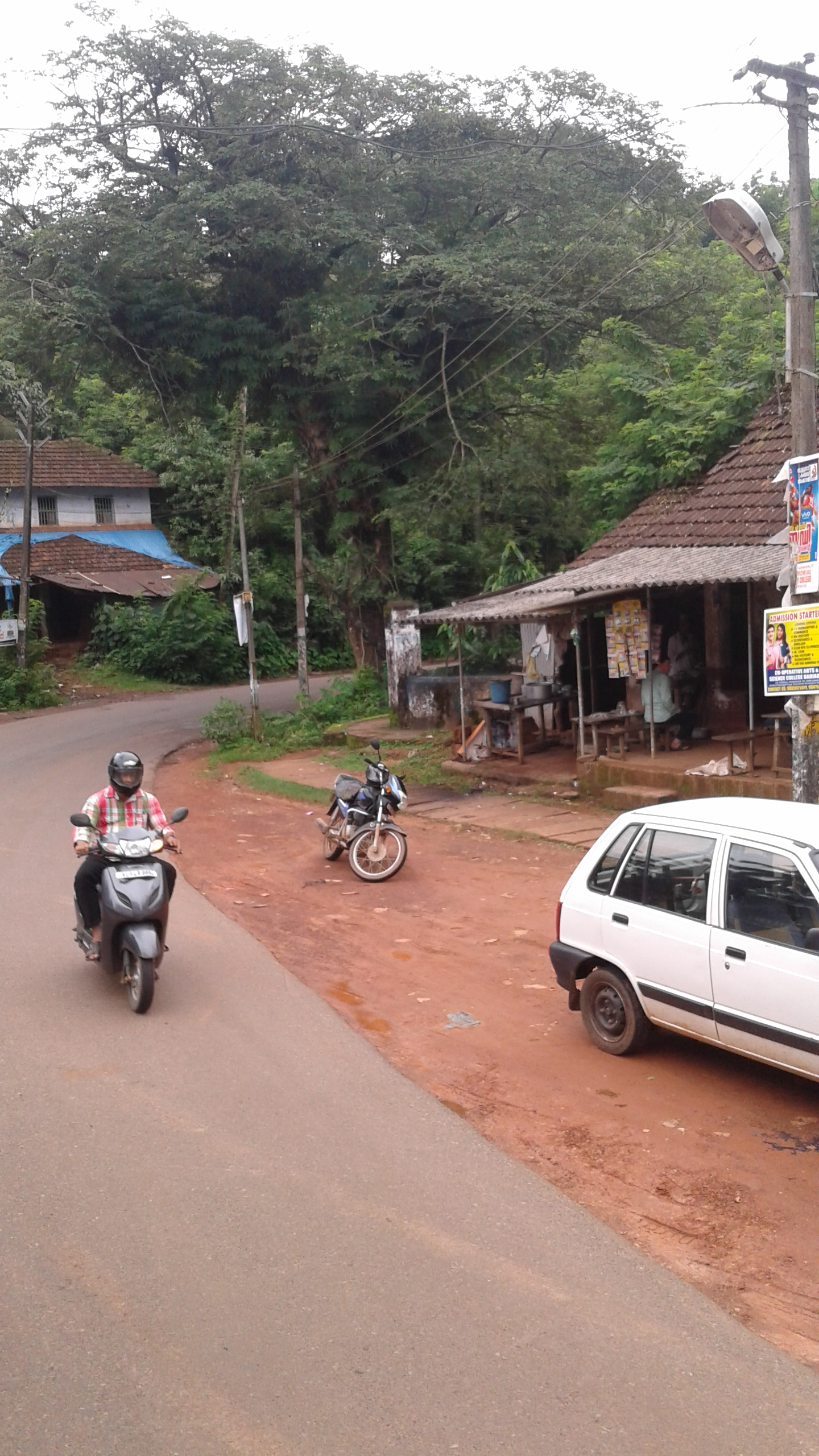
- Aadhur Town

- Location in Kerala, India Adhur (India)
- Coordinates: 12.558270°N 75.1357400°E
- Country: India
- State: Kerala
- District: Kasaragod
- Taluk: Kasaragod

Government
  - Body: Karadka Grama Panchayat

Area
  - Total: 22.58 km^{2} (8.72 sq mi)

Population (2011)
  - Total: 11,598
  - Density: 513.6/km^{2} (1,330/sq mi)

Languages
  - Official: Malayalam, English
- Time zone: UTC+5:30 (IST)
- PIN: 671543
- Vehicle registration: KL-14

Adoor is a village in Kasaragod district in the Indian state of Kerala. Adoor is located 38 km east of Kasaragod town and 7 km away from State Highway 55 or Cherkala-Jalsoor road.

== Demographics ==
As of 2011 Census, Adoor village had population of 15,482 which constitutes 7,667 males and 7,815 females. Adoor village spreads over an area of 34.17 km^{2} (13.19 sq mi) with 3,057 families residing in it. The sex ratio of Adoor was 1019 lower than state average of 1084. Population in the age group 0-6 was 1,710 (11%) where 911 are males and 799 are females. Adoor had an overall literacy of 83.2% lower than state average of 94%. The male literacy was 88.2% and female literacy was 78.4%.

== Administration ==
Adoor village is part of Delampady Grama Panchayat under Karadka block panchayat. The village is politically part of Kasaragod (State Assembly constituency) under Kasaragod Loksabha.

== Transportation ==
National Highway 66 passes through Kasaragod town which connects Goa and Mumbai on the northern side and Kochi and Thiruvananthapuram on the southern side. Cherkala-Jalsoor interstate highway gives access to cities and towns of neighbouring Karnataka state.

The nearest railway station is at Kasaragod on Shoranur-Mangalore Section under Southern railways.

The nearest international airports are Kannur and Mangalore.
