= Badiyadka =

Badiyadka Perdala
- Town
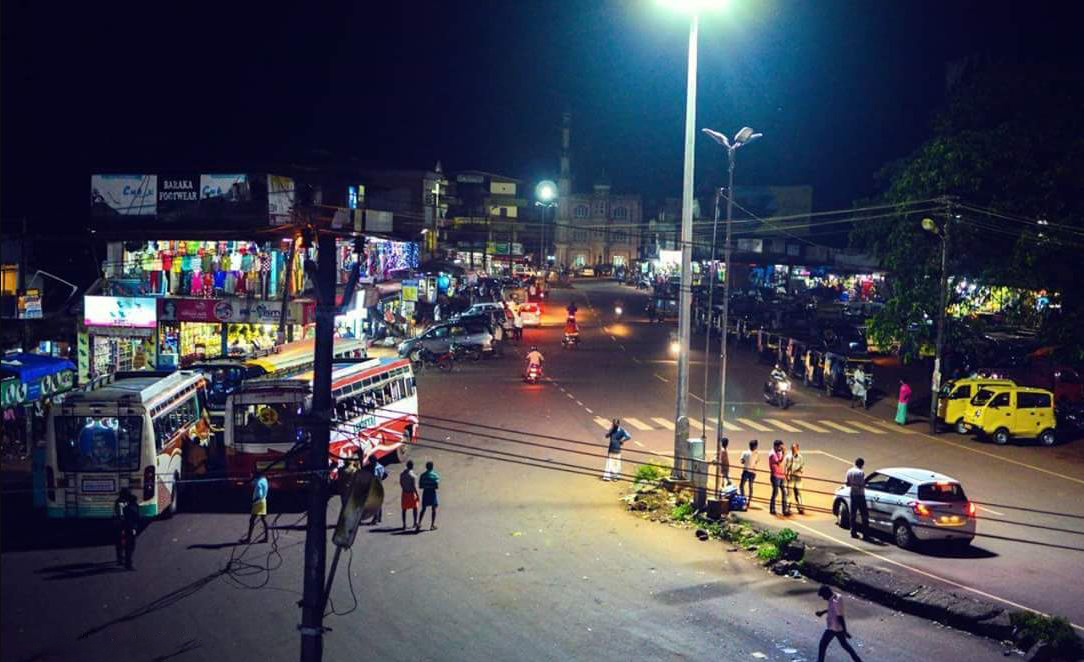
- Badiyadka Town

- Location in Kerala, India Badiyadka (India)
- Coordinates: 12°35′0″N 75°4′0″E
- Country: India
- State: Kerala
- District: Kasaragod
- Taluk: Kasaragod

Government
  - Body: Badiyadka Panchayat

Area
  - Total: 67.8 km^{2} (26.2 sq mi)

Population (2011)
  - Total: 34,207
  - Density: 505/km^{2} (1,310/sq mi)

Languages
  - Official: Malayalam, Kannada, English
- Time zone: UTC+5:30 (IST)
- PIN: 671551
- Telephone code: 04998 (Peradala Exchange, Uppala SDE)
- Vehicle registration: KL-14,
- Nearest city: Kasaragod (18 km)
- Lok Sabha constituency: Kasaragod
- Vidhan Sabha constituency: Kasaragod

Badiyadka, officially known as "Badiadka" (also known as "Perdala"), is a town and gram panchayat in the Kasaragod district, state of Kerala, India.

It is located 14 km northeast of the district headquarters Kasaragod, 18 km northeast of the taluk headquarters Kasaragod, 16 km east of Kumbla and 32 km southeast of Manjeshwar.

== Climate ==
Badiyadka has a tropical climate. In most months of the year, there is significant rainfall in Badiyadka. There is only a short dry season and it is not very effective. The Köppen-Geiger climate classification is Am. The average annual temperature in Badiyadka is 27.1 °C. About 3801 mm of precipitation falls annually.

The driest month is January with 1 mm. Most precipitation falls in July, with an average of 1178 mm.

The warmest month of the year is April with an average temperature of 29.2 °C. In July, the average temperature is 25.9 °C. It is the lowest average temperature of the whole year.

Climate Table
Month	Jan	Feb	Mar	Apr	May	Jun	Jul	Aug	Sep	Oct	Nov	Dec	Year
Average high °C (°F)	31 (88)	31 (88)	32 (90)	33 (91)	32 (90)	29 (84)	28 (82)	28 (82)	29 (84)	30 (86)	31 (88)	32 (90)	33 (91)
Average low °C (°F)	22 (72)	23 (73)	24 (75)	26 (79)	26 (79)	24 (75)	24 (75)	24 (75)	24 (75)	24 (75)	23 (73)	22 (72)	22 (72)
Average rainfall mm (inches)	1 (0.04)	1 (0.04)	4 (0.16)	46 (1.81)	234 (9.21)	992 (39.06)	1,178 (46.38)	698 (27.48)	337 (13.27)	215 (8.46)	76 (2.99)	19 (0.75)	3,801 (149.65)
Average rainy days(≥ 0.1 mm)	0	0	1	3	10	26	30	26	20	13	6	1	136
Averagerelative humidity(%)	62	66	68	71	71	87	89	88	85	79	73	65	75

== Demographics ==
As of 2011 Census, Badiyadka village had a population of 10,694 of which constitutes 5,320 males and 5,374 females. Badiyadka village spreads over an area of 23.47 km^{2} (9.06 sq mi) with 2,117 families residing in it. Average sex ratio of Badiyadka was 1,010 lower than state average of 1,084. The population of children under 6 years was 1,191 which makes up 11.1% of total population. Child sex ratio for Badiyadka as per census is 946, lower than state average of 964. Badiyadka village had lower literacy rate compared to Kerala. In 2011, literacy rate of Badiyadka village was 88.3% compared to 94.00% of Kerala. The male literacy stands at 92.9% while female literacy rate was 82.8%.

Badiyadka Grama Panchayat had total population of 34,207 where 16,988 are males and 17,219 are females. There are 6,744 families residing in badiyadka panchayat limits. Badiyadka panchayat consists of 3 revenue villages like Badiyadka, Neerchal and Bela. Average literacy of Badiyadka panchayat is 88.36% where male literacy stands at 92.85% and female literacy at 83.93%.

== Administration ==
- District: Kasargod
- Taluk/Tehsil: Kasaragod
- Block: Kasaragod
- Assembly Constituency: Kasaragod
- Parliament Constituency: Kasargod
- Police Station: Badiyadka
- Post Office: 671551
- Telephone Exchange: Perdala. 04998
- Nearest Railway Station: Kasaragod

== See also ==
- Bekal
- Kasaragod District
- Perla
- Uppala
