= Udma Assembly constituency =

Constituency of the Kerala legislative assembly in India

Udma
- Constituency No. 3 for the Kerala Legislative Assembly
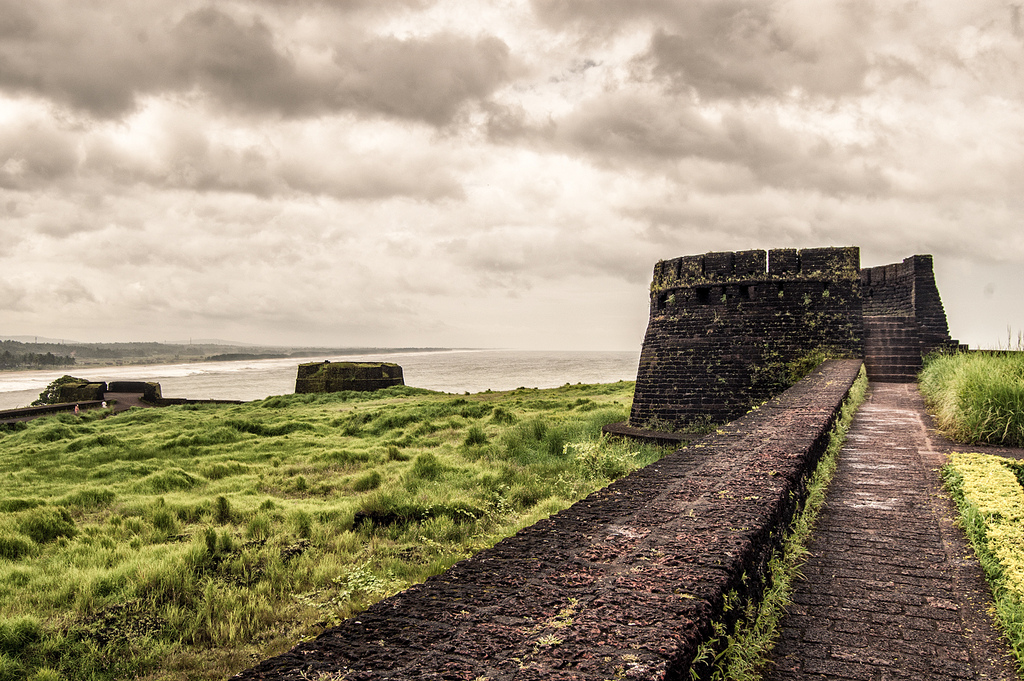
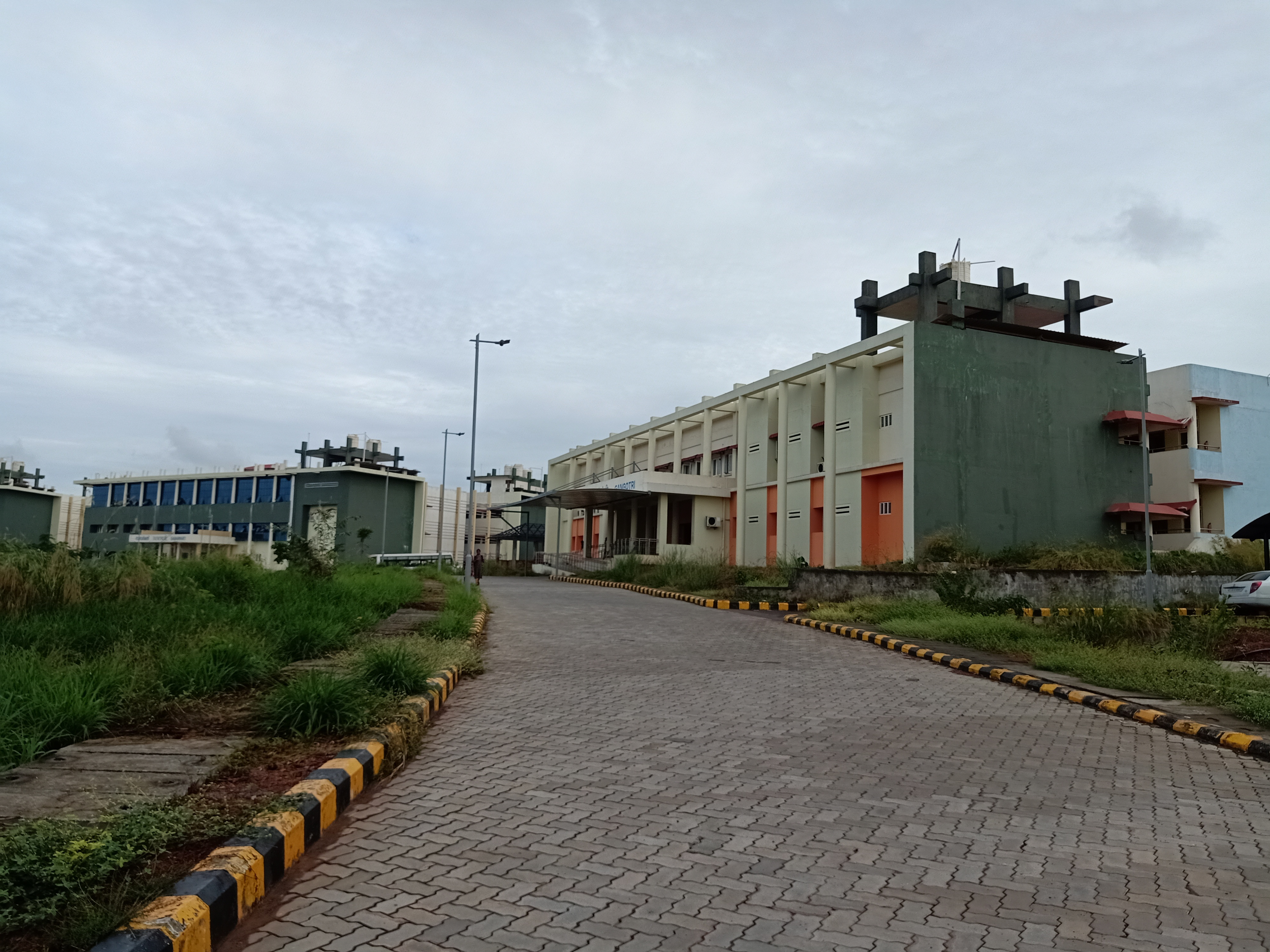
- Top to bottom: Bekal Fort, the largest fort in Kerala at Pallikkara, The Central University of Kerala at Periya.

Constituency details
- Country: India
- Region: South India
- State: Kerala
- District: Kasaragod
- Established: 1977
- Total electors: 2,14,209 (2021)
- Reservation: None

Member of Legislative Assembly
- 16th Kerala Legislative Assembly
- Incumbent K. Neelakandan
- Party: Indian National Congress
- Alliance: UDF
- Elected year: 2026

Udma State assembly constituency is one of the 140 state legislative assembly constituencies in Kerala in southern India. It is also one of the seven state legislative assembly constituencies included in Kasaragod Lok Sabha constituency. As of the 2026 Assembly elections, the current MLA is K. Neelakandan of Indian National Congress.

== Local self-governed segments ==
Udma Assembly constituency is composed of the following local self-governed segments:

Sl no.	Name	Status (Grama panchayat/Municipality)	Taluk
1	Bedadka	Grama panchayat	Kasaragod
2	Chemnad	Grama panchayat	Kasaragod
3	Delampady	Grama panchayat	Kasaragod
4	Kuttikole	Grama panchayat	Kasaragod
5	Muliyar	Grama panchayat	Kasaragod
6	Pallikkara	Grama panchayat	Hosdurg
7	Pullur-Periya	Grama panchayat	Hosdurg
8	Udma	Grama panchayat	Hosdurg

== Members of Legislative Assembly ==
The following list contains all members of Kerala Legislative Assembly who have represented the constituency:

Key

CPI(M) Independent INC

Election	Niyamasabha	Member	Party	Tenure
1977	5th	N. K. Balakrishnan	Ind.	1977 – 1980
1980	6th	K. Purushottaman	CPI(M)	1980 – 1982
1982	7th	M. Kunhiraman Nambiar	Ind.	1982 – 1985
1985*	7th	K. Purushottaman	CPI(M)	1985-1987
1987	8th	K. P. Kunhikannan	INC	1987 – 1991
1991	9th	P. Raghavan	CPI(M)	1991 – 1996
1996	10th	P. Raghavan	CPI(M)	1996 – 2001
2001	11th	K. V. Kunhiraman	CPI(M)	2001 – 2006
2006	12th	K. V. Kunhiraman	CPI(M)	2006 – 2011
2011	13th	K. Kunhiraman	CPI(M)	2011 – 2016
2016	14th	K. Kunhiraman	CPI(M)	2016 – 2021
2021	15th	C. H. Kunhambu	CPI(M)	2021 – 2026
2026	16th	K. Neelakandan	INC	2026 – present

*by-election

== Election results ==
=== 2026 ===
2026 Kerala Legislative Assembly election: Udma
Party	Candidate	Votes	%	±%
INC	K. Neelakandan	78,910	43.83	▲4.31
CPI(M)	C. H. Kunhambu	74,063	41.14	▼6.44
BJP	Manulal Meloth	26,899	14.94	▲2.63
Independent	Kunhambu P. P.	191	0.11	
Independent	Kunhiraman	138	0.08	
Independent	Naseer	111	0.06	
NOTA	None of the above	504	0.29	▲0.03
Margin of victory		4,847	2.69	▼5.37
Turnout		1,80,816	78.90	▲1.59
INC gain from CPI(M)		Swing	▲4.31	

Local Body	Booth Rows	UDF Votes	LDF Votes	NDA/BJP Votes	Leading Front	Lead	UDF Booth Leads	LDF Booth Leads	NDA Booth Leads	Tied Booths
Chemnad	44	19,684	10,130	5,067	UDF	9,554	29	11	4	0
Muliyar	24	9,116	5,860	2,947	UDF	3,256	15	7	2	0
Delampady	22	5,038	5,235	3,031	LDF	197	10	8	4	0
Udma	30	10,301	8,402	2,702	UDF	1,899	17	11	2	0
Pallikkara	44	14,212	14,041	3,248	UDF	171	21	22	1	0
Bedadka	29	7,580	13,438	3,365	LDF	5,858	6	23	0	0
Pullur-Periya	23	6,151	8,038	2,614	LDF	1,887	8	14	1	0
Kuttikole	22	6,002	7,716	3,576	LDF	1,714	11	10	1	0
TOTAL	238	78,084	72,860	26,550	UDF	5,224	117	106	15	0

=== 2021 ===
There were 2,14,209 registered voters in the constituency for the 2021 election.

2021 Kerala Legislative Assembly election: Udma
Party	Candidate	Votes	%	±%
CPI(M)	C. H. Kunhambu	78,664	47.58	▲3.64
INC	Periya Balakrishnan	65,342	39.52	▼2.03
BJP	A. Velayudhan	20,360	12.31	▼0.89
NOTA	None of the above	434	0.26	
Independent	Rameshan K.	207	0.13	▲0.01
API	Govindan B. Alinthazhe	194	0.12	▲0.02
Independent	Kunhanbu K.	140	0.08	
Margin of victory		13,322	8.06	
Turnout		1,65,341	77.31	
CPI(M) hold		Swing	▲3.64	

=== 2016 ===
There were 1,99,962 registered voters in the constituency for the 2016 election.

2016 Kerala Legislative Assembly election: Udma
Party	Candidate	Votes	%	±%
CPI(M)	K. Kunhiraman	70,679	43.94	▼3.99
INC	K. Sudhakaran	66,487	41.55	▲2.47
BJP	K. Shreekanth	21,231	13.20	▲3.04
NOTA	None Of the Above	405	0.25	−
PDP	Gopi Kuthirakallu	353	0.22	▼0.29
Independent	Damodaran P.	349	0.22	−
SDPI	Mohammed Pakyara	331	0.21	▼0.77
Independent	Sudhakaran Cherukulam	208	0.13	−
API	Govindan B. Alinthakhe	165	0.10	−
Independent	Abbas Mothalappara	157	0.10	−
Independent	K. Kunhiraman Periyanganam	145	0.09	−
Margin of victory		3,882	2.39	▼6.46
Turnout		1,60,870	80.45	▲6.30
CPI(M) hold		Swing	▼3.99	

=== 2011 ===
There were 1,73,459 registered voters in the constituency for the 2011 election.

2011 Kerala Legislative Assembly election: Udma
Party	Candidate	Votes	%	±%
CPI(M)	K. Kunhiraman	61,646	47.93	
INC	C. K. Sreedharan	50,266	39.08	
BJP	Sunita Prasanth	13,073	10.16	
SDPI	Faisal Koliyadukkam	1,265	0.98	
BSP	P. Damodaran	1,096	0.85	
Independent	Krishnankutty	866	0.67	−
Independent	Kunhiraman	414	0.32	
Margin of victory		11,380	8.85	
Turnout		1,28,626	74.15	
CPI(M) hold		Swing		

== See also ==
- Udma
- Kasaragod district
- List of constituencies of the Kerala Legislative Assembly
- 2016 Kerala Legislative Assembly election
