= Eniyadi =

- city
- Location in Kasaragod, Kerala, India
- Coordinates: 12°30′7″N 75°15′52″E
- Country: India
- State: Kerala
- Region: Malabar
- District: Kasaragod

Government
  - Body: Kuttikol Grama Panchayath

Population (2011)
  - Total: 1,000+

Languages
  - Official: Malayalam, English, Kannada
- Time zone: UTC+5:30 (IST)
- PIN: 671541
- Telephone code: 04994, +91
- Vehicle registration: KL-14, KL-60
- Nearest Town: Bandadka
- Climate: cool pleasant (Köppen)
- Website: www.

Eniyadi is a small village in Kuttikol Panchayath and near Bandaduka Town in the Kasaragod. Eniyadi Maqam is a religious place of Muslims. Eniyadi is about 1 kilometre (0.6 mi) from Thayal Eniyadi to Bandaduka Town.

== Sports ==
Major sports are soccer, cricket and volleyball.

== Holy Places ==
- Badar Juma Masjid
- Eniyadi Maqam
- Noorul Islam Madrassa

== Clubs ==
- New Green Star arts and sports club

== Nearby Places ==
- Thayal Eniyadi
- Bandaduka Town
