= Pallikkara =

Pallikkara may refer to:

- Pallikkara, Bekal, a village in Kasaragod district, India
- Pallikkara, Payyoli, a village in Kozhikode district, India
