= Thayal Eniyadi =

- village
- Location in Kasaragod, Kerala, India Thayal Eniyadi (India)
- Coordinates: 12°30′57″N 75°15′26″E
- Country: India
- State: Kerala
- District: Kasaragod

Government
  - Body: Kuttikol Grama Panchayath

Population (2014)
  - Total: 500+

Languages
  - Official: Malayalam, English
- Time zone: UTC+5:30 (IST)
- PIN: 671541
- Telephone code: 04994
- Vehicle registration: KL-14, KL-60
- Nearest Town: Bandadka
- Climate: cool pleasant (Köppen)
- Website: www.facebook.com/pages/Thayal-Eniyadi/950602551622422

Thayal Eniyadi is a place that comes under Bandadka village and Kuttikol panchayath. In Thayal Eniyadi there is a mosque named New Badar Masjid. This mosque comes under Eniyadi Juma Masjid. About 500 people live in Thayal Eniyadi. Nearby there is a religious place Eniyadi Maqam.

== Religious Centers ==
- New Badar Masjid

== Nearby places ==
- Moola
- Kappana
- Villaram vayal
- Kundoochy

== Demographics ==
As of 2001 India census, Thayal Eniyadi had a population of 500+.

== Transportation ==
This village is connected to Karnataka state through Panathur. There is a 20 km road from Panathur to Sullia in Karnataka from where Bangalore and Mysore can be easily accessed. Locations in Kerala can be accessed by driving towards the western side. The nearest railway station is Kanhangad railway station on Mangalore-Palakkad line. There are airports at Mangalore and Calicut.
