= Kakkachal =

Village in Kerala, India

Coordinates: 12.48455°N 75.27389°E

Kakkachal is a place that comes under Bandadka village and Kuttikol panchayath in Kasaragod District of Kerala State, India.

== Churches ==
In Kakkachal there is a Christian church named St Jude's Church (Choorithod). This church comes under Maripuram parish.

== Demographics ==
About 500 people are living in Kakkachal.

== Transportation ==
This village is connected to Karnataka state through Panathur. There is a 20 km road from Panathur to Sullia in Karnataka from where Bangalore and Mysore can be easily accessed. Locations in Kerala can be accessed by driving towards the western side. The nearest railway station is Kanhangad railway station on Mangalore-Palakkad line. There are airports at Mangalore and Calicut.
