= K. Neelakandan =

Indian politician

Krishnan Nair Neelakandan (born 1964) is an Indian politician from Kerala. He represents the Indian National Congress from the Udma State assembly constituency in the 16th Kerala Assembly. He won the 2026 Kerala Legislative Assembly election.

== Early life and education ==
Neelakandan is from Kasargod, Kerala. He is the son of Krishnan Nair. He completed his graduation in arts at the Government College, Kasaragod which is affiliated with the University of Calicut in 1987. He declared assets worth Rs.1 crore in his affidavit to the Election Commission of India.

== Career ==
Neelakandan won from Udma Assembly constituency in the 2026 Kerala Legislative Assembly election representing the Indian National Congress. He polled 78,910 votes and defeated his nearest rival, C H Kunhambu of the Communist Party of India (Marxist), by a margin of 4,847 votes. Congress was part of the United Democratic Front and UDF reclaimed the seat after 39 years.
