= 1991 Kerala Legislative Assembly election =

State assembly election in India

1991 Kerala Legislative Assembly Election
- June 18, 1991

All 140 seats in the Kerala Legislative Assembly 71 seats needed for a majority
- Turnout: 73.42% (▼7.12)
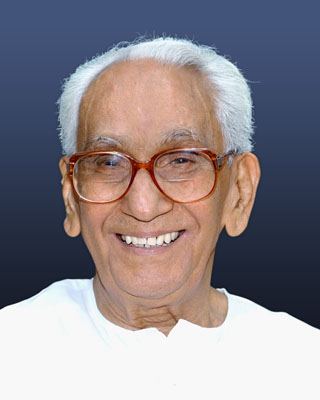

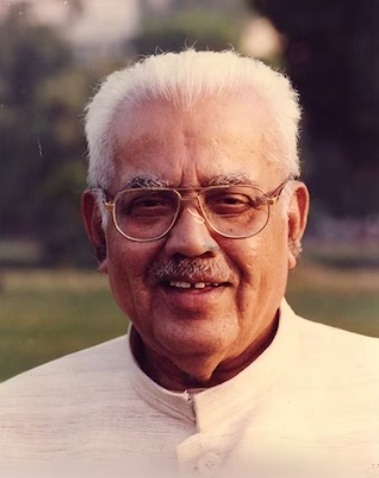
	First party	Second party
Leader	K. Karunakaran	E. K. Nayanar
Party	INC	CPI(M)
Alliance	UDF	LDF
Leader's seat	Mala	Thrikaripur Assembly constituency
Last election	33	38
Seats won	55	28
Seat change	▲22	▼10
- Kerala, India; Kerala, one of the states in South India, has an electorate of more than 21 million people.

- Alliance wise structure
Chief Minister before election
E. K. Nayanar
CPI(M)
Elected Chief Minister
K. Karunakaran
INC

The 1991 Kerala Legislative Assembly election was held on 18 June 1991 to elect members to the Niyamasabha. The incumbent LDF government, which was in power from 1987, decided to seek a fresh mandate one year ahead of the expiry of its term. The decision was prompted by the announcement of the elections to the Lok Sabha and the Front's good showing in the elections to the local bodies held in the previous year.

The elections saw the LDF losing power and the UDF returning to power after four years. K. Karunakaran, the leader of the UDF alliance, was sworn in as the Chief Minister of the state on 24 June 1991.

This was the final election in which the two major fronts were led by K. Karunakaran and E. K. Nayanar respectively.

== Results ==
Kerala Assembly Election Results in 1991.

Party Wise Results
Party	Seats
Indian National Congress (INC)	55
Communist Party of Indian (Marxist) (CPI(M))	28
Muslim League (MUL)	19
Communist Party of India (CPI)	12
Kerala Congress (M) (KCM)	10
Janata Dal (JD)	3
Indian Congress (Socialist-Sarat Chandra Sinha) ICS(SCS)	2
Revolutionary Socialist Party (RSP)	2
National Democratic Party (NDP)	2
Kerala Congress (KEC)	1
Communist Marxist Party (CMP)	1
Communist Marxist Party of India (CPM)(K)	1
Independent (IND)	4
Total	140

Detailed constituency-wise Results
Sl No.	Constituency Name	Category	Winner Candidates Name	Gender	Party	Vote	Runner-up Candidates Name	Gender	Party	vote	Margin	Winner
1	Manjeshwar	GEN	Cherkalam Abdullah	M	MUL	29603	K.G. Marar	M	BJP	28531	1072	IUML
2	Kasaragod	GEN	C.T. Ahamdali	M	MUL	39143	Sri Krishna Bhat	M	BJP	24269	14874	IUML
3	Udma	GEN	P. Raghavan	M	CPI(M)	47169	K.Po. Kunhikannan	M	INC	46212	957	CPI(M)
4	Hosdrug	(SC)	M. Narayanan	M	CPI	60536	Kottara Vasudev	M	INC	53858	6678	CPI
5	Trikaripur	GEN	E.K. Nayanar	M	CPM	69437	Sreedharan C.K.	M	INC	55105	14332	CPI(M)
6	Irikkur	GEN	K.C. Joseph	M	INC	62395	Goorge Sebastian	M	KEC	45647	16748	INC
7	Payyannur	GEN	C.P. Narayanan	M	CPM	66530	M.P. Murali	M	INC	48365	18165	CPI(M)
8	Taliparamba	GEN	Pacheni Kunhiaraman	M	CPM	65973	M.K. Raghavan	M	INC	55273	10700	CPI(M)
9	Azhikode	GEN	E.P. Jayarajan	M	CPM	51466	C.P. Moosankutty	M	CPM(K)	43757	7709	CPI(M)
10	Cannanore	GEN	N. Ramakrishnan	M	INC	51742	A.K. Saseendran	M	ICS(SCS)	36937	14805	INC
11	Edakkad	GEN	O. Bharathan	M	CPM	54965	K. Ssudhakaran	M	INC	54746	219	CPI(M)
12	Tellicherry	GEN	K.P. Mamoo Master	M	CPM	48936	A.D. Mustaffa	M	INC	41550	7386	CPI(M)
13	Peringalam	GEN	K.M. Sooppy	M	MUL	49183	P.R. Karup	M	JD	47534	1649	IUML
14	Kuthuparamba	GEN	Pinaray Vijayan	M	CPM	58842	P. Ramakrishnan	M	INC	45782	13060	CPI(M)
15	Peravoor	GEN	K.P. Noorudheen	M	INC	60212	Ramachandran Kadannapally	M	ICS(SCS)	51834	8378	INC
16	North Wynad	(ST)	K. Raghavan Master	M	INC	50685	K.C. Kuniharaman	M	CPM	43150	7475	INC
17	Badagara	GEN	K. Chandrasekharan	M	JD	59820	K.C. Abu	M	INC	47336	12484	JD
18	Nadapuram	GEN	Satyyan Mokeri	M	CPI	60053	P. Shaduli	M	MUL	52427	7626	CPI
19	Meppayur	GEN	A. Kanaran	M	CPM	58362	Kadameri Balakrishnan	M	INC	49038	9324	CPI(M)
20	Quilandy	GEN	M.T. Padma	F	INC	56642	C. Kunhamed	M	CPI	54139	2503	INC
21	Perambra	GEN	N.K. Radha	F	CPM	58978	K.A. Devassia	M	KEC	54562	4416	CPI(M)
22	Balusseri	GEN	A.C. Shanmukhadas	M	ICS(SCS)	52470	P. Shankaran	M	INC	42758	9712	ICS
23	Koduvally	GEN	P.V. Mohammed	M	MUL	51793	C. Mohasin	M	JD	51395	398	IUML
24	Calicut- I	GEN	A. Sujanapal	M	INC	53079	M. Dasan	M	CPM	49319	3760	INC
25	Calicut- II	GEN	M.K. Muneer	M	MUL	52779	C.P. Kunhu	M	CPM	48896	3883	IUML
26	Beypore	GEN	T.K. Hamza	M	CPM	66683	K. Madhavan Kutty	M	IND	60413	6270	CPI(M)
27	Kunnamangalam	(SC)	C.P. Balan Vudiar	M	CPM	47946	A. Balaram	M	INC	46788	1158	CPI(M)
28	Thiruvambady	GEN	A.V. Abdurahimanhat	M	MUL	50767	P. Cyriac John	M	ICS(SCS)	44665	6102	IUML
29	Kalpetta	GEN	K.K. Ramachandran Master	M	INC	46488	K.K. Hemza	M	JD	42696	3792	INC
30	Sultan'S Battery	GEN	K.C. Rosakutty	F	INC	53050	Varghese Vaidyar	M	CPM	50544	2506	INC
31	Wandoor	(SC)	Pandalam Sudhakaran	M	INC	53104	Kunnath Velayudhan	M	CPM	45509	7595	INC
32	Nilambur	GEN	Aryadan Muhammed	M	INC	60558	K. Abdurahiman Master	M	IND	52874	7684	INC
33	Manjeri	GEN	Ishaque Kurikkal	M	MUL	57717	K.P. Mohammed	M	JD	35286	22431	IUML
34	Malappuram	GEN	Yoonus Kunju	M	MUL	49713	Sebastian J. Kaloor	M	ICS(SCS)	22604	27109	IUML
35	Kondotty	GEN	K. Abu	M	MUL	54042	Madathil Mohammedaji	M	JD	33178	20864	IUML
36	Tirurangadi	GEN	V.A. Beeran Sahib	M	MUL	47223	M. Rahmathulla	M	CPI	28021	19202	IUML
37	Tanur	GEN	P. Seethi Haji	M	MUL	47424	M. Mohamed Master	M	CPM	21577	25847	IUML
38	Tirur	GEN	E.T. Mohamed Basheer		MUL	52489	Kuruiyan Syed	M	ICS(SCS)	39984	12505	IUML
39	Ponnani	GEN	E.K. Imbichibava	M	CPM	49264	P.T. Mohankrishnan	M	INC	44180	5084	CPI(M)
40	Kuttippuram	GEN	P.K. Kunhalikutty	M	MUL	44865	V.P. Sakkariya	M	CPM	22539	22326	IUML
41	Mankada	GEN	K.P.A. Majeed	M	MUL	48605	K. Ummer Master	M	CPM	42645	5960	IUML
42	Perinthalmanna	GEN	Sooppy Nalakath	M	MUL	49766	M.M. Mustafa	M	IND	42827	6939	IUML
43	Thrithala	(SC)	E. Sankaran	M	CPM	46187	K.P. Raman Master	M	MUL	40602	5585	CPI(M)
44	Pattambi	GEN	K.E. Esmail	M	CPI	43351	Leela Damodara Memon	F	INC	39681	3670	CPI
45	Ottapalam	GEN	V.C. Kabeer Master	M	ICS(SCS)	42771	K. Sankaranarayanan	M	INC	38501	4270	ICS
46	Sreekrishnapuram	GEN	P. Balan	M	INC	51864	E.M. Sreedharan	M	CPM	50166	1698	INC
47	Mannarkkad	GEN	Kalladi Mohammed	M	MUL	53884	P. Kumaran	M	CPI	49414	4470	IUML
48	Malampuzha	GEN	T. Sivadasa Menon	M	CPM	50361	V. Krishnadas	M	CPM(K)	32370	17991	CPI(M)
49	Palghat	GEN	C.M. Sundaram	M	INC	41432	M.S. Gopalakirshnan	M	CPM	37925	3507	INC
50	Chittur	GEN	K. Krishnankutty	M	JD	47281	K.A. Chandran	M	INC	44170	3111	JD
51	Kollengode	GEN	T. Chathu	M	CPM	47058	A, Ramaswamy	M	INC	45853	1205	CPI(M)
52	Coyalmannam	(SC)	M. Naryannan	M	CPM	50315	M. Ayyappan Master	M	INC	42597	7718	CPI(M)
53	Alathur	GEN	A.V. Gopinathan	M	INC	49512	V. Sukumaran Master	M	CPM	49174	338	INC
54	Chelakara	(SC)	M.P. Thami	M	INC	47790	C. Kuttappan	M	CPM	43429	4361	INC
55	Wadakkanchery	GEN	K.S. Narayanan Namboodiri	M	INC	51414	K. Mohandas	M	KEC	43773	7641	INC
56	Kunnamkulam	GEN	T.V. Chandramohan	M	INC	53099	K.P. Aravindhakshan	M	CPM	50344	2755	INC
57	Cherpu	GEN	V.V. Raghavan	M	CPI	50767	M.K. Abdul Salam	M	INC	46309	4458	CPI
58	Trichur	GEN	Therambil Ramakrishnan	M	INC	53190	E.K. Menon	M	CPM	45899	7291	INC
59	Ollur	GEN	P.P. George	M	INC	57910	A.M. Paraman	M	CPI	52669	5241	INC
60	Kodakara	GEN	K. P. Viswanathan	M	INC	49971	P.R. Rajan	M	CPM	48360	1611	INC
61	Chalakudi	GEN	Rosamma Chacko	F	INC	49482	Jose Painadath	M	JD	42742	6740	INC
62	Mala	GEN	K. Karunakaran	M	INC	50966	V.K. Rajan	M	CPI	48492	2474	INC
63	Irinjalakuda	GEN	Lonappan Nambadan	M	IND	53351	A.L. Sebastian	M	KCM	43927	9424	IND
64	Manalur	GEN	V.M. Sudheeran	M	INC	45930	K.F. Davis	M	CPM	40414	5516	INC
65	Guruvayoor	GEN	P.M. Abubacker	M	MUL	40496	K.K. Kammu	M	IND	34820	5676	IUML
66	Nattika	GEN	Krishnan Kaniyamparabil	M	CPI	44762	Raghvan Pozhakadavil	M	INC	43596	1166	CPI
67	Kodungallur	GEN	Meenakshy Thampan	F	CPI	53542	T.A. Ahammed Kabeer	M	MUL	42353	11189	CPI
68	Ankamali	GEN	P.J. Joy	M	INC	60441	M.V. Mani	M	KEC	52843	7598	INC
69	Vadakkekara	GEN	S. Sarma	M	CPM	52897	M.I. Shanavas	M	INC	52100	797	CPI(M)
70	Parur	GEN	P.Raju	M	CPI	43551	Karthav	M	IND	40719	2832	CPI
71	Narakkal	(SC)	K. Kunjambu	M	INC	49102	V.K. Babu	M	ICS(SCS)	45555	3547	INC
Bye Polls	Narakkal	(SC)	V.K.Babu	M	INC		Unconsted					INC
72	Ernakulam	GEN	George Eden	M	INC	54263	Everest Chammany	M	IND	43441	10822	INC
73	Mattancherry	GEN	M.J. Zakaria	M	MUL	33736	Jerson Kalappurakkal	M	IND	24796	8940	IUML
74	Palluruthy	GEN	Dominic Presentation	M	INC	60001	T.P. Peethabaran Master	M	ICS(SCS)	52527	7474	INC
75	Thrippunithura	GEN	K. Babu	M	INC	63887	M.M. Lawrance	M	CPM	58941	4946	INC
76	Alwaye	GEN	K. Mohamed Ali	M	INC	64837	T.O. Khathir Pillai	M	CPM	56266	8571	INC
77	Perumbavoor	GEN	P.P. Thankachan	M	INC	52494	Alumkal Devassy	M	JD	49183	3311	INC
78	Kunnathunad	GEN	T.H. Musthafa	M	INC	56094	Rukhiya Beevi Ali	F	IND	48626	7468	INC
79	Piravom	GEN	T.M. Jacob	M	KCM	53751	Gopi Kottamurickal	M	CPM	50804	2947	KCM
80	Muvattupuzha	GEN	Johny Nelloor	M	KCM	51783	A.V. Issac	M	IND	48004	3779	KCM
81	Kothamangalam	GEN	V.J. Faulose	M	INC	51862	T.M. Paily	M	IND	44490	7372	INC
82	Thodupuzha	GEN	P.T. Thomas	M	INC	55666	P.J. Joseph	M	KEC	54574	1092	INC
83	Devicolam	(SC)	K. Moni Alias A.K. Moni	M	INC	51801	S. Sundramanickam	M	CPM	44859	6942	INC
84	Idukki	GEN	Mathew Stephen	M	KCM	52559	Johny Poomattom	M	KEC	48881	3678	KCM
85	Udumbanchola	GEN	E.M. Augusthy	M	INC	59843	M. Jinadevan	M	CPM	56469	3354	INC
86	Peermade	GEN	K.K. Thomas	M	INC	46868	C.A. Kurian	M	CPI	41827	5041	INC
87	Kanjirappally	GEN	George J. Mathew	M	INC	45973	K.J. Thomas	M	CPM	44815	1158	INC
88	Vazhoor	GEN	K. Narayana Karup	M	KCM	43354	Kanam Rajendran	M	CPI	40804	2550	KCM
89	Changanacherry	GEN	C.F. Thomas	M	KCM	53742	M.T. Joseph	M	CPM	41965	11777	KCM
90	Kottayam	GEN	T.K. Ramakrishnan	M	CPM	54182	Cherian Philip	M	INC	51500	2682	CPI(M)
91	Ettumanoor	GEN	Thomas Chazihikadan	M	KCM	49233	Vaikom Viswan	M	CPM	48347	886	KCM
92	Puthuppally	GEN	Oommen Chandy	M	INC	56150	Vasavan	M	CPM	42339	13811	INC
93	Poonjar	GEN	Joy Abraham	M	KCM	43936	N.M. Joseph	M	JD	33518	10418	KCM
94	Palai	GEN	K.M. Mani	M	KCM	52310	George C. Kappan	M	IND	35021	17289	KCM
95	Kaduthuruthy	GEN	P.M. Mathew	M	KCM	50324	E.J. Lukose	M	KEC	36592	13732	KCM
96	Vaikom	(SC)	K.K. Balakrishnan	M	INC	50692	K.P. Sreedharan	M	CPI	49654	1038	INC
97	Aroor	GEN	K.R. Gouri Amma	F	CPM	56230	P.J. Francis	M	INC	52613	3617	CPI(M)
98	Sherthalai	GEN	C.K. Chandrappan	M	CPI	50844	Vayalar Ravi	M	INC	49853	991	CPI
99	Mararikulam	GEN	V.S. Achuthanandan	M	CPM	71470	D. Sugathan	M	INC	61490	9980	CPI(M)
100	Alleppey	GEN	K.P. Ramachandran Nair	M	NDP	42269	P.S. Somasekhara	M	CPI	41519	750	NDP
101	Ambalapuzha	GEN	C.K. Sadasivan	M	CPM	48150	V. Dinakaran	M	INC	46617	1533	CPI(M)
102	Kuttanad	GEN	K.C. Joseph	M	KEC	45669	P.D. Luke	M	KCM	36673	8996	KEC
103	Haripad	GEN	K.K. Sreenivasan	M	INC	52891	A.V. Thamarakshan	M	RSP	52376	515	INC
104	Kayamkulam	GEN	Thachady Prabhakaran	M	INC	46682	M.R. Gopalakrishnan	M	CPM	46649	33	INC
105	Thiruvalla	GEN	Mammen Mathai	M	KCM	35843	Mathew T. Thomas	M	JD	33950	1893	KCM
106	Kallooppara	GEN	Joseph M. Puthussery	M	IND	35524	T.S. John	M	KEC	30288	5236	IND
107	Aranmula	GEN	R. Ramachandran Nair	M	NDP	37534	C.A. Mathew	M	ICS(SCS)	32128	5406	NDP
108	Chengannur	GEN	Sobhana George	F	INC	40208	Mammen Iype	M	ICS(SCS)	36761	3447	INC
109	Mavelikara	GEN	M. Murali	M	INC	50292	S. Govinda Kurup	M	CPM	44322	5970	INC
110	Pandalam	(SC)	V. Kisavan	M	CPM	52768	M.A. Kuttappan	M	INC	51210	1558	CPI(M)
111	Ranni	GEN	M.C. Cheriyan Moozhickal	M	INC	41048	Idiculla Mappila	M	CPM	38809	2239	INC
112	Pathanamthitta	GEN	K.K. Nair	M	IND	47367	Eapen Varughese	M	KEC	29899	17468	IND
113	Konni	GEN	A. Padma Kumar	M	CPM	42531	C.P. Ramachandran Nair	M	IND	41615	916	CPI(M)
114	Pathanapuram	GEN	K. Prakash Babu	M	CPI	50295	Vakkanand Radhakrishnan	M	KCM	44267	6028	CPI
115	Punalur	GEN	Punalur Madhu	M	INC	53050	Mullakkara Ratnakaran	M	CPI	51738	1312	INC
116	Chadayamangalam	GEN	E. Rajendran	M	CPI	46025	A. Hidur Mohammed	M	INC	40986	5039	CPI
117	Kottarakkara	GEN	R. Balakrishna Pillai	M	IND	47122	George Mathew	M	CPM	41707	5421	IND
118	Neduvathur	(SC)	B. Raghavan	M	CPM	49296	N. Narayanan	M	INC	42112	7184	CPI(M)
119	Adoor	GEN	Thiruvanchoor Radhakrishnan	M	INC	44147	R. Unnikrishna Pillai	M	CPM	38380	5767	INC
120	Kunnathur	(SC)	T. Nanoomaster	M	RSP	56064	V. Sasidharan	M	INC	53462	2602	RSP
121	Karunagappally	GEN	P.S Sreenivasan	M	CPI	53576	Jameela Ibrahim	F	INC	47326	6250	CPI
122	Chavara	GEN	Baby John	M	RSP	51249	Prathapa Varma Thampan	M	INC	46925	4324	RSP
123	Kundara	GEN	Alphonsa John	F	INC	46447	J. Mercykutty Amma	F	CPM	45075	1372	INC
124	Quilon	GEN	Kadavoor Sivadasan	M	INC	48307	Babu Divakaran	M	RSP	43831	4476	INC
125	Eravipuram	GEN	P.K.K. Bava	M	MUL	55972	V.P. Ramakrishna Pillai	M	IND	55350	422	IUML
126	Chathanoor	GEN	C.V. Padmarajan	M	INC	53755	P. Ravindran	M	CPI	49244	4511	INC
127	Varkala	GEN	Varkala Radhakrishnan	M	CPM	42977	Varkala Kahar	M	INC	39680	3297	CPI(M)
128	Attingal	GEN	T. Saratchandra Prasad	M	INC	41964	Anathalavattom Anadan	M	CPM	41527	437	INC
129	Kilimanoor	(SC)	N. Rajan	M	CPI	51937	Thankappan	M	INC	47882	4055	CPI
130	Vamanapuram	GEN	Kolaikode N. Krishna Nair	M	CPM	52248	R.M. Parameswaran	M	INC	50882	1366	CPI(M)
131	Ariyanad	GEN	G. Karihikeyan	M	INC	44302	K. Pankajakshan	M	RSP	40822	3480	INC
132	Nedumangad	GEN	Palode Ravi	M	INC	54678	K. Govinda Pillai	M	CPI	53739	939	INC
133	Kazhakuttam	GEN	M.V. Raghavan	M	CPM(K)	51243	A. Nabeesaummal	F	CPM	50554	689	CPM(K)
134	Trivandrum North	GEN	M. Vijaya Kumar	M	CPM	52865	T. Raveendtan Thampi	M	NDP	52525	340	CPI(M)
135	Trivandrum West	GEN	M.M. Hassan	M	INC	43620	Antony Raju	M	KEC	35121	8499	INC
136	Trivandrum East	GEN	B. Vijaya Kumar	M	INC	41230	K. Sankaranaraya Pillai	M	ICS(SCS)	33302	8018	INC
137	Nemom	GEN	V.J. Thankappan	M	CPM	47063	Stanly Sathyanesan	M	CPM(K)	40201	6862	CPI(M)
138	Kovalam	GEN	A. Neela Lohitha Dajan Kadar	M	JD	49515	George Maserine	M	INC	49494	21	JD
139	Neyyattinkara	GEN	Thampanoor Ravi	M	INC	49016	S.R. Thanka Raj	M	JD	47042	1974	INC
140	Parassala	GEN	M.R. Raghu Chandra Bal	M	INC	48423	Sathyanesan	M	CPM	40788	7635	INC
