= P. Raghavan =

Indian Communist politician (1945–2022)

Member of Kerala Legislative Assembly
- In office 1991–2001
- Constituency: Udma

Personal details
- Born: 15 October 1945 Munnad, South Canara, Madras presidency, British India
- Died: 5 July 2022 (aged 76) Munnad, Bedaduka, Kasaragod district, Kerala, India
- Party: Communist Party of India (Marxist)
- Spouse: Kamala
- Children: 2
- Parent(s): Cheviri Raman Nair; Perail Maniamma

P. Raghavan was a Communist Party of India (Marxist) politician from Kerala, India. From 1991 to 2001 he represented Uduma constituency in Kerala Legislative Assembly.

== Biography ==
P. Raghavan was born on 15 October 1945, the youngest of seven children of Cheviri Raman Nair and Perail Maniamma in Munnad, Bedaduka in present-day Kasargod district. He was educated at Munnad AUP School, Iriyanni High School, Kasaragod Government College and Udupi Law College. He was graduated in Economics and Law. While a student at Munnad AUP School, he became active in student politics through KSF. He was later elected as KSF unit secretary. While studying at Udupi Law College, he was the Secretary of the Student Federation Unit and at that time, he also served as KSF Kannur District Committee President and State Committee Member.

When he left the studies, he became active in KSYF and later elected KSYF's Kasaragod Taluk Secretary. He was a volunteer in the Parliament March organized by KSYF with the slogan 'Job or Unemployment Wages' and was arrested for it and served a month's imprisonment in Tihar Jail. He was arrested in December 1969 in the Thalappallam case, and was imprisoned in Kasaragod sub-jail for two weeks. It was on the complaint of a resident of the area that the volunteer camp organized by the party Bandatukka and Thalappallat was misled by the police as a Naxalite camp. After years of trial, the court dismissed the case.

In 1974, he started his professional career as a lawyer at the Kasaragod Bar.

=== Personal life and death ===
He and his wife Kamala have two sons Ajith Kumar and Arun Raghavan. He died on 5 July 2022.

== Political career ==
Raghavan was active in politics since his school time. He started getting noticed in politics when he led the Mehboob bus workers' strike while he was a student at Kasaragod College. He became a member of Communist Party of India (Marxist) in 1964. In 1984, when Kasaragod district came into existence, he was elected as a district committee member of CPI (M). Then he was elected to the district secretariat of the CPI (M), and remained in the position for 37 years.

As a trade union activist, he was at the forefront of organizing workers in the unorganised sector in the Kasaragod region. He was the District Secretary of CITU Kasaragod from 1989 to 2012. He was also elected as Member of CITU National Executive Committee and State Secretary of CITU. During his college days, Raghavan took up the incident of the killing of a bus conductor Varadaraja Pai. The CITU Kasaragod district committee office, which was built when he was the general secretary of CITU, was made a Varadaraja Pai memorial.

Later, under the leadership of P. Raghavan, the District Motor Workers' Cooperative Society was established and buses were launched under the name 'Varadaraja Pai'. Raghavan, who organized the motor workers and strengthened the union, became the district president of the union, the state president of the bus workers' federation and a member of the national working committee of the federation.

Under the leadership of Raghavan, more than twenty five cooperative ventures have been started in Kasaragod district. Raghavan saw the cooperative sector as the main way to grow CPI (M) and CITU in the district. Co-operative societies like Kasaragod NGK Printing Society, Motor Workers Cooperative Society, Kasaragod People's Welfare Cooperative Society, Bedakum Clay Workers Cooperative Society, Kasaragod Ayurveda Cooperative Society, Fruit and Vegetable Cooperative Society, Kasaragod Dinesh Beedi Cooperative Society were founded by Raghavan. At the time of death, he was the president of Kasaragod Education Cooperative society and Kasaragod People's Welfare Cooperative society.

== Electoral politics ==
From 1991 to 2001, P. Raghavan represented Udma Assembly constituency in 9th and 10th Kerala legislative assemblies as a CPI (M) candidate. He also served as the President of Bedaduka Panchayat for eight years.

== Awards and honours ==
- Second E Narayanan Memorial Award instituted by Thalassery Cooperative Rural Bank.
