= Pallikkara, Payyoli =

Pallikkara
- urban village
- Location in Kerala, India Pallikkara (India)
- Coordinates: 11°30′0″N 75°38′0″E
- Country: India
- State: Kerala
- District: Kozhikode

Population (2001)
  - Total: 20,846

Languages
  - Official: Malayalam, English
- Time zone: UTC+5:30 (IST)
- PIN: 673522
- Vehicle registration: KL-56
- Nearest city: payyoli
- Literacy: 100%
- Lok Sabha constituency: Vatakara
- Vidhan Sabha constituency: Koyilandy

Pallikkara is a village 3 km from Payyoli, in the Kozhikode district of Kerala, India. It is between Vatakara and Koyilandy.

== Demographics ==
As of 2001 India census, Pallikkara had a population of 20846 with 9985 males and 10861 females.

== Transportation ==
Pallikkara village connects to other parts of India through Koyilandy town. The nearest airports are at Kannur and Kozhikode. The nearest railway station is at payyoli . The national highway no.66 passes through Koyilandy and the northern stretch connects to Mangalore, Goa and Mumbai. The southern stretch connects to Cochin and Trivandrum. The eastern National Highway No.54 going through Kuttiady connects to Mananthavady, Mysore and Bangalore.
