= Bandadka =

Bandadka Kottakkal
- Village
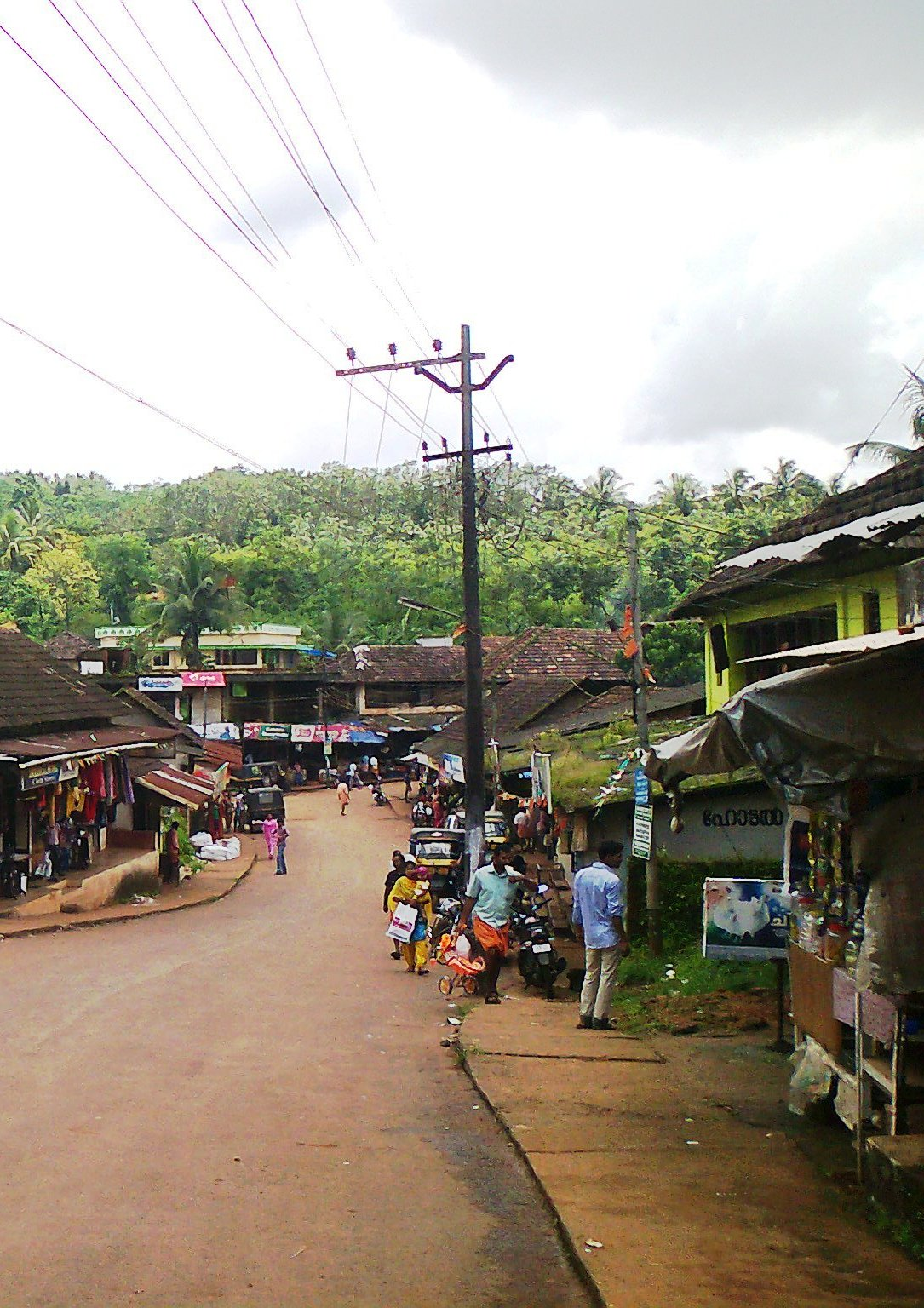
- Bandadka Street Dwight and Clara Watson HouseDwight and Clara Watson House

- Location in Kerala, India Bandadka (India)
- Coordinates: 12°30′0″N 75°16′0″E
- Country: India
- State: Kerala
- District: Kasaragod

Government
  - Body: Kuttikole Grama Panchayat

Area
  - Total: 23.3 km^{2} (9.0 sq mi)

Population (2011)
  - Total: 7,824
  - Density: 336/km^{2} (870/sq mi)

Languages
  - Official: Malayalam, English, Kannada, Tulu
- Time zone: UTC+5:30 (IST)
- PIN: 671541
- Vehicle registration: KL-14

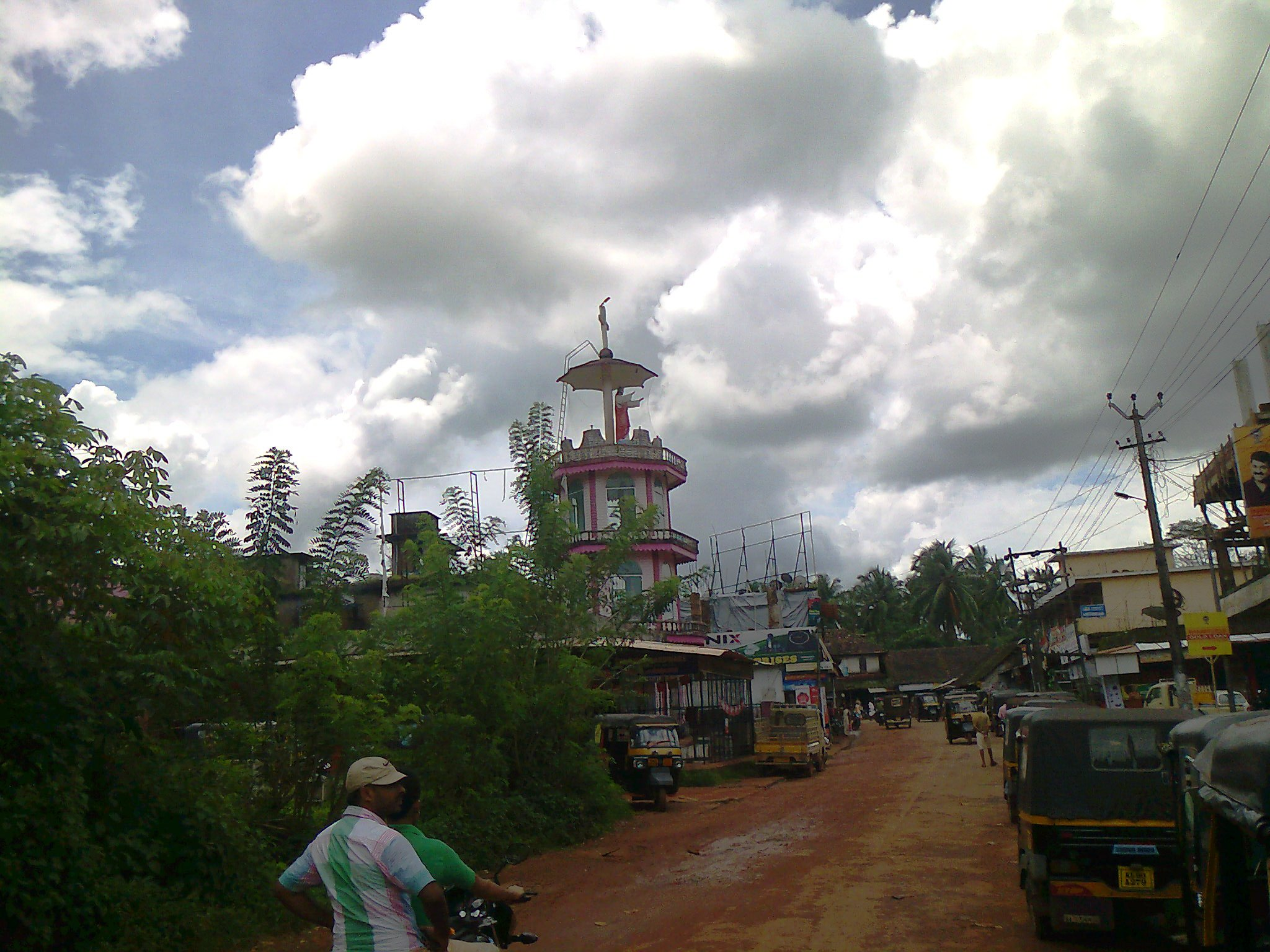
Bandadka Town

Bandadka is a small town in Kasaragod district in the state of Kerala, India. It is also called Kottakal because of Bandadka Fort. It falls under the Kuttikole Grama Panchayat. It is located 38 km (24 mi) east of the district headquarters Kasaragod, 568 km (353 mi) away from the State capital Thiruvananthapuram, 5 km (3.1 mi) west of the Karnataka border and 20 km (12 mi) away from Sullia. Bandadka's pin code is 671541 and its postal head office is Chengala.

== Demographics ==
As of 2011 Census, Bandadka had a population of 7,824 with 3,893 males and 3,931 females. Bandadka village has an area of 23.3 km^{2} (9.0 sq mi) with 1,849 families residing in it. The average female sex ratio was 1010 lower than the state average of 1084. 10.1% of the population in the village was under 6 years of age. Bandadka had an average literacy of 87.36% lower than the state average of 94%; male literacy was 91% and female literacy was 83.66%. Bandadka includes hamlets such as Kakkachal.

== Transportation ==
Bandadka is Situated between Poinachi - Aletty- Sullia road. Mysore and Bangalore can easily get by these road. Private and ksrtc Buses provide routes to Kasaragod, Kanhangad, Panathur, Mangalore and Kannur. The Nearest Railway station is Kasaragod and Kanhangad on Mangalore-Palakkad line. There are Airports at Mangalore International Airport in North and Kannur International Airport in South.
