= Kuttikole =

- Town
- Location in Kerala, India Kuttikole (India)
- Coordinates: 12°29′0″N 75°12′0″E
- Country: India
- State: Kerala
- District: Kasaragod

Government
  - Type: Panchayati Raj (India)
  - Body: Kuttikole Grama Panchayat

Area
  - Total: 20.94 km^{2} (8.08 sq mi)

Population (2011)
  - Total: 7,057
  - Density: 337.0/km^{2} (872.9/sq mi)

Languages
  - Official: Malayalam, English
- Time zone: UTC+5:30 (IST)
- PIN: 671541
- Vehicle registration: KL-14
- Nearest city: Kasaragod
- Lok Sabha constituency: Kasaragod
- Climate: hot and humid (Köppen)

Kuttikole is a village and Gram Panchayat in the Kasaragod district in the Indian state of Kerala.

== Demographics ==
As of 2011 Census, Kuttikole village had a population of 7,057 with 3,444 males and 3,613 females. Kuttikole village has an area of 20.94 km^{2} (8.08 sq mi) with 1,657 families residing in it. The average female sex ratio was 1049 lower than the state average of 1084. 10.4% of the population in the village was under 6 years of age. Kuttikole had an average literacy of 87% lower than the state average of 94%; male literacy was 91% and female literacy was 83.1%.

== Education ==
Nine educational institutions are located in Kuttikole: Manadukam GUPS, Karuvadakam AUPS, Kuttikole AUPS, Thavanath GLPS, Bethurpara ALPS, Maryapuram St. Mary's ALPS, Sankarampady ACNMALPS, Bandadka GHSS, and Bethurpara GHSS.

== Economy ==
Kuttikole has an agricultural economy and produces rubber, rice, vegetables, pulses and tubers, coconut, and spices. It has a tropical climate, with hot and humid weather most of the year.

The economy is becoming more dependent on the construction sector and small industries.

== Politics ==
Kuttikole Panchayat is politically a part of Udma Assembly constituency under Kasaragod Loksabha.

== Infrastructure ==
The village has facilities such as a fire station, liquor shops, hospitals, and telephones.

== Transportation ==
This village is connected to the state of Karnataka through Panathur. A 20 km road from Panathur to Sullia in Karnataka offers access to Bangalore and Mysore. Places in Kerala can be accessed by national highway along the coastline and through the Kerala state highway. The nearest airport is Mangalore International Airport, which is 48.02 km from Kuttikole. Kannur international Airport and Calicut are also accessible.

The nearest railway station is Bekal Fort, 16.02 km from Kuttikole.
