= Pallikkara, Bekal =

Village in Kerala, India

Pallikkara
- census town
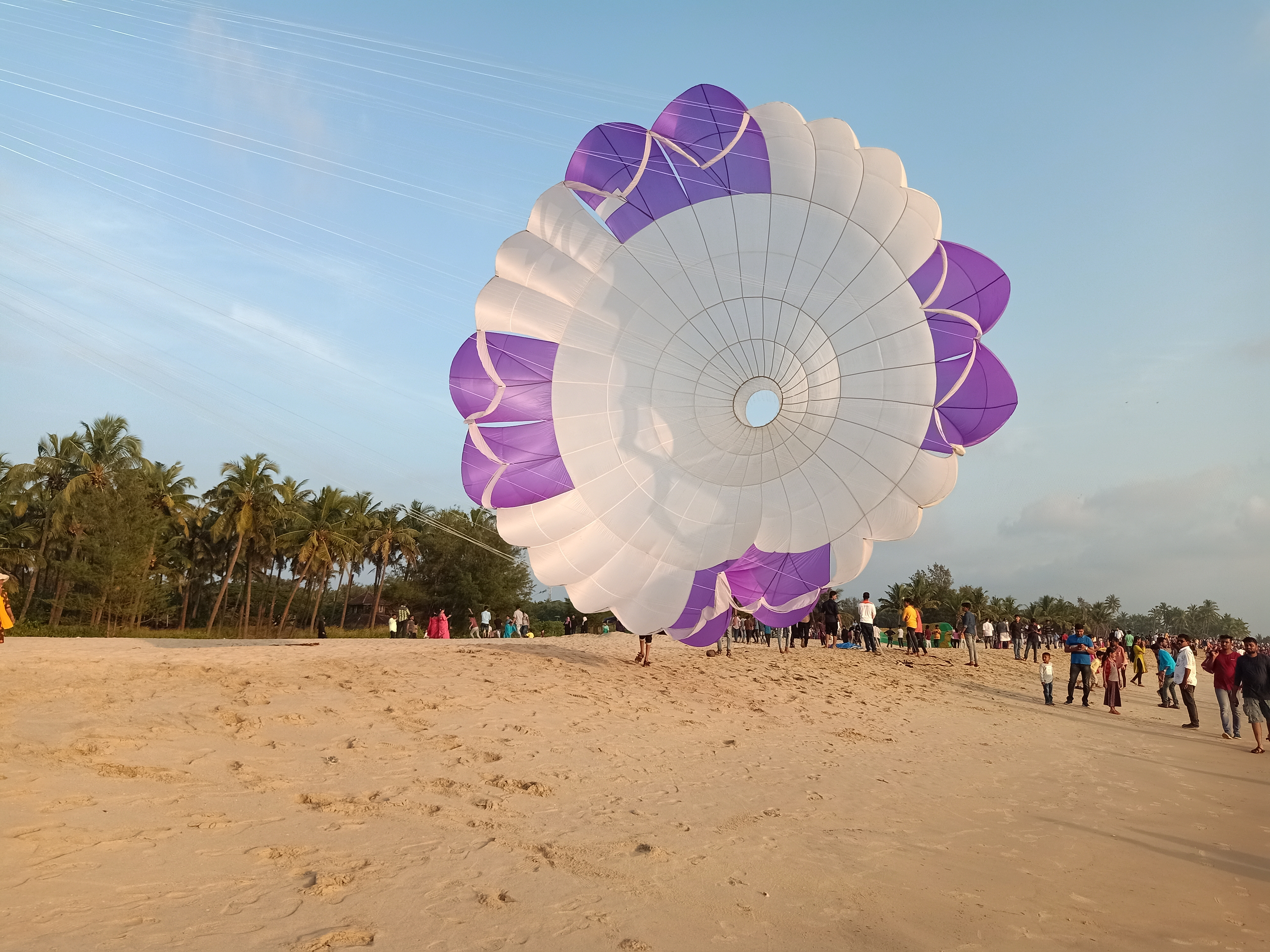
- Kite fest at Pallikkara beach

- Location in Kerala, India Pallikkara (India)
- Coordinates: 12.3958°N 75.0816°E
- Country: India
- State: Kerala
- District: Kasaragod
- Taluk: Hosdurg

Government
  - Type: Panchayati raj (India)
  - Body: Pallikkara Grama Panchayat

Area
  - Total: 6.34 km^{2} (2.45 sq mi)

Population (2011)
  - Total: 14,334
  - Density: 2,260/km^{2} (5,860/sq mi)

Languages
  - Official: Malayalam, English
- Time zone: UTC+5:30 (IST)
- PIN: 671316
- Vehicle registration: KL-60

Pallikkara is a census town and a grama panchayat in Hosdurg Taluk of Kasargod district in the state of Kerala, India. This place was once famous for its Tobacco plants until the late 1980s and the Historical landmark Bekal Fort lies in this Village. A beach park near to the fort also attracts tourists to this place.

== Location ==
It lies 11 km north of Kanhangad town and 16.5 km from Kasaragod.

== Demographics ==
As of 2011 Census, Pallikkara had a population of 14,334 of which 6,611 are males and 7,723 are females. Pallikkara census town spreads over an area of 6.34 km^{2} (2.45 sq mi) with 2,734 families residing in it. The sex ratio of Pallikkara was 1,168 higher than state average of 1,084. Population of children under 6 years was 15%. Pallikkara had overall literacy of 89% lower than state average of 94%. The male literacy stands at 92.7% and female literacy was 86%.

== Economy ==
Pallikkara is one of the developing villages in Pallikkere Grama Panchayath. Agriculture is the occupation of majority of the population. Income through agriculture related works, construction works and foreign money are the main sources of income.

== Transportation ==
Local roads have access to NH.66 which connects to Kasaragod, Mangalore in the north and Kannur, Calicut in the south. The nearest railway station is Bekal Fort Railway Station, Kanhangad Railway Station on Mangalore-Palakkad line. The nearest airports are at Mangalore, Kannur and Calicut.

== Image gallery ==
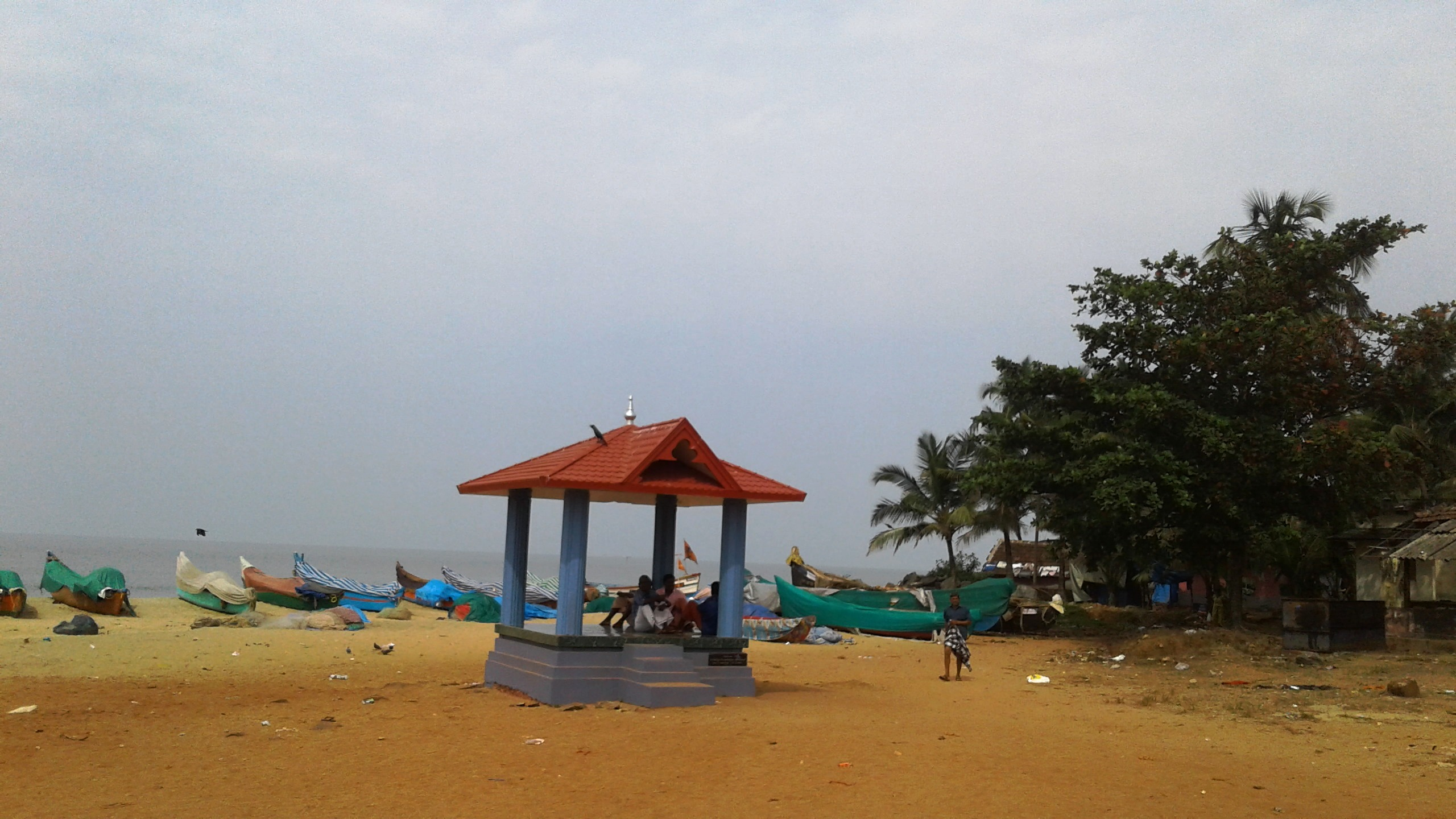
Trikkannad Beach

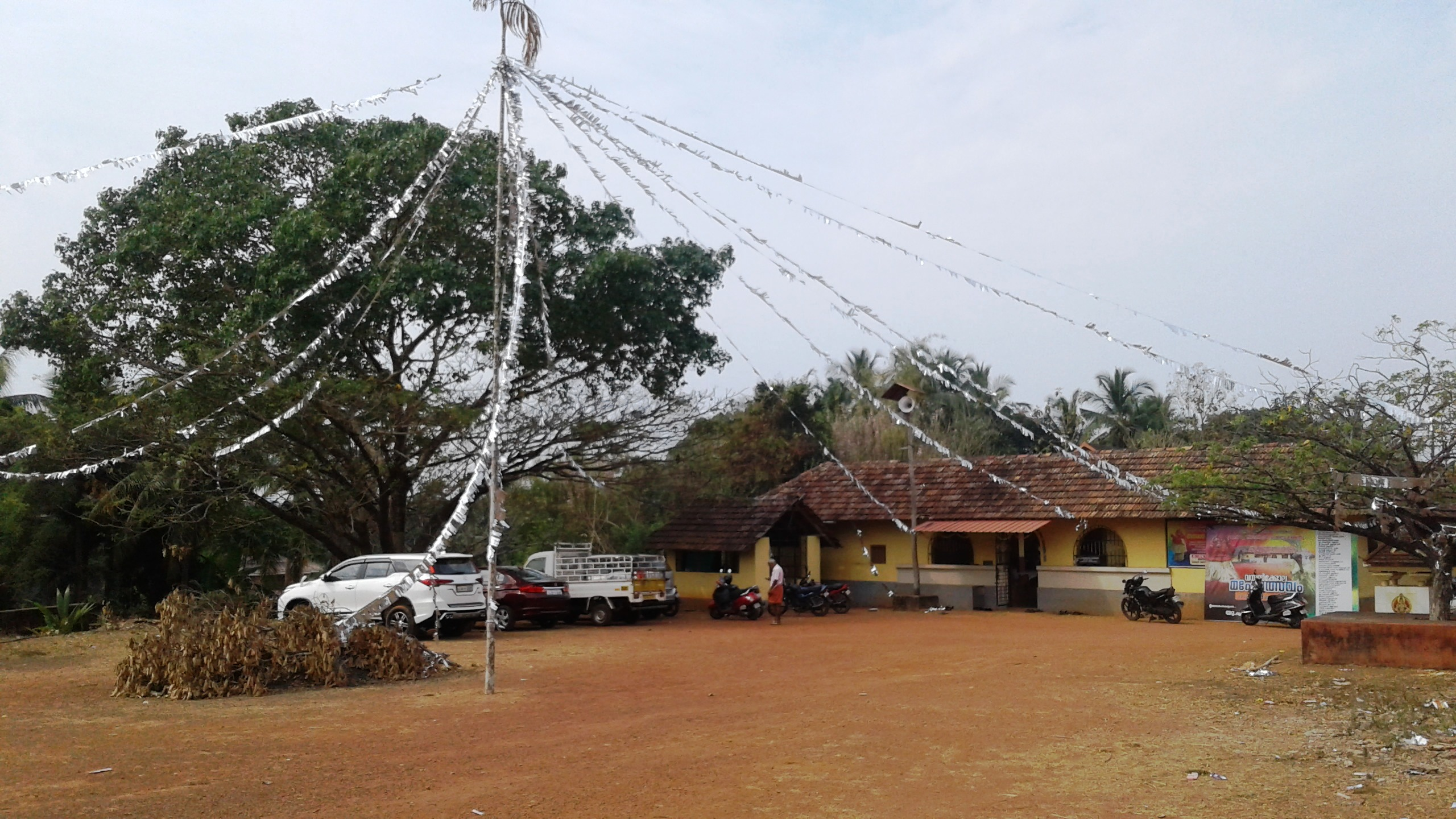
Pakkam

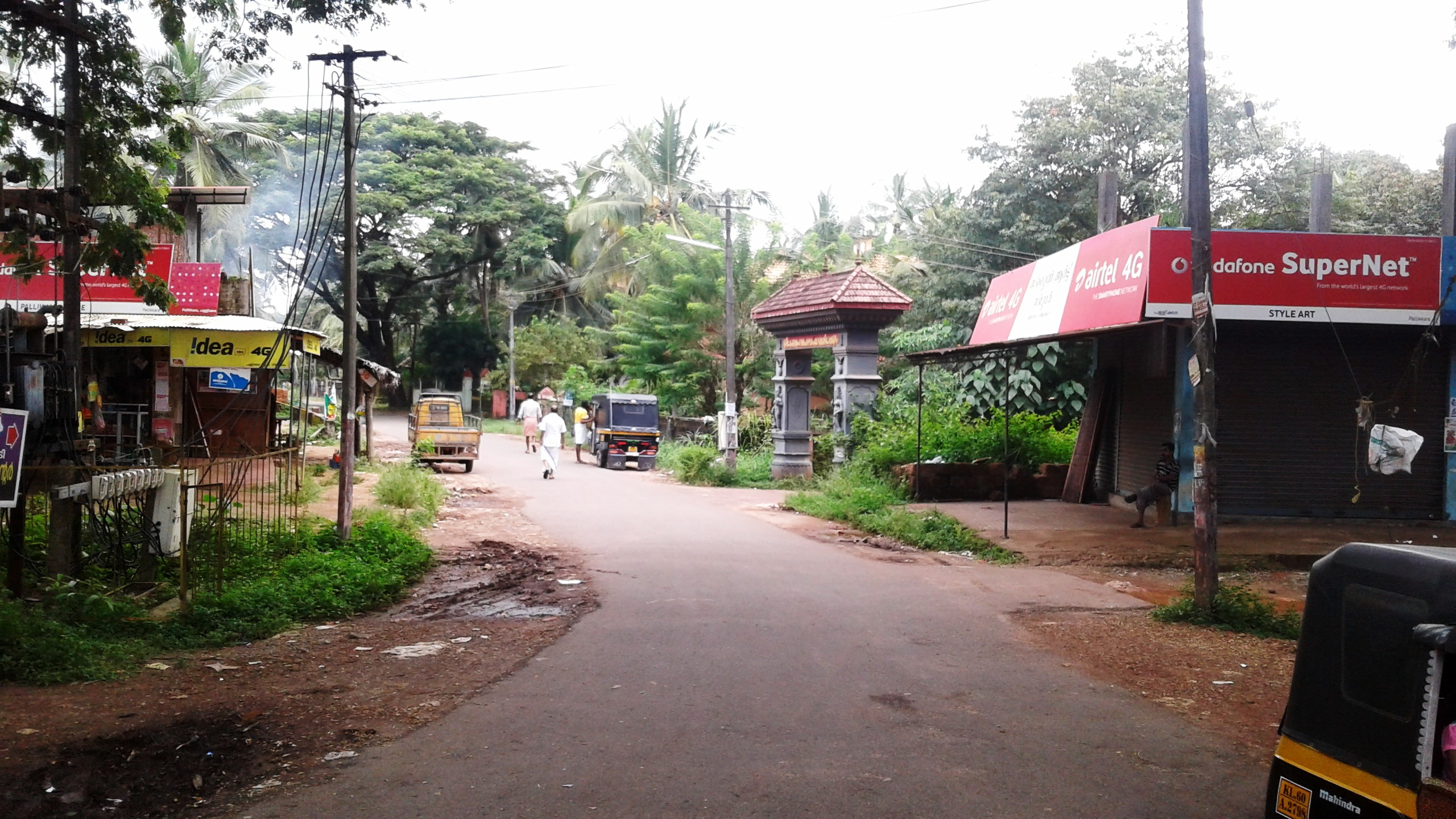
Taluk Road

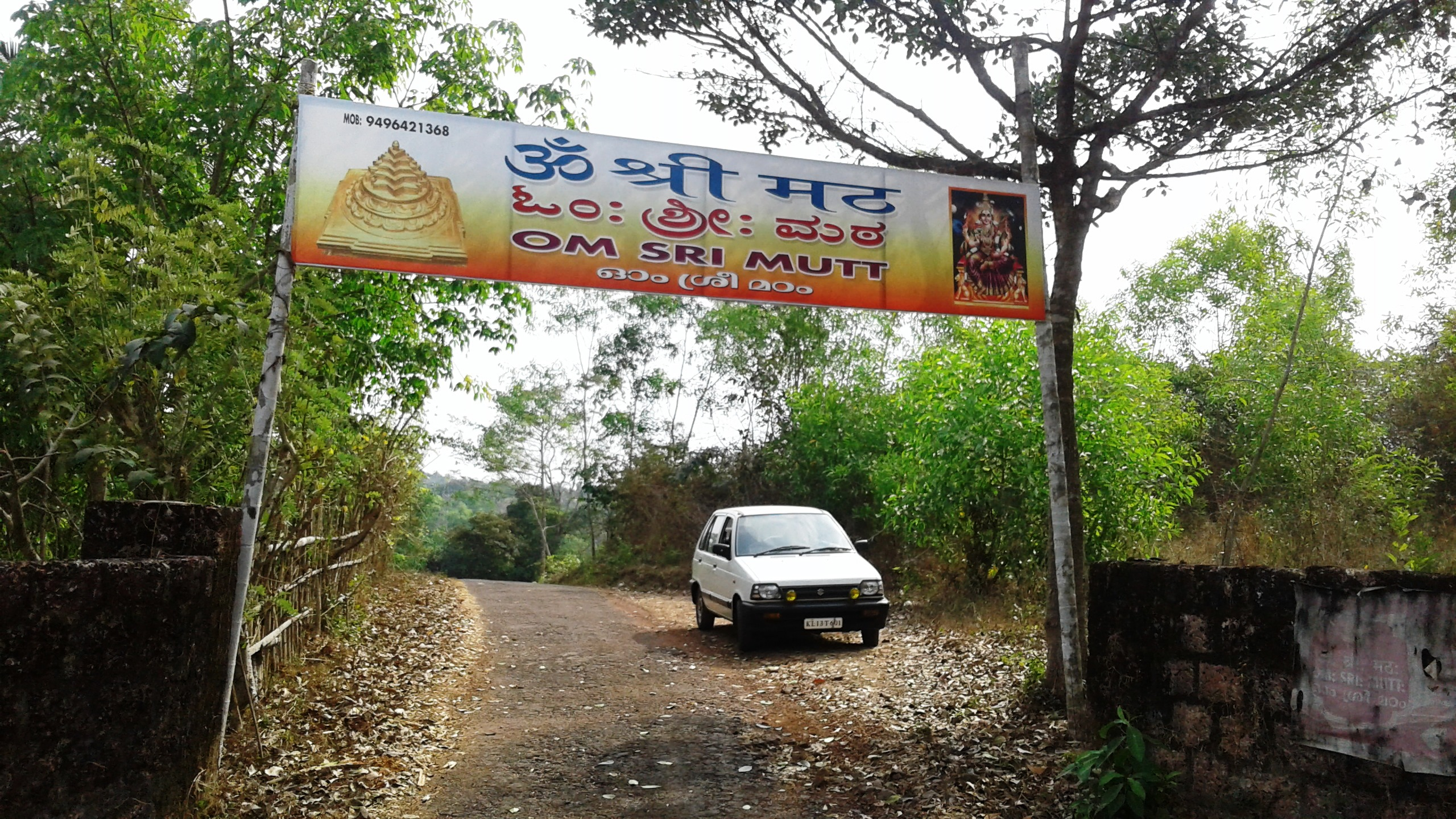
Om Sri Mutt

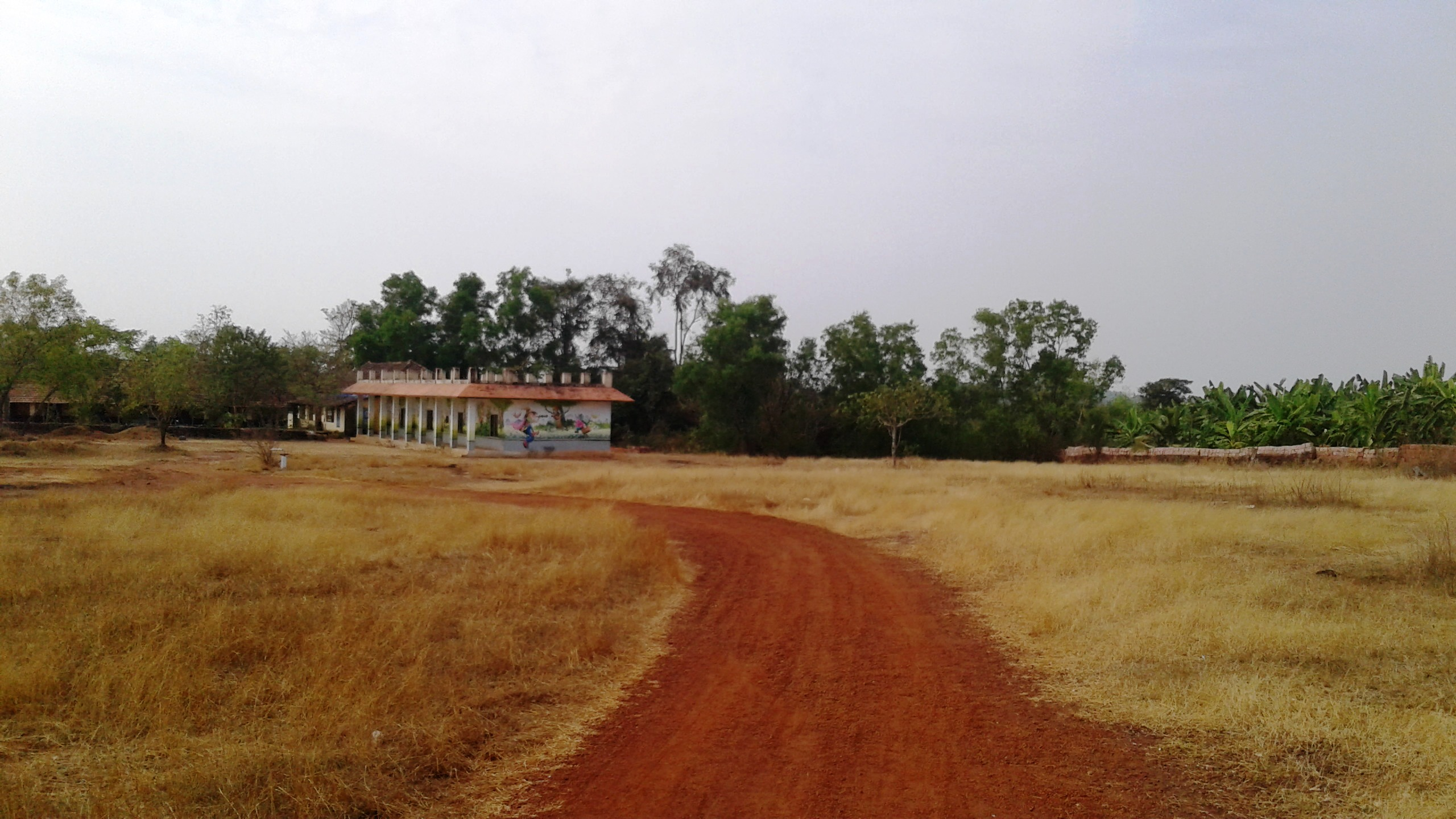
Cherkappara School

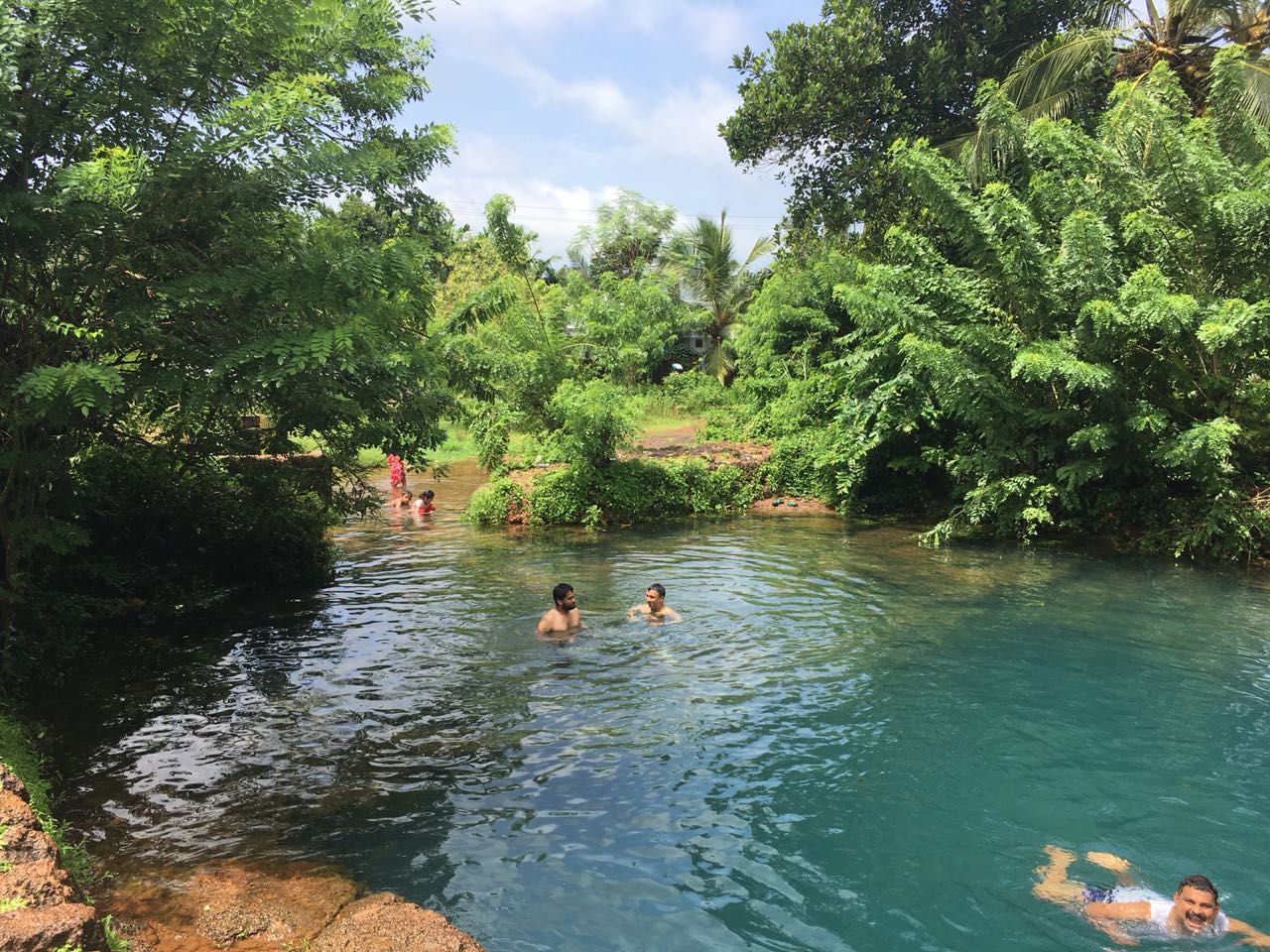
Cherkapara Pond
