= Manjeshwaram taluk =

Manjeshwaram Taluk
- Taluk
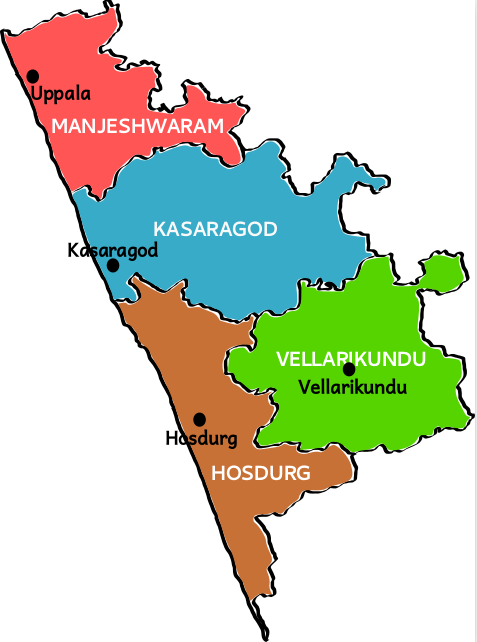
- Manjeshwaram Taluk in Kasaragod dist
- Interactive map of Manjeshwaram Taluk
- Coordinates: 12.683°N 74.9°E
- Country: India
- State: Kerala
- District: Kasaragod
- Headquarters: Uppala

Area
  - Total: 381.54 km^{2} (147.31 sq mi)

Population
  - Total: 268,642
  - Density: 704.10/km^{2} (1,823.6/sq mi)

Languages
  - Official: Malayalam, English, Kannada
  - Regional: Malayalam, Tulu, Kannada
- Time zone: UTC+5:30 (IST)

Manjeshwaram taluk is the northern most taluk of Kerala which borders Karnataka state. It is located in Kasaragod district, Kerala which was carved out from Kasaragod taluk on 2013.

== Constituent villages ==
Manjeshwaram taluk has 48 revenue villages.

- Manjeshwaram Panchayat: Kunjathur, Hosabettu, Udyavar(Manjeshwaram CT), Hosangadi, Badaje
- Meenja Panchayat: Meenja, Kadambar, Koliyoor, Kaliyoor, Talakala, Kuloor, Majibail, Moodambail
- Vorkady Panchayat: Vorkady, Pavoor, Kodalamogaru, Pathur
- Paivalike Panchayat: Paivalike, Chippar, Bayar, Kayyar, Kudalmarkala
- Enmakaje Panchayat: Enmakaje, Sheni, Padre, Kattukukke
- Puthige Panchayat: Edanad, Badoor, Kannur, Puthige, Angadimogaru, Mugu
- Kumbla Panchayat: Kumbla, Ichilampady, Mogral, Bombrana, Arikady, Kidoor, Ujarulvar,
- Mangalpady Panchayat: Uppala, Mannamkuzhi, Ichilangod, Mangalpady, Pathwadi, Bekoor, Heroor, Shiriya and Kubanoor

== See also ==
- Koliyoor
- Manjeshwar Assembly constituency
