= Uppala River =

Indian river

Coordinates: 12°42′28″N 74°53′13″E

Uppala River flows through the states of Karnataka and Kerala. Uppala River is 50 km long, making it the 26th longest river in Kerala. It originates from the Veerakamba hills in Dakshina Kannada district in Karnataka at an elevation of 150 metres above sea level, flows primarily in a westward direction, and empties into the Arabian Sea in the backwaters near the town of Uppala located about 22 km north of Kasaragod town in Kerala. The river has a catchment area of 250 km^{2} of which 174 km^{2} is in Karnataka state.

== Course ==
The Uppala River originates from the Kalanjimale Reserve forests part of the Veerkambha Hills of the Dakshina Kannada district, Karnataka. Initially it flows through some hilly towns in Karnataka namely, Vitla, Pallike and Pudhottu. Then the river enters into Kerala and flows through the towns of Aithakumer, Miyapadavu, Meenja, Bekoor, Mulinja, Majibail, Uppala, Poyya, Manjeshwar, Bangramanjeshwar and empties into the Arabian Sea at Hosabettu village near Uppala.
