= Mangalpady =

- Panchayat
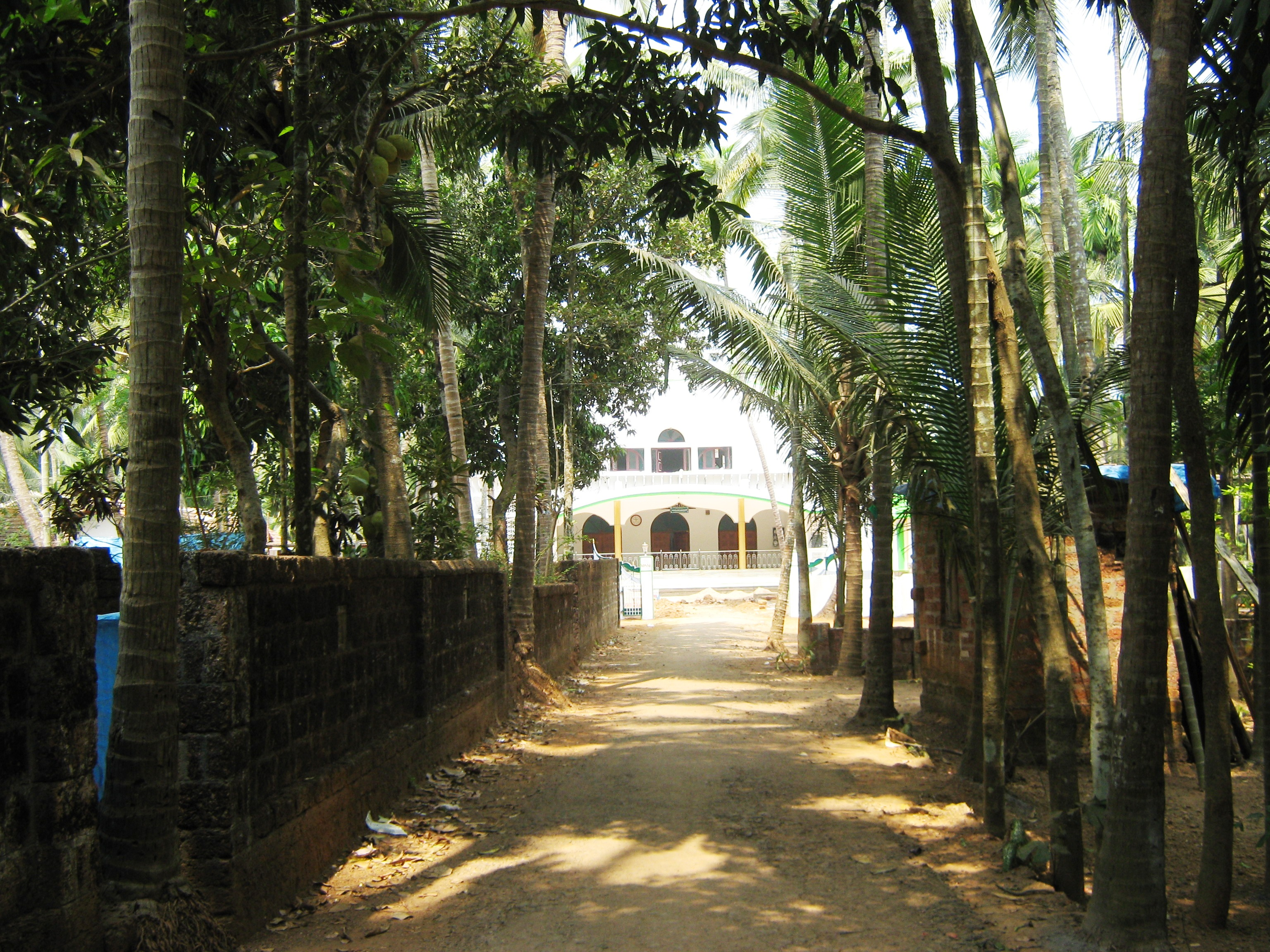
- Olayam Masjidh, Shiriya

- Location in Kerala, India Mangalpady (India)
- Coordinates: 12°38′35″N 74°55′10″E
- Country: India
- State: Kerala
- District: Kasaragod

Area
  - Total: 36.3 km^{2} (14.0 sq mi)

Population (2011)
  - Total: 48,441
  - Density: 1,330/km^{2} (3,460/sq mi)

Languages
  - Official: Malayalam, English
- Time zone: UTC+5:30 (IST)
- Vehicle registration: KL-14

Mangalpady is a Grama Panchayat in Kasaragod district, Kerala. Uppala is the major town in this panchayat.

According to census 2011, Mangalpady village has a population of 12,790. As of census 2011, the panchayat has a population of 48,441 in an area of 36.3 square km. With a population density of 1332.5 per square km, it is one of the densely populated panchayats in Kerala.

== Villages in Mangalpady panchayat ==
- Mangalpady
- Bekoor
- Heroor
- Ichilangod
- Kodibail
- Kubanoor
- Mulinja

== Census towns in Mangalpady panchayat ==
- Uppala
- Bandiyod
- Mangalpady
- Shiriya

== Uppala Municipality Plan ==
If Uppala municipality is carved out from the Mangalpady and Manjeshwaram panchayat by adding the following to Uppala Census town:

- Census towns - Mangalpady, Shiriya, Bangra Manjeshwar, Hosabettu, Manjeshwar
- villages - Kodibail, Mulinja, Majibail and Badaje

Uppala Municipality will have a population of 66,431 in an area of 41.66 km^{2}. The population density of the municipality will be around 1,600 per km^{2}.

== Demographics ==
As of 2011 India census, Mangalpady had a population of 48441.

== Languages ==
This locality is an essentially multi-lingual region. The people speak Malayalam, Tulu, Kannada, Urdu, Beary bashe and Konkani. Migrant workers also speak Hindi and Tamil languages.

== Administration ==
This village is part of Manjeswaram assembly constituency which is again part of Kasaragod (Lok Sabha constituency)

== Transportation ==
Local roads have access to National Highway No.66 which connects to Mangalore in the north and Trivandrum in the south. The nearest railway station is Uppala on Mangalore-Palakkad line. There is an airport at Mangalore.
