= Meenja =

- Village
- Location in Kerala, India Meenja (India)
- Coordinates: 12°42′30″N 74°57′0″E
- Country: India
- State: Kerala
- District: Kasaragod
- Taluk: Manjeshwaram

Government
  - Body: Gram Panchayath

Area
  - Total: 44.9 km^{2} (17.3 sq mi)

Population (2011)
  - Total: 23,318
  - Density: 519/km^{2} (1,350/sq mi)

Languages
  - Official: Malayalam, English, Kannada
- Time zone: UTC+5:30 (IST)
- PIN: 671323
- Telephone code: 04998
- Vehicle registration: KL-14
- Nearest city: Uppala
- Lok Sabha constituency: Kasaragod
- Vidhan Sabha constituency: Manjeshwaram

Meenja is a grama Panchayat in Manjeshwaram Taluk of Kasaragod district in the state of Kerala, India. It consists of 7 revenue villages. Kaliyoor, Koliyoor, Talakala, Meenja, Kadambar, Moodambail and Kuloor.

== Demographics ==
As of 2011 Census, Meenja village had a population of 4,144 with 2,044 males and 2,100 females. Meenja village has an area of 10.16 km (6.31 mi) with 826 families residing in it. In Meenja, 11.1% of the population was under 6 years of age. Average literacy of Meenja village was 86.6% higher than the national average of 74% and lower than state average of 94%: among which 92.1% were male literates and 81.2% were female literates.

Meenja Grama Panchayat had 23,318 population among which 11,406 are males and 11,912 are females. Total number of households is 4,527 in the panchayat limits. Overall literacy rate was 87.5% lower than state average of 94%.

== Transportation ==
You can reach Miyapadav from Hosangadi and Uppala through local bus transportation. Local roads have access to National Highway No.66 which connects to Mangalore in the north and Kasaragod in the south. The nearest railway station is Manjeshwar and Uppala railway station on Mangalore-Palakkad line. The nearest airport is at Mangalore.

== Languages ==
This locality is an essentially multi-lingual region. The people speak Malayalam, Tulu, Beary bashe and Konkani. Migrant workers also speak Hindi and Tamil languages.

== Administration ==
This village is part of Manjeswaram assembly constituency which is again part of Kasaragod (Lok Sabha constituency)
