= Kokkachal =

Settlement in Kasaragod district, Kerala, India

Kokkachal കൊക്കച്ചാൽ
- Village / Hamlet
- Location in Kerala, India
- Coordinates: 12°39′24.8″N 74°57′50.1″E
- Country: India
- State: Kerala
- District: Kasaragod
- Taluk: Manjeshwaram
- Panchayat: Puthige / Mangalpady
- Time zone: UTC+5:30 (IST)
- PIN: 671322
- Telephone code: +91 04998
- Vehicle registration: KL-14

Kokkachal (കൊക്കച്ചാൽ, [ko̞kːɐt͡ʃːaːl]; also spelled Kokkechal) is a small locality and settlement situated in the Kasaragod district in the Indian state of Kerala. It falls under the administration of the Manjeshwaram taluk near the northern border of the state.

== Geography ==
Kokkachal is situated along the rural routes connecting Bandiyod (approximately 6.5 km away) and Dharmathadukka. Geographically, it sits close to the border of the Puthige and Mangalpady local government jurisdictions. The landscape is characterized by the typical midland topography of Northern Malabar, with seasonal streams feeding into larger coastal river systems.

== Education and Institutions ==
The locality is home to the Umerali Shihab Thangal Islamic Academy (Kokkachal Wafy College), a prominent higher education institute affiliated with the Coordination of Islamic Colleges (CIC), which provides combined religious and secular academic streams to students in the region.

== Transport ==
Local roads connect Kokkachal directly to the National Highway 66 (NH 66) corridor via Bandiyod, providing transit pathways north toward Mangalore in neighboring Karnataka and south toward Kasaragod and Kannur. The nearest railway station is Uppala railway station, and international transit is accessed via Mangalore International Airport.

== See also ==
- Kasaragod district
- Mangalpady
- Puthige
