= Koliyoor =

- village
- Location in Kerala, India Koliyoor (India)
- Coordinates: 12.73881°N 74.960619°E
- Country: India
- State: Kerala
- District: Kasaragod
- Taluk: Manjeshwaram

Government
  - Body: Meenja Grama Panchayat

Population (2011)
  - Total: 3,638

Languages
  - Official: Malayalam, English, Tulu, Kannada
- Time zone: UTC+5:30 (IST)
- PIN: 671323
- Vehicle registration: KL-14

Koliyoor is a village in Kasaragod district in the state of Kerala, India.

== Transportation ==
Local roads have access to National Highway No.66 which connects to Mangalore in the north and Calicut in the south. The nearest railway station is Manjeshwar on Mangalore-Palakkad line. There is an airport at Mangalore.

== Languages ==
This locality is an essentially multi-lingual region. The people speak Malayalam, Tulu, Beary bashe, Kannada and Konkani. Migrant workers also speak Hindi and Tamil languages.

== Administration ==
This village is part of Meenja Grama Panchayat, Manjeswaram assembly constituency which is again part of Kasaragod (Lok Sabha constituency)
