= Puthige, Kasaragod =

Puthige
- Village
- Location in Kerala, India Puthige (India)
- Coordinates: 12.61906°N 75.01293°E
- Country: India
- State: Kerala
- District: Kasaragod
- Taluk: Manjeshwaram

Government
  - Body: Grama Panchayath

Area
  - Total: 39.61 km^{2} (15.29 sq mi)

Population (2011)
  - Total: 21,823
  - Density: 550.9/km^{2} (1,427/sq mi)

Languages
  - Official: Malayalam, English
- Time zone: UTC+05:30 (IST)
- PIN: 671321

Puthige is a small village with its own panchayat administration, located in the Kasaragod district of Kerala, India.

== Languages ==
This locality is an essentially multi-lingual region. The people speak Malayalam, Kannada, Tulu, Beary bashe and Konkani. Migrant workers also speak Hindi and Tamil languages.

== Administration ==
This village is part of Manjeswaram assembly constituency which is again part of Kasaragod (Lok Sabha constituency)

== Constituent villages ==
The following 14 wards are the constituent villages of the Puthige Panchayath administration system.

1. Chennikodi
2. Dharmathadka
3. Deradka
4. Badoor
5. Mugu
6. Urmi
7. Ujampadavu
8. Seethangoli
9. Kannur-puthige
10. Edanad
11. Mukarikanda
12. Puthige
13. Kathib nagar
14. Angadimogar

== See also ==
- Kattathadka
- Seethangoli
