= Vorkady =

- Gram Panchayat
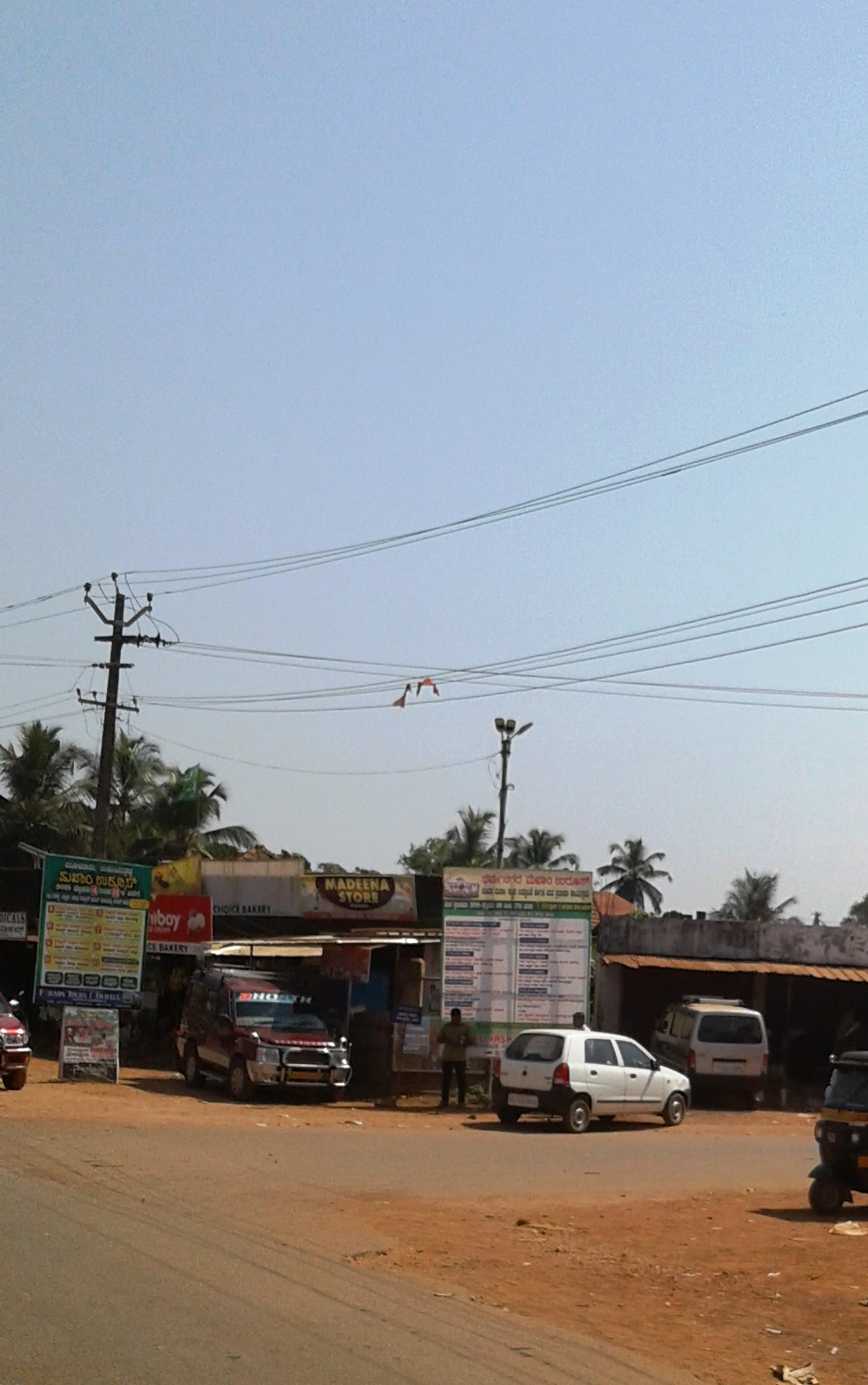
- Majeerpalla Vorkady

- Location in Kerala, India Vorkady (India)
- Coordinates: 12.7598°N 74.9311°E
- Country: India
- State: Kerala
- District: Kasaragod

Area
  - Total: 45.4 km^{2} (17.5 sq mi)

Population (2011)
  - Total: 25,756
  - Density: 567/km^{2} (1,470/sq mi)

Languages
  - Official: Malayalam, Kannada, English
- Time zone: UTC+5:30 (IST)
- Vehicle registration: KL-14

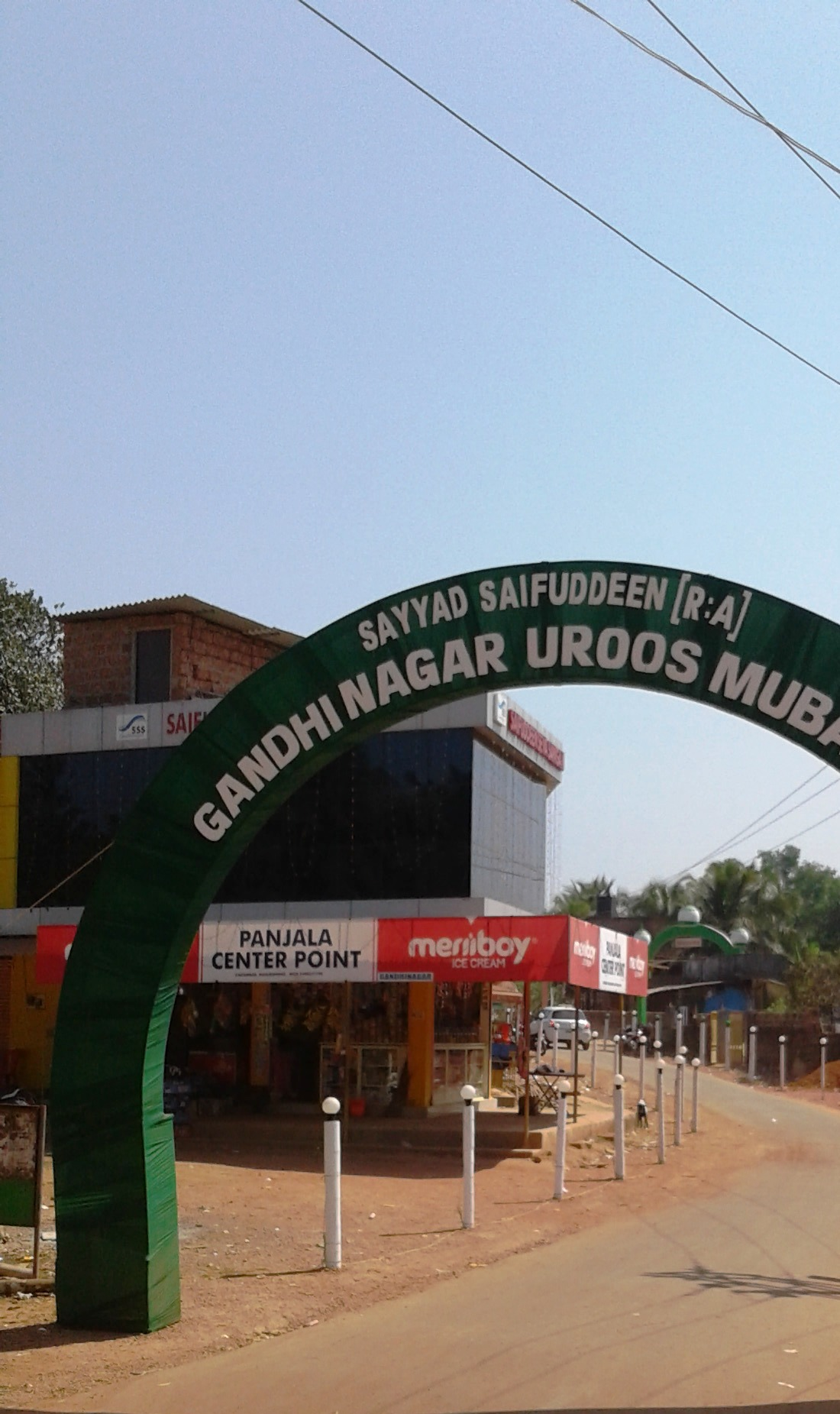
Gandhinagar

Vorkady is a Gram Panchayat in Kasaragod district in the state of Kerala, India.

== Demographics ==
As of 2011 Census, Vorkady village had population of 8,787 which constitutes 4,350 (49.5%) males and 4,437 (50.5%) females. Vorkady village has an area of 13.51 km^{2} (5.22 sq mi) with 1,737 families residing in it. In Vorkady, 11.4% of the population was under 6 years of age. Vorkady had an average literacy of 87.4% higher than the national average of 74% and lower than state average of 94%: male literacy was 93.2% and female literacy was 81.8%.

Vorkady Grama Panchayat consists of 4 revenue villages. Vorkady, Pathur, Pavoor and Kodalamogaru. Vorkady Grama Panchayat had 25,576 population where 12,767 are males and 12,989 are females. Total number of households were 4,751 in the panchayat limits. Vorkady Panchayat had an average literacy of 85.8% lower than state average of 94%.

== Transportation ==
Local roads have access to National Highway No.66 which connects to Mangalore in the north and Kasaragod in the south. The nearest railway station is Manjeshwar on Mangalore-Palakkad nearest airport is Mangalore in Karnataka state.

== Languages ==
This locality is an essentially multi-lingual region. The people speak Malayalam, Tulu, Beary bashe and Konkani. Migrant workers also speak Hindi language.

== Administration ==
This village is part of Manjeswaram assembly constituency which is again part of Kasaragod (Lok Sabha constituency).

== See also ==
- Uppala
- Manjeshwaram
