= Sajankila =

- village
- Location within Kerala Location within India
- Coordinates: 12°41′19″N 75°1′4″E
- Country: India
- State: Kerala
- District: Kasaragod
- Gram Panchayat: Paivalike
- Time zone: UTC+5:30 (IST)

Sajankila is a small village in Bayar Village in the Kasaragod district, state of Kerala, India.

== Administration ==
Sajankila is administrated by the Paivalike gram panchayat.

== Economy ==
Farmers make up the majority occupation of the people, growing: Arecanut, Coconut, Black Pepper, Banana and Rubber plantation.

== Languages ==
This locality is an essentially multi-lingual region. The people speak Malayalam, Urdu, Tulu, Beary bashe and Konkani. Migrant workers also speak Hindi Marathi and Kannada languages.

== Administration ==
This village is part of Manjeswaram assembly constituency which is again part of Kasaragod (Lok Sabha constituency)

== Demographics ==
The majority of the inhabitants are Hindus; Muslims also have a presence.

== Schools ==
There is a primary school (instruction in the Kannada and Malayalam languages). This village maintains the Mangalore culture and traditions.

== Temples ==
The temple of Shri Durgaparameshwari Deity is located in this village and is also called Avala Mutt. This is one of the sacred places of worship of the Karada community. Also, there is Sajankila Bhajana Mandira near the Sajankila Bus Stop.

== Transportation ==
Reaching Sajankila is easy from Uppala Village near Kasaragod. Regular buses run between Uppala and Sajankila.

Local roads have access to National Highway No.66 which connects to Mangalore in the north and Calicut in the south. The nearest railway station is Manjeshwar on Mangalore-Palakkad line. There is an airport at Mangalore.
