= Talakala =

Talakala Talikala
- village
- Location in Kerala, India Talakala (India)
- Coordinates: 12.7230°N 74.9472°E
- Country: India
- State: Kerala
- District: Kasaragod
- Taluk: Manjeshwaram

Languages
  - Official: Malayalam, English
- Time zone: UTC+5:30 (IST)
- PIN: 671323
- Vehicle registration: KL-14

Talikala is a village in Kasaragod district in the state of Kerala, India.

== Transportation ==
The local roads have access to National Highway No.66, which connects to Mangalore in the north and Calicut in the south. The nearest railway station is Manjeshwar on the Mangalore-Palakkad line. There is an airport at Mangalore.

== Languages ==
This locality is an essentially multi-lingual region. The people speak Malayalam, Tulu, Beary bashe and Konkani. Migrant workers also speak Hindi and Tamil languages.

== Administration ==
This village is part of Manjeshwaram (State Assembly constituency) which is again part of Kasaragod (Lok Sabha constituency)
