= Paivalike =

- Village
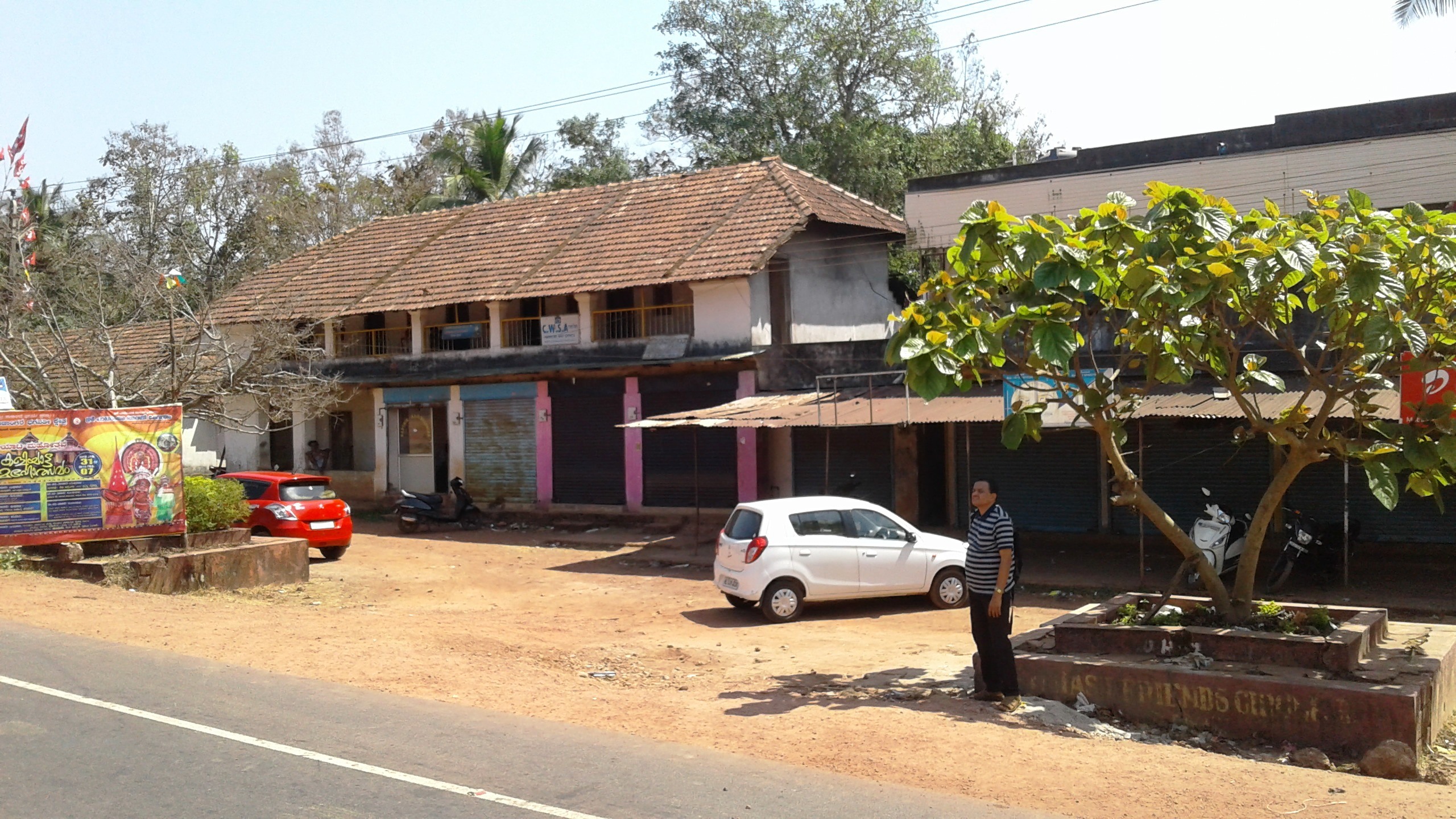
- Paivalike Lalbagh

- Location in Kerala, India Paivalike (India)
- Coordinates: 12°41′15″N 74°59′0″E
- Country: India
- State: Kerala
- District: Kasaragod

Government
  - Type: Grama Panchayat

Area
  - Total: 72.5 km^{2} (28.0 sq mi)

Population (2011)
  - Total: 27,755
  - Density: 383/km^{2} (992/sq mi)

Languages
  - Official: Malayalam
- Time zone: UTC+5:30 (IST)
- Vehicle registration: KL-14

Paivalike is a village in Kasaragod district in the state of Kerala, India. Paivalike is 11 km (6.8 mi) east of Uppala town and 40 km (25 mi) south of Mangalore city.

== Demographics ==
As of 2011 Census, Paivalike village had a population of 9,034 with 4,458 males and 4,576 females. Paivalike village has an area of 20.36 km^{2} (7.86 sq mi) with 1,605 families residing in the village limits. In Paivalike, 12.3% of the population was under 6 years of age. Paivalike had an average literacy of 87.9% higher than the national average of 74% and lower than state average of 94%:.male literacy was 93.6% and female literacy was 82.4%.

Paivalike Grama Panchayat has 5 revenue villages. Paivalike, Bayar, Chippar, Kudalmarkala and Badoor. Paivalike Grama Panchayat had 34,274 population which constitutes 17,259 males and 17,015 females. Total number of households in the panchayat was 6,212. Average literacy rate of panchayat was 89.2%.

== Transportation ==
Uppala-Bayar-Kanyana road connects Paivalike with Uppala town and National Highway 66 which connects to Mangalore in the north and Kasaragod in the south. The nearest railway station is Uppala railway station on Mangalore-Palakkad line. The nearest international airport is at Mangalore.

== Languages ==
This locality is an essentially multi-lingual region. The people speak Malayalam, Tulu, Beary bashe and Konkani.

== Administration ==
This village is part of Manjeswaram assembly constituency which is again part of Kasaragod (Lok Sabha constituency)

== Image gallery ==
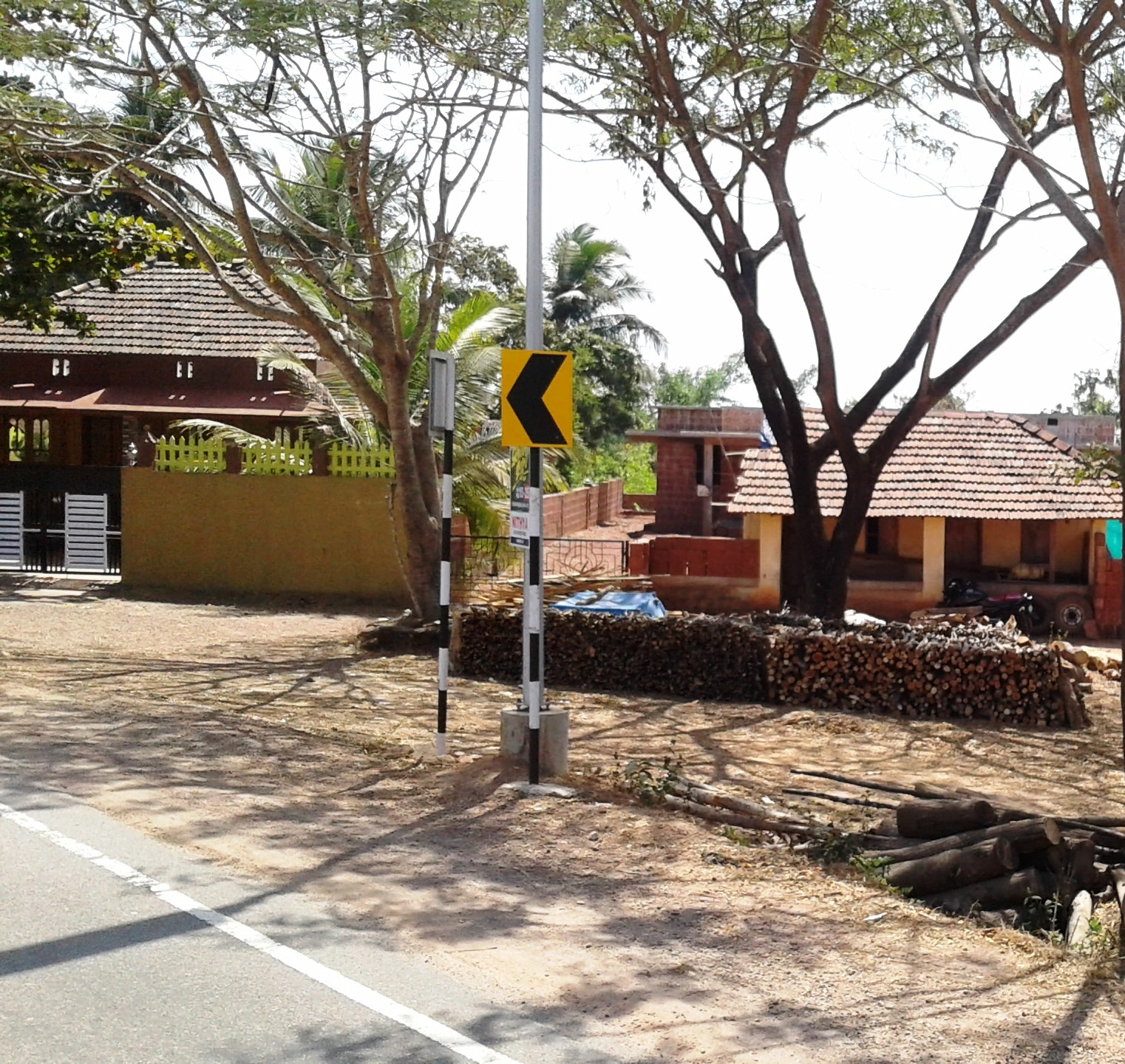
Kayarkatte

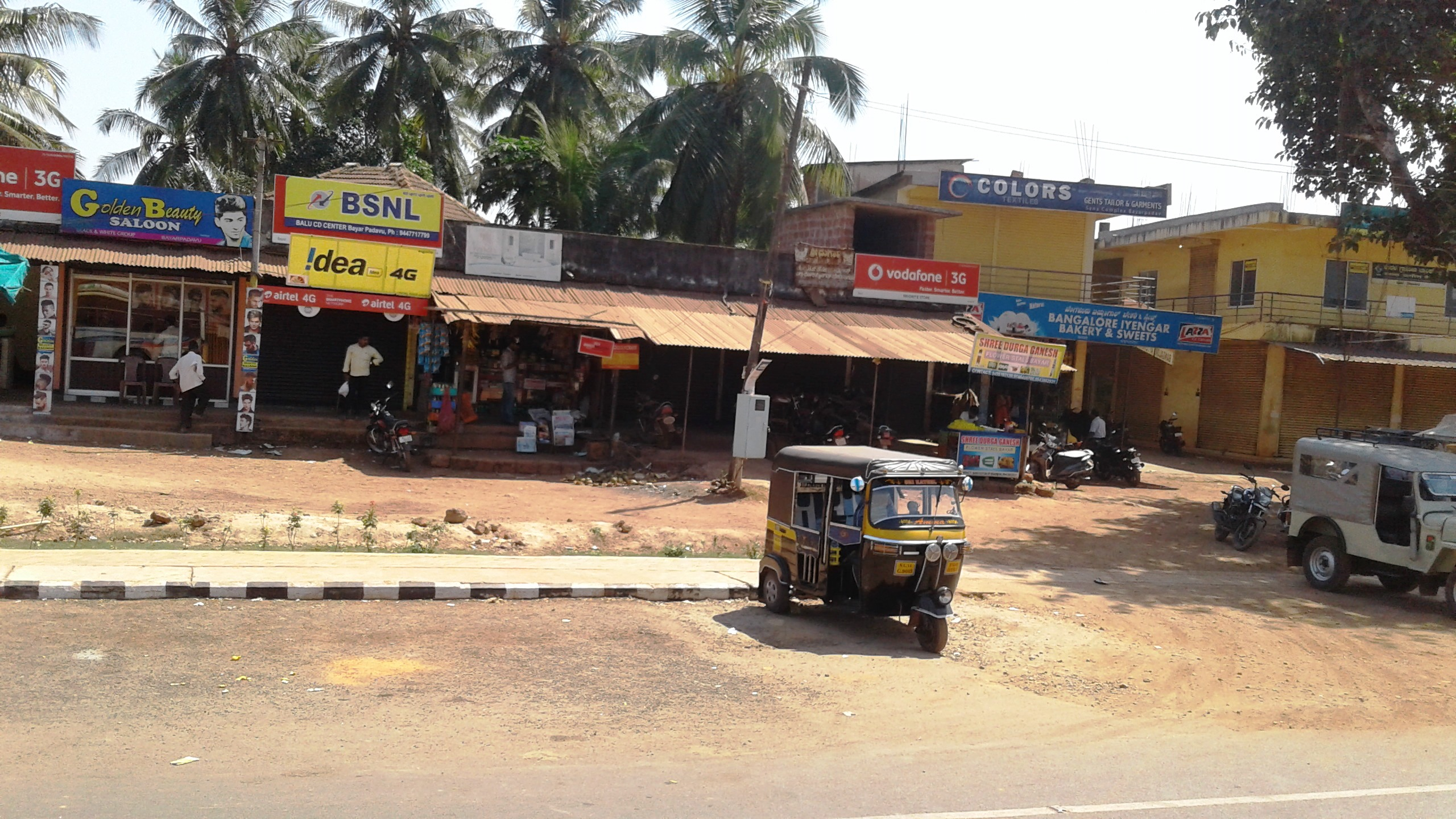
Bayarpadavu

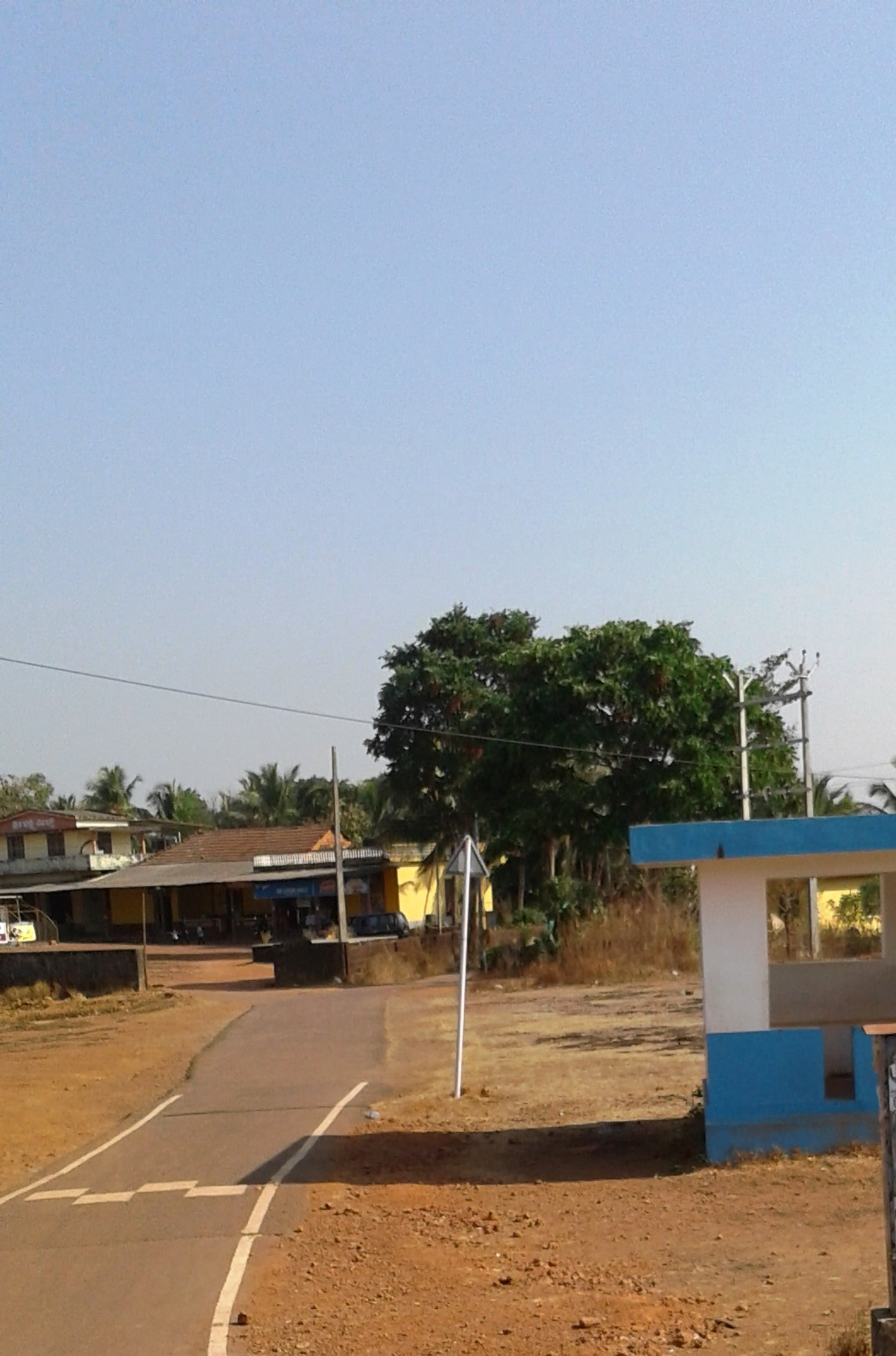
Batikkatta

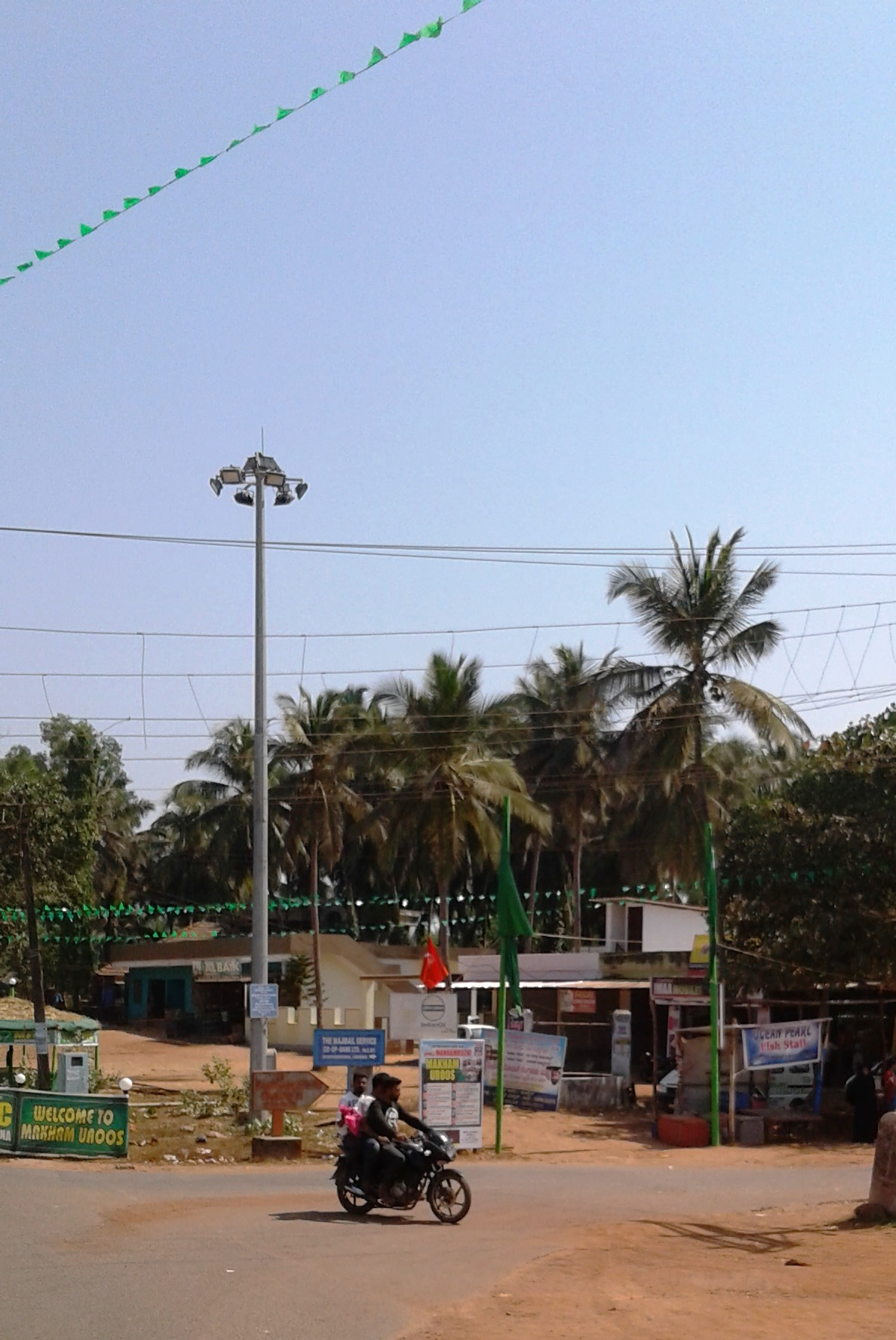
Morthana
