= Chippar =

- village
- Location in Kerala, India Chippar (India)
- Coordinates: 12°42′0″N 74°59′0″E
- Country: India
- State: Kerala
- District: Kasaragod
- Taluk: Manjeshwaram

Population (2011)
  - Total: 2,285

Languages
  - Official: Malayalam, English
- Time zone: UTC+5:30 (IST)
- PIN: 671322
- Vehicle registration: KL-14

Chippar is a village in Kasaragod district in the state of Kerala, India.

== Demographics ==
As of 2011 census, Chippar village had population of 2,285 among which 1,145 are males and 1,140 are females. Total number of households are 429 in the village. Average literacy rate of Chippar is 90.5 % lower than state average of 94 %. Male literacy stands at 94.5 % and Female literacy at 86.5 %.

== Transportation ==
Local roads have access to National Highway No.66 which connects to Mangalore in the north and Calicut in the south. The nearest railway station is Manjeshwar on Shoranur-Mangalore line. There is an airport at Mangalore.

== Languages ==
This locality is an essentially multi-lingual region. The people speak Malayalam, Tulu, Beary bashe and Konkani. Migrant workers also speak Hindi and Tamil languages. This village is part of Manjeswaram assembly constituency which is again part of Kasaragod (Lok Sabha constituency)
