= Kattukukke =

Katukukke
- village
- Location in Kerala, India
- Coordinates: 12.6640°N 75.1370°E
- Country: India
- State: Kerala
- District: Kasaragod
- Taluk: Manjeshwaram

Area
  - Total: 13.62 km^{2} (5.26 sq mi)

Population (2011)
  - Total: 3,955
  - Density: 290.4/km^{2} (752.1/sq mi)

Languages
  - Official: Malayalam, English, Kannada
- Time zone: UTC+5:30 (IST)
- PIN: 671552
- Vehicle registration: KL-14

Katukukke is a village in Kasaragod district in the state of Kerala, India. The village is home to the famous Shri Subraya Deva Temple, from which it derives its name.

== Demographics ==
As of 2011 Census, Katukukke village had population of 3,955 which constitutes 2,002 males and 1,953 females. Katukukke village spreads over an area of 13.62 km^{2} (5.26 sq mi) with 797 families residing in it. The male female sex ratio was 976 lower than Kerala state average of 1084. Population in the age group 0-6 was 365 (9.2%) where 193 are males and 172 are females. Katukukke had overall literacy of 87.2% lower than state average of 94% where male literacy stands at 92.3% and female literacy was 82.1%.

== Transportation ==
Local roads have access to National Highway No.66 which connects to Mangalore in the north and Calicut in the south. The nearest railway station is Manjeshwar on Mangalore-Palakkad line. There is an airport at Mangalore.

== Languages ==
This locality is an essentially multi-lingual region. The main languages spoken here is Tulu. The people also speak Malayalam, Havyaka, Beary bashe and Konkani.

== Administration ==
This village is part of Manjeshwar Assembly constituency which is again part of Kasaragod Lok Sabha constituency
