= Ichilangod =

- village
- Location in Kerala, India Ichilangod (India)
- Coordinates: 12°38′0″N 74°57′0″E
- Country: India
- State: Kerala
- District: Kasaragod
- Taluk: Manjeshwaram

Population (2011)
  - Total: 4,148

Languages
  - Official: Malayalam, English
- Time zone: UTC+5:30 (IST)
- PIN: 671324
- Vehicle registration: KL-14

Ichilangod is a village in Kasaragod district in the state of Kerala, India.

== Demographics ==
As of 2011 census, Ichilangod village had population of 4,148 among which 1,991 are males and 2,157 are females. Total number of households in village was 789. Overall literacy of Ichilangod is 90.3 % lower than state average of 94 %. Male literacy stands at 95.2 % and Female literacy at 86 %.

== Transportation ==
Local roads have access to National Highway No.66 which connects to Mangalore in the north and Calicut in the south. The nearest railway station is Manjeshwar on Mangalore-Palakkad line. There is an airport at Mangalore.

== Languages ==
This locality is an essentially multi-lingual region. The people speak Malayalam, Tulu, Beary bashe and Konkani. Migrant workers also speak Hindi and Tamil languages. This village is part of Manjeswaram assembly constituency which is again part of Kasaragod (Lok Sabha constituency)
