= Kidoor =

Village in Kerala, India

- village
- Location in Kerala, India Kidoor (India)
- Coordinates: 12°38′0″N 74°59′0″E
- Country: India
- State: Kerala
- District: Kasaragod
- Taluk: Manjeshwaram

Area
  - Total: 5.95 km^{2} (2.30 sq mi)

Population (2011)
  - Total: 2,569
  - Density: 432/km^{2} (1,120/sq mi)

Languages
  - Official: Malayalam, English
- Time zone: UTC+5:30 (IST)
- PIN: 671321
- Vehicle registration: KL-14

Kidoor is a village in Kasaragod district in the state of Kerala, India.

== Demographics ==
As of 2011 Census, Kidoor village had total population of 2,569 which constitutes 1,300 males and 1,269 females. Kidoor village has an area of 5.95 km^{2} (2.30 sq mi) with 493 families residing in it. The sex ratio of Kidoor was 976 lower than state average of 1,084. In Kidoor, 9.4% of the population was under 6 years of age. Kidoor village had an average literacy of 86.3% lower than state average of 94%. The male literacy stands at 90.6% and female literacy was 81.9%.

== Transportation ==
Local roads have access to National Highway No.66 which connects to Mangalore in the north and Calicut in the south. The nearest railway station is Kumbla on Mangalore-Palakkad line. There is an airport at Mangalore.

== Languages ==
This locality is an essentially multi-lingual region. The people speak Malayalam, Kannada, Tulu, Beary bashe and Konkani And Urdu. Migrant workers also speak Hindi and Tamil languages.

== Administration ==
This village is part of Manjeswaram assembly constituency which is again part of Kasaragod (Lok Sabha constituency).

== Image Gallery ==
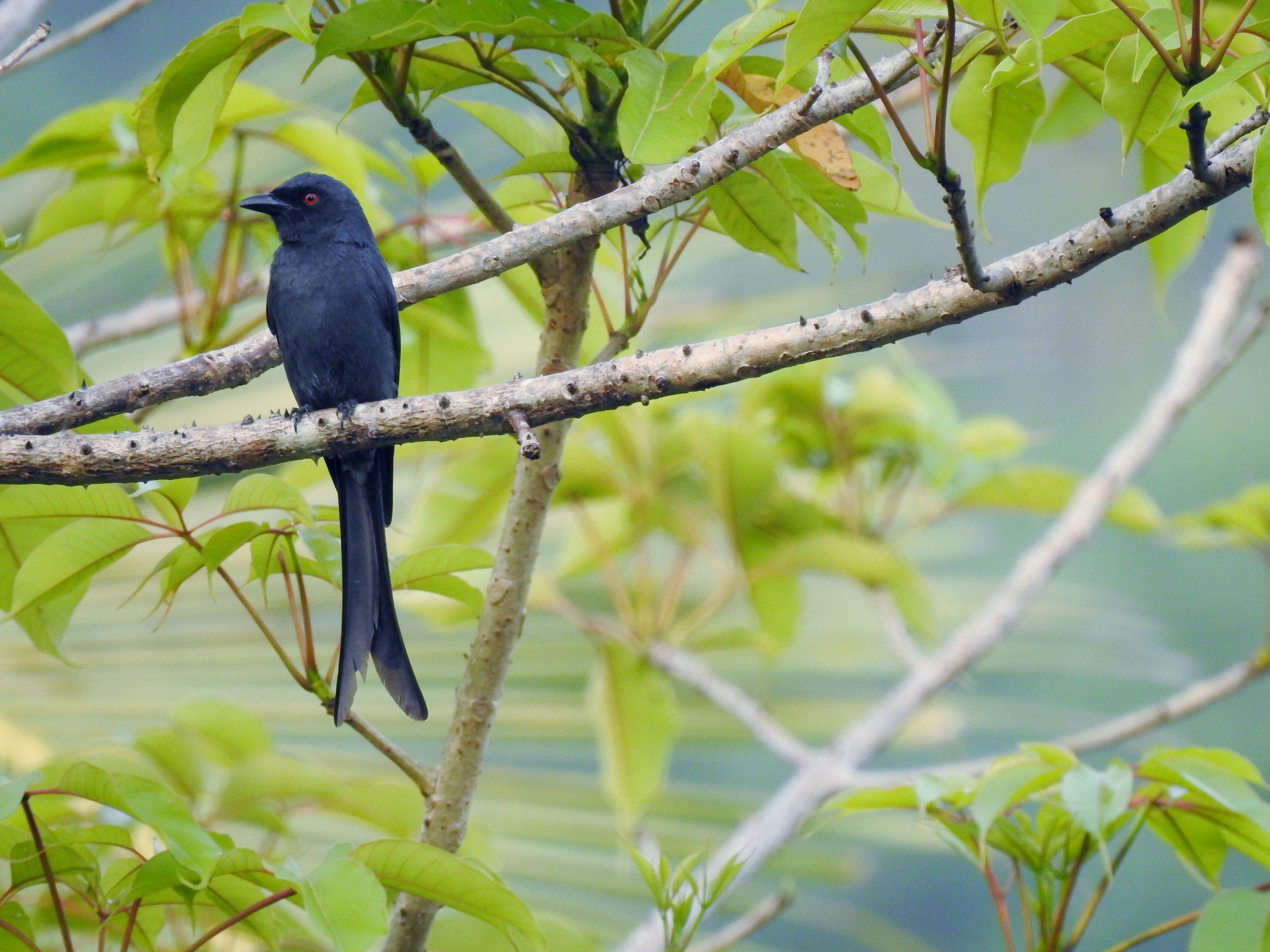
Ashy Drongo at Kidoor in Kasaragod, India
