= Kayyar =

Kayyar Mile Kal
- village
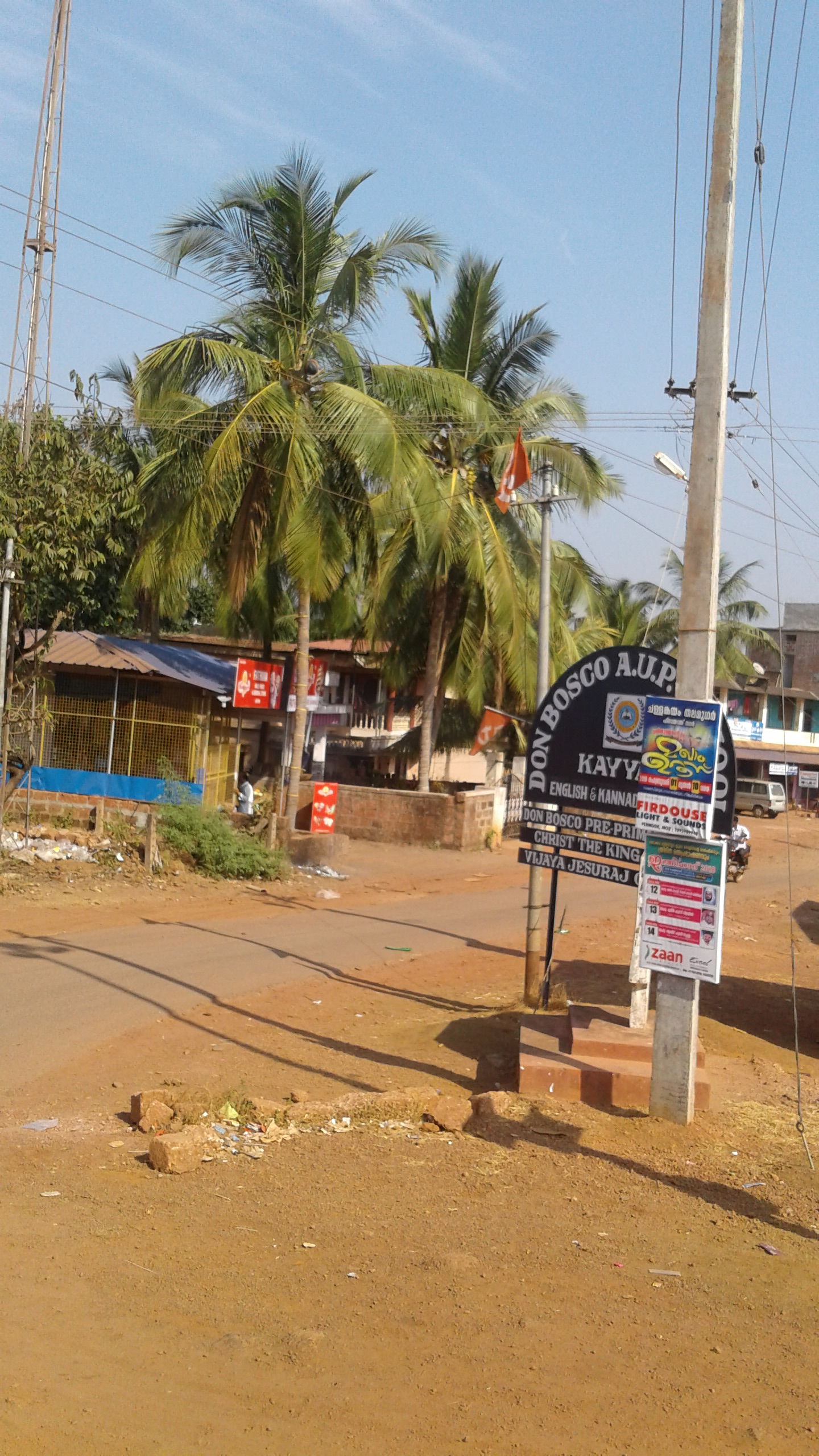
- Kayyar village

- Location in Kerala, India Kayyar (India)
- Coordinates: 12°39′30″N 74°59′0″E
- Country: India
- State: Kerala
- District: Kasaragod
- Talukas: Manjeshwaram

Languages
  - Official: Tulu, Malayalam, Konkani, English
- Time zone: UTC+5:30 (IST)
- PIN: 671322
- Vehicle registration: KL-14

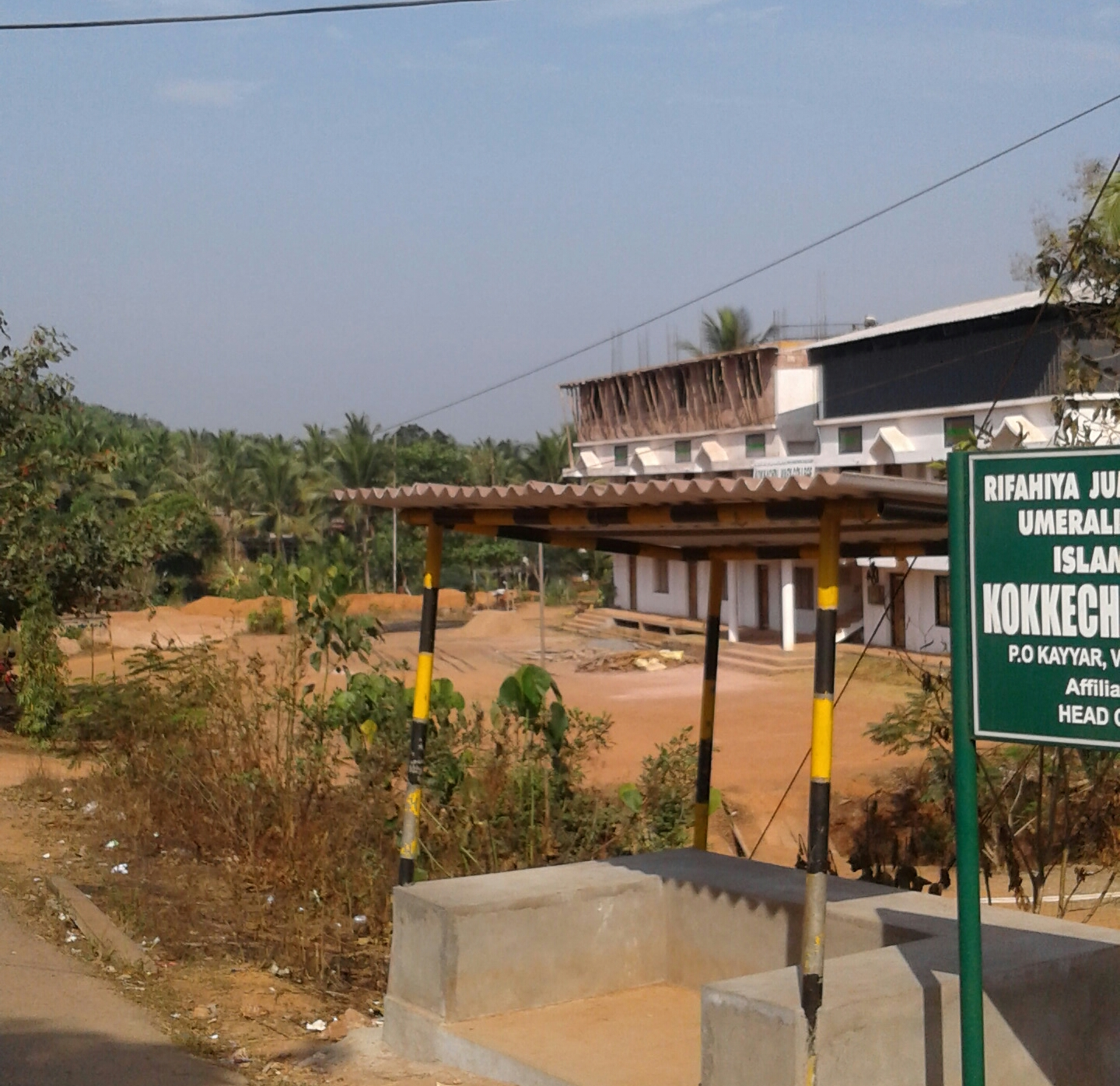
Wafi College

Kayyar is a village in Kasaragod district in the state of Kerala, India. Kayyara Kinhanna Rai an Indian independence activist, author, poet, journalist, teacher and farmer was born in Kayyar.

Don Bosco primary school is situated in Kayyar.

== Transportation ==
Local roads have access to National Highway No.66 which connects to Mangalore in the north and Calicut in the south. The nearest railway station is Manjeshwar on Mangalore-Palakkad line. There is an airport at Mangalore.

== Languages ==
This locality is an essentially multi-lingual region. The people speak Kannada, Malayalam, Tulu, Beary bashe and Konkani. Migrant workers also speak Hindi and Tamil languages.

== Administration ==
This village is part of Manjeswaram assembly constituency which is again part of Kasaragod (Lok Sabha constituency).
