= Mugu, Kasaragod =

Village in Kerala, India

Mugu
- village
- Location in Kerala, India
- Coordinates: 12.6051°N 75.0100°E
- Country: India
- State: Kerala
- District: Kasaragod
- Taluk: Manjeshwaram

Government
  - Body: Puthige Grama Panchayat

Area
  - Total: 5.3 km^{2} (2.0 sq mi)

Population (2011)
  - Total: 2,951
  - Density: 560/km^{2} (1,400/sq mi)

Languages
  - Official: Malayalam, English
- Time zone: UTC+5:30 (IST)
- PIN: 671321
- Vehicle registration: KL-14

Mugu is a village in Manjeshwaram Taluk of Kasaragod district in Kerala, India.

== Demographics ==
As of 2011 Census, Mugu village had population of 2,951 which constitutes 1,416 males and 1,535 females. The male female sex ratio was 1084 same as state average of 1084. Mugu village has an area of 5.3 km^{2} (2.0 sq mi) with 521 families residing in it. Population in the age group 0-6 was 372 (12.6%) where 182 are males and 190 are females. Mugu had overall literacy of 90.3% lower than state average of 94%. Male literacy stands at 94.7% and Female literacy was 86.2%.

== Administration ==
Mugu village is part of Puthige Grama Panchayat. The village politically belongs to Manjeshwar (State Assembly constituency) which is part of Kasaragod (Lok Sabha constituency).
