= Hosabettu, Kasaragod =

Hosabettu
- Census Town
- Location in Kerala, India Hosabettu (India)
- Coordinates: 12.7140°N 74.8887°E
- Country: India
- State: Kerala
- District: Kasaragod
- Taluk: Manjeshwaram

Government
  - Body: Manjeshwar Grama Panchayat

Area
  - Total: 2.55 km^{2} (0.98 sq mi)

Population (2011)
  - Total: 5,179
  - Density: 2,030/km^{2} (5,260/sq mi)

Languages
  - Official: Malayalam, English
- Time zone: UTC+5:30 (IST)
- PIN: 671323
- Vehicle registration: KL-14

Hosabettu is a census town in Manjeshwar Grama Panchayat of Kasaragod district in Kerala state, India.

== Demographics ==
As per 2011 Census, Hosabettu census town, with an area of 2.55 km^{2} (0.98 sq mi) had total population of 5,179, where 2,591 are males and 2,588 are females. The sex ratio is 999 women per 1000 men. The population of children in the age group 0-6 is 562, which is 10.9% of the total population. The total number of households is 666 in the town limits. Hosabettu town has an overall literacy rate of 88.9%, where male literacy stands at 92.7%, and female literacy at 85.2%.

== Religions ==
Hosabettu town has 62.6% Muslims, 32.6% Hindus, 4.7% Christians and 0.1% Others.

== Administration ==
This village is part of Manjeshwar (State Assembly constituency) which belongs to Kasaragod (Lok Sabha constituency).
