= Ujarulvar =

- village
- Location in Kerala, India
- Coordinates: 12.6274°N 74.9603°E
- Country: India
- State: Kerala
- District: Kasaragod
- Taluk: Manjeshwaram

Area
  - Total: 1.7 km^{2} (0.66 sq mi)

Population (2011)
  - Total: 1,328
  - Density: 780/km^{2} (2,000/sq mi)

Languages
  - Official: Malayalam, English
- Time zone: UTC+5:30 (IST)
- PIN: 671321
- Vehicle registration: KL-14

Ujarulvar is a village in Kasaragod district in the state of Kerala, India.

== Demographics ==
As of 2011 Census, Ujarulvar had a population of 1,328 with 591 males and 737 females. Ujarulvar village has an area of 1.7 km^{2} (0.66 sq mi) with 245 families residing in it. The average sex ratio was 1247 higher than the state average of 1084. In Ujarulvar, 15.1% of the population was under 6 years of age. Ujarulvar had an average literacy of 83.9% higher than the national average of 74% and lower than state average of 94%.
