= Mulinja =

- village
- Location in Kerala, India Mulinja (India)
- Coordinates: 12°41′0″N 74°55′0″E
- Country: India
- State: Kerala
- District: Kasaragod
- Taluk: Manjeshwaram

Area
  - Total: 2.24 km^{2} (0.86 sq mi)

Population (2011)
  - Total: 3,841
  - Density: 1,710/km^{2} (4,440/sq mi)

Languages
  - Official: Malayalam, English
- Time zone: UTC+5:30 (IST)
- PIN: 6XXXXX
- Vehicle registration: KL-14

Mulinja is a locality part of Uppala town, Kasaragod district, Kerala, India.

== Demographics ==
As of 2011 India census, Mulinja village had total population of 3,841 which constitutes 1,803 males and 2,038 females. Mulinja village spreads over an area of 2.24 km^{2} with 751 families residing in it. Population in the age group 0-6 was 506 (13.2%) where 255 are males and 251 are females. Mulinja village had overall literacy of 91.2% where male literacy was 95.9% and female literacy of 87.1%.

== Transportation ==
Local roads have access to National Highway No.66 which connects to Mangalore in the north and Calicut in the south. The nearest railway station is Manjeshwar on Mangalore-Palakkad line. There is an airport at Mangalore.

== Languages ==
This locality is an essentially multi-lingual region. The people speak Malayalam, Tulu, Beary bashe and Konkani. Migrant workers also speak Hindi and Tamil languages.

== Administration ==
This village is part of Manjeswaram assembly constituency which is again part of Kasaragod (Lok Sabha constituency)
