= Bombrana =

- village
- Location in Kerala, India Bombrana (India)
- Coordinates: 12.628700°N 74.949440°E
- Country: India
- State: Kerala
- District: Kasaragod
- Taluk: Manjeshwaram

Government
  - Type: Panchayati raj (India)
  - Body: Kumbla Grama Panchayat

Population (2011)
  - Total: 6,473

Languages
  - Official: Malayalam, English
- Time zone: UTC+5:30 (IST)
- PIN: 671321
- Vehicle registration: KL-14

Bombrana is a village in Kasaragod district in the state of Kerala, India.

== Demographics ==
As of 2011 India census, Bombrana village had total population of 6,473 which constitutes 3,057 males and 3,416 females. Population of children in the age group of 0-6 was 914 (14.1%) where 452 are boys and 462 are girls. Bombrana village had overall literacy rate of 88.8% where male literacy was 93.5% and female literacy was 84.6%.
