= Edanad, Kasaragod =

Village in Kerala, India

Edanad
- village
- Location in Kerala, India
- Coordinates: 12.6031°N 74.9998°E
- Country: India
- State: Kerala
- District: Kasaragod
- Taluk: Manjeshwaram

Government
  - Body: Puthige Grama Panchayat

Area
  - Total: 6.85 km^{2} (2.64 sq mi)

Population (2011)
  - Total: 2,922
  - Density: 427/km^{2} (1,100/sq mi)

Languages
  - Official: Malayalam, English
- Time zone: UTC+5:30 (IST)
- PIN: 671321
- Vehicle registration: KL-14

Edanad is a village in Manjeshwaram Taluk of Kasaragod district in Kerala, India.

== Demographics ==
As of 2011 Census, Edanad village had population of 2,922 which constitutes 1,441 males and 1,481 females. The male female sex ratio was 1027 lower than state average of 1084. Edanad village has an area of 6.85 km^{2} (2.64 sq mi) with 610 families residing in it. Population in the age group 0-6 was 318 (10.9%) where 155 are males and 163 are females. Edanad had overall literacy of 89.6% lower than state average of 94%. Male literacy stands at 94.2% and Female literacy was 85.1%.

== Administration ==
Edanad village is part of Puthige Grama Panchayat. The village politically belongs to Manjeshwar (State Assembly constituency) which is part of Kasaragod (Lok Sabha constituency).
