= Kodalamogaru =

- Village
- Location in Kerala, India Kodalamogaru (India)
- Coordinates: 12.7507°N 74.9663°E
- Country: India
- State: Kerala
- District: Kasaragod

Area
  - Total: 12.3 km^{2} (4.7 sq mi)

Population (2011)
  - Total: 5,788
  - Density: 471/km^{2} (1,220/sq mi)

Languages
  - Official: Malayalam, English
- Time zone: UTC+5:30 (IST)
- Vehicle registration: KL-14

Kodalamogaru is a village in Manjeshwaram taluk of Kasaragod district in the state of Kerala, India.

== Demographics ==
As of 2011 India census, Kodalamogaru had a population of 5,788, with 2,906 males and 2,882 females.

== Transportation ==
Local roads have access to National Highway No.66 which connects to Mangalore in the north and Calicut in the south. The nearest railway station is Manjeshwar on the Mangalore-Palakkad line. There is an airport at Mangalore.

== Languages ==
This locality is an essentially multi-lingual region. The people speak Kannada, Malayalam, Tulu, Beary bashe and Konkani. Migrant workers also speak Hindi language.

== Administration ==
This village is part of Manjeswaram assembly constituency, which is again part of the Kasaragod Lok Sabha constituency.
