= Majibail =

- village
- Location in Kerala, India Majibail (India)
- Coordinates: 12°41′44″N 74°54′0″E
- Country: India
- State: Kerala
- District: Kasaragod
- Talukas: Manjeshwaram

Area
  - Total: 3.43 km^{2} (1.32 sq mi)

Population (2011)
  - Total: 1,485
  - Density: 433/km^{2} (1,120/sq mi)

Languages
  - Official: Malayalam, English
- Time zone: UTC+5:30 (IST)
- PIN: 6XXXXX
- Vehicle registration: KL-

Majibail is a village in Kasaragod district in the state of Kerala, India.

== Transportation ==
Local roads have access to National Highway No.66 which connects to Mangalore in the north and Calicut in the south. The nearest railway station is Manjeshwar on Mangalore-Palakkad line. There is an airport at Mangalore.

== Languages ==
This locality is an essentially multi-lingual region. The people speak Malayalam, Tulu, Beary bashe and Konkani. Migrant workers also speak Hindi and Tamil languages.

== Administration ==
This village is part of Manjeswaram assembly constituency which is again part of Kasaragod (Lok Sabha constituency)
