= Padre, Kasaragod =

Village in Kerala, India

Padre
- village
- Location in Kerala, India
- Coordinates: 12.6193°N 75.1370°E
- Country: India
- State: Kerala
- District: Kasaragod
- Taluk: Manjeshwaram

Government
  - Body: Enmakaje Grama Panchayat

Area
  - Total: 15.97 km^{2} (6.17 sq mi)

Population (2011)
  - Total: 5,092
  - Density: 318.8/km^{2} (825.8/sq mi)

Languages
  - Official: Malayalam, English
- Time zone: UTC+5:30 (IST)
- PIN: 671552
- Vehicle registration: KL-14

Padre is a village in Manjeshwaram Taluk of Kasaragod district in Kerala, India.

== Demographics ==
As of 2011 Census, Padre village had population of 5,092 which constitutes 2,586 males and 2,506 females. The male female sex ratio was 969 lower than state average of 1084. Padre village has an area of 15.97 km^{2} (6.17 sq mi) with 970 families residing in it. Population in the age group 0-6 was 417 (8.2%) where 215 are males and 202 are females. Padre had overall literacy of 84.6% lower than state average of 94%. Male literacy stands at 90.9% and Female literacy was 78%.

== Administration ==
Padre village is part of Enmakaje Grama Panchayat. Politically it comes under Manjeshwar (State Assembly constituency) which is part of Kasaragod (Lok Sabha constituency).
