= Koipady =

- Census Town
- Location in Kerala, India
- Coordinates: 12°35′53.007″N 74°57′43.116″E
- Country: India
- State: Kerala
- District: Kasaragod
- Taluk: Manjeshwaram

Area
  - Total: 13.43 km^{2} (5.19 sq mi)

Population (2011)
  - Total: 18,121
  - Density: 1,349/km^{2} (3,495/sq mi)

Languages
  - Official: Malayalam, English
- Time zone: UTC+5:30 (IST)
- Postal code: 671321
- Vehicle registration: KL-14

Koipady is a census town in Kasaragod district in the state of Kerala, India. Koipady is a part of Kumbla Grama Panchayat.

== Demographics ==
As of the 2011 Census of India, Koipady census town had a population of 18,121, with 9,012 males and 9,109 females. The female sex ratio was 1011 against state average of 1084. The total number of households was 3,541 in the town limits.

The population of children in the age group 0-6 was 2,006 which accounts for 11.07% of the total population. The child sex ratio was 933 compared to state average of 964. The literacy rate of Koipady town was 90% lower compared to state average of 94%. Male literacy stood at 93.86%, while female literacy was 86.23%.
