= Pathur, Kasaragod =

Pathur
- village
- Location in Kerala, India Pathur (India)
- Coordinates: 12.7739000°N 74.981760°E
- Country: India
- State: Kerala
- District: Kasaragod

Population (2011)
  - Total: 6,383

Languages
  - Official: Malayalam, English
- Time zone: UTC+5:30 (IST)
- Vehicle registration: KL-14
- Nearest city: Mangalore, Kasaragod

Pathur is a village in Kasaragod district in the state of Kerala, India.

== Demographics ==
As of 2011 India census, Pathur had a population of 6,383, with 3,118 males and 3,265 females.

== Languages ==
This locality is essentially multi-lingual. The people speak Malayalam, Kannada, Tulu, Beary bashe and Konkani. Migrant workers also speak Hindi and Tamil languages.

== Administration ==
This village is part of Manjeswaram assembly constituency, which is again part of the Kasaragod Lok Sabha constituency.

== Transportation ==
Local roads have access to National Highway No.66 which connects to Mangalore in the north and Calicut in the south. The nearest railway station is Manjeshwar on Mangalore-Palakkad line. There is an airport at Mangalore.
