= Angadimogaru =

- village
- Location in Kerala, India Angadimogaru (India)
- Coordinates: 12.6357300°N 75.0154700°E
- Country: India
- State: Kerala
- District: Kasaragod
- Taluk: Manjeshwaram

Population (2011)
  - Total: 4,954

Languages
  - Official: Malayalam, English
- Time zone: UTC+5:30 (IST)
- PIN: 671321
- Vehicle registration: KL-14

Angadimogar is a village in Kasaragod district in the state of Kerala, India, that is located 17.5 km from the city of Kasaragod. It is rich in arecanut and coconut trees.

== Demographics ==
As of 2011 census, Angadimogaru village had population of 4,954 where 2,397 are males and 2,557 are females. Average literacy of angadimogar village is 91.2 % lower than state average of 94 %. Male literacy is 94.9 % and Female literacy is 87.8 %.

== See also ==
- Perla, Kerala

Tucked in the northernmost corner of Kerala, approximately 17.5 kilometres from Kasaragod city, lies Angadimogar — a village so quietly rooted in its landscape that it rarely makes headlines, yet carries within its soil, stone, and geology a history stretching back hundreds of millions of years.

Surrounded by coconut palms and dense arecanut groves, this village sits at a confluence of cultures, languages, and civilizations that shaped the Malabar coast. To understand Angadimogar is to understand that northern Kerala is a land where the boundaries between states, languages, and dynasties have been more fluid than the map suggests.
