= Peral-Kannur =

Kannur
- Village
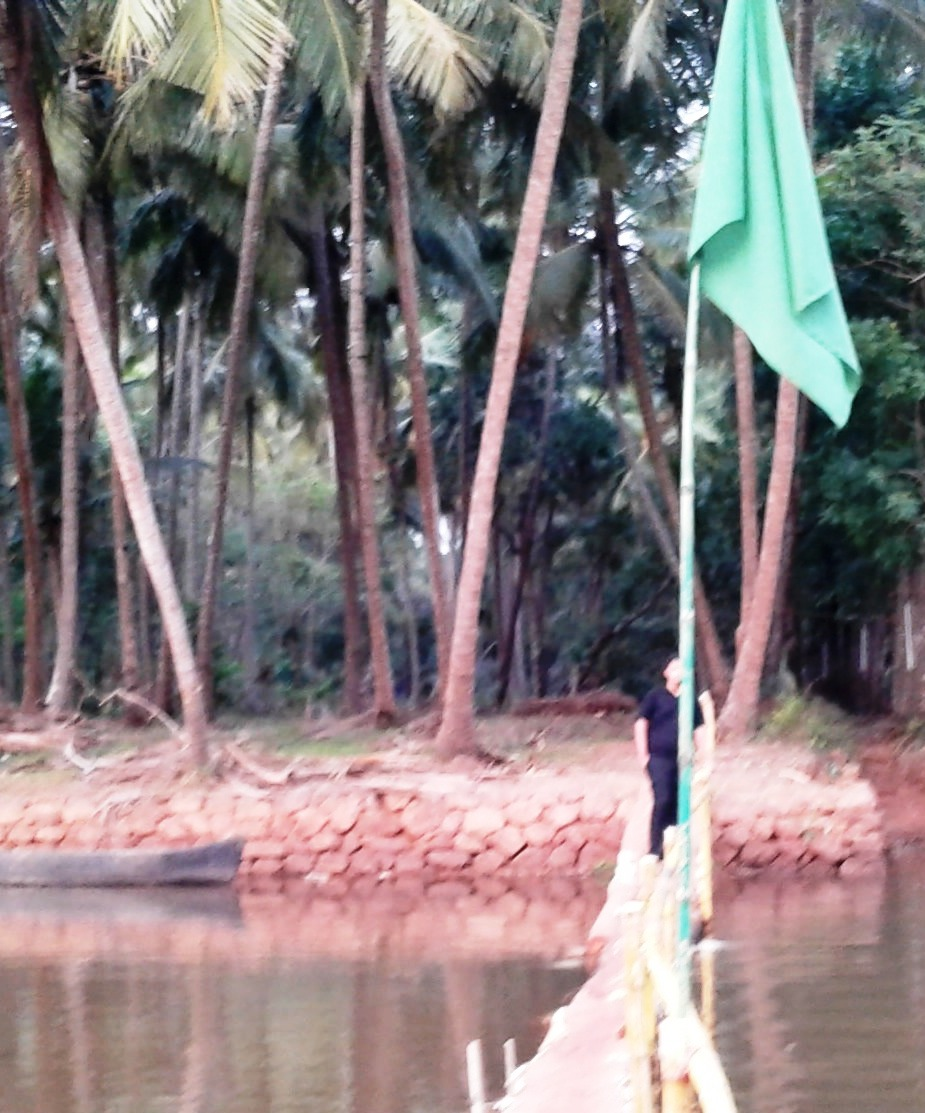
- The Kamuku bridge behind the Dargah

- Location in Kerala Kannur (India)
- Coordinates: 12.569968°N 74.980788°E
- Country: India
- State: Kerala
- District: Kasaragod
- Taluk: Manjeshwaram

Government
  - Body: Puthige Grama Panchayat
- Elevation: 20 m (66 ft)

Population
  - Total: 2,421

Languages
  - Official: Malayalam, English
- Time zone: UTC+5:30 (IST)
- PIN: 671321
- Telephone code: 91–4998
- ISO 3166 code: IN-KL
- Vehicle registration: KL-14

Kannur is a village located in the Puthige panchayath, in Kasaragod district of the Indian state of Kerala. Kannur is home to the Ananthapura Lake Temple (12.584209°N 74.981992°E), a Hindu temple located in the middle of a lake.

== Peral-Kannur and Kannur ==
Peral-Kannur is a small village under the administration of Puthige panchayath in Kasaragod district. Kannur is a city and headquarters of the Kannur district approximately 106 kilometres (66 mi) south.

== Demographics ==
As of 2011 Census, Kannur village had total population of 2,421 where 1,183 are males and 1,238 are females. Kannur village spreads over 6.86 km^{2} (2.65 sq mi) with 445 families residing in it. Population in the age group 0-6 was 284 among which 147 are males and 137 are females. Kannur had overall literacy of 90% where male literacy stands at 94.1% and female literacy was 86.1%.

== Landmarks ==
Peral-Kannur can be accessed from Madhur-Seethangoli road. The village school is located in this junction. The village Dargah and the watersfall can be accessed from this junction.

== Geography and climate ==
Kannur lies along the Konkan coast, a rugged section of the western coastline of India on the Laccadive Sea, and is bounded on the west by the Mogral River (12.569177°N 74.976759°E) and on the east by the KINFRA Industrial Park (12.574099°N 74.997412°E). The village has heavy rainfalls during the monsoons season. The coastal area of Kannur is very rich in natural resources including rainforests and backwaters. The village has a tropical climate, and summer and winter months experience similar temperate conditions, with average temperatures ranging from 24 to 33 °C (75 to 91 °F).

== Image gallery ==
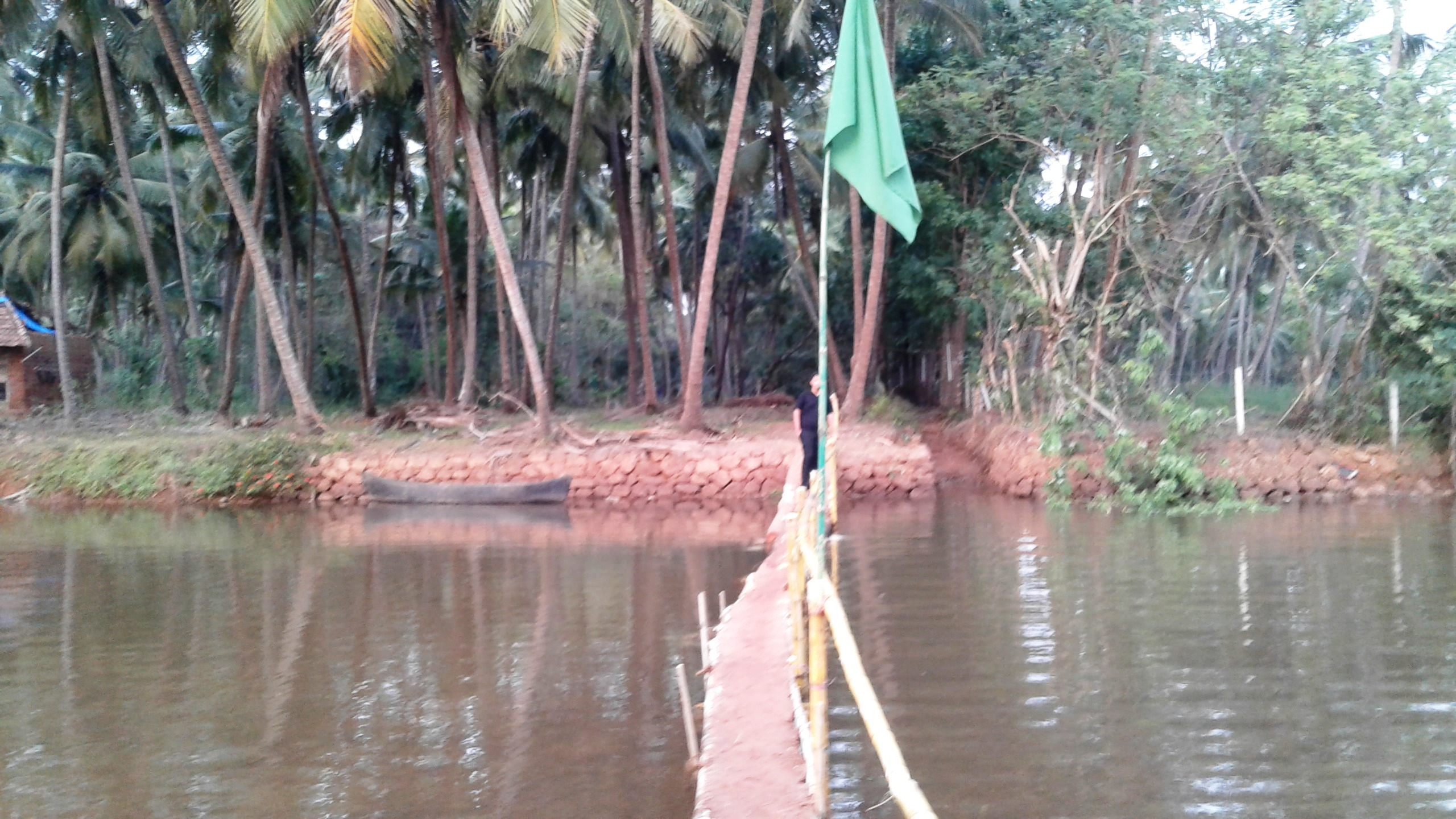
Kamuku bridge

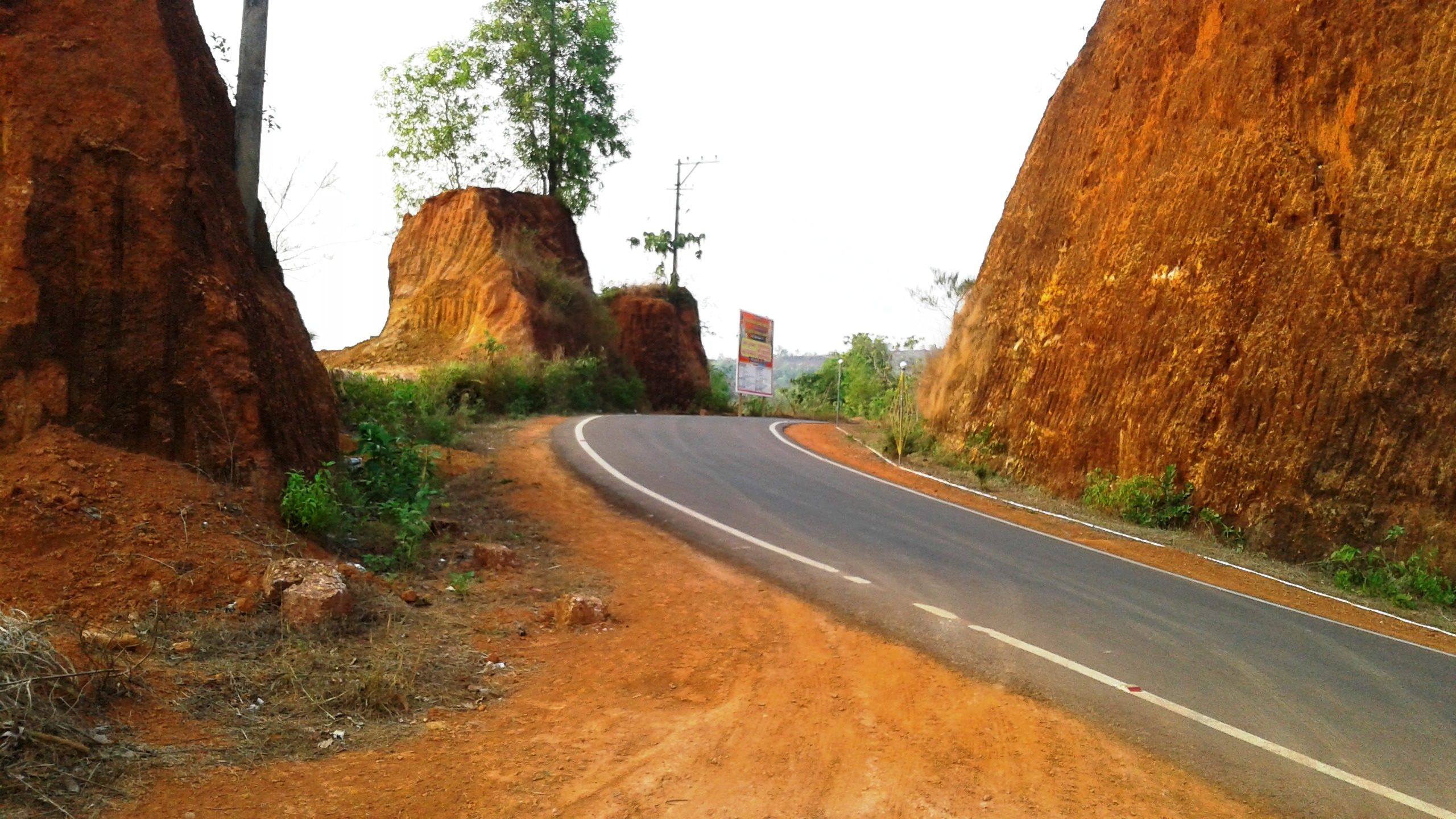
Lunar landscape

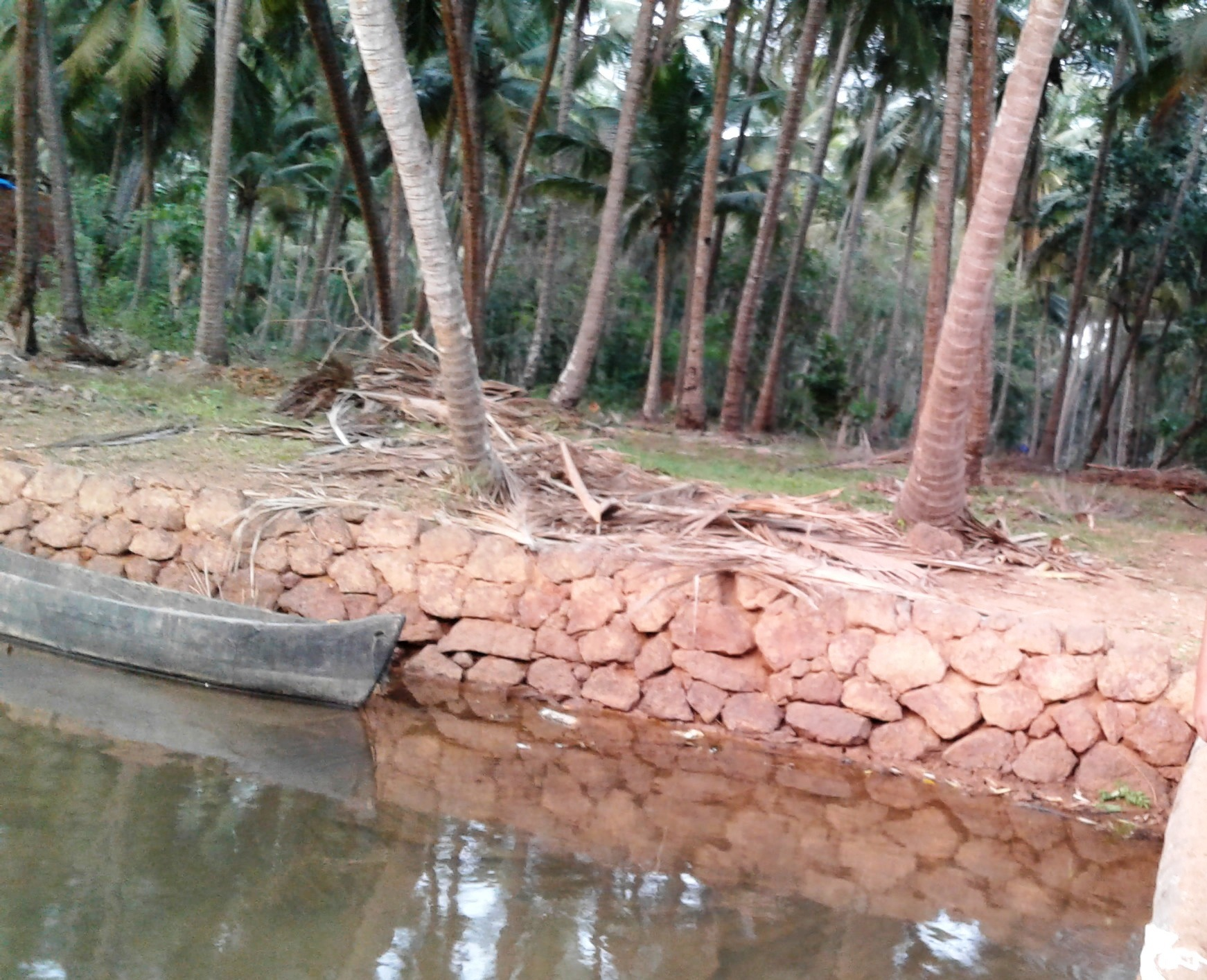
The 'thodi'

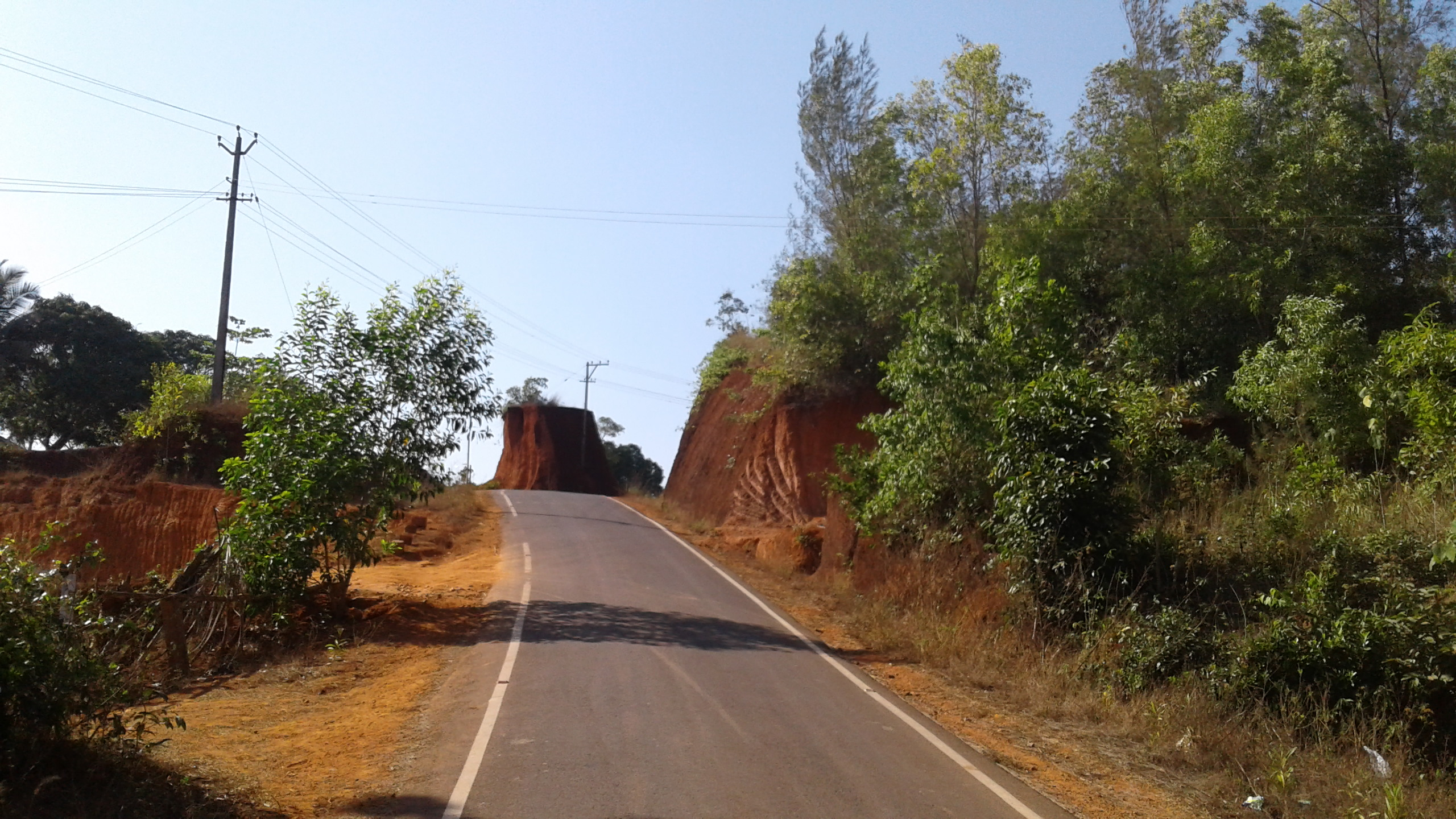
Sulthan Road
