= Beary =

Indian ethnic group

Bearys
Total population
- 950,000+

Regions with significant populations
- Tulunadu, Chikmagalur district, Kodagu, Hassan district, Uttara Kannada, Persian Gulf States

Languages
- Beary

Religion
- Islam

Related ethnic groups
- Nawayath, Mappilas, Labbay

The Beary (also known as Byari) are a Muslim community concentrated along the southwest coast of India.

The Beary community of Tulunadu is among the earliest Muslim inhabitants of India, with a clear history of more than 950 years.

== Etymology ==
The word Beary is said to be derived from the Tulu word Byara, which means trade or business. Since the major portion of the community was involved in business activities, particularly trading, the local Tulu-speaking majority called them as Beary or Byari.

A third theory says that the word Beary is derived from the root word Malabar. The Islamic Da'ee, Malik bin Deenar, had arrived on the coast of Malabar during the 7th century with a group of Da'ees, or Islamic propagators. A member from his group, Habeeb bin Malik travelled through Tulunadu and preached Islam. He had also built Mosques in Kasaragod, Mangalore and Barkur.

== Language ==
The language variety spoken by Beary community is traditionally known as Beary base (language). The Nawayath Muslims of Uttara Kannada speak a dialect of Konkani, and the Mappila Muslims of Kerala speak Malayalam (Mappila Malayalam). Beary dialect has grammatical similarities with other Malayalam dialects and great phonological influence from Tulu. Due to the trading role of the community, the dialect acquired loan words from other languages of Tulu, Kannada and also from Perso-Arabic sources. This language variety is traditionally recognized as a dialect of Malayalam because of the grammatical similarities with Old Malayalam. The dialect uses Malayalam and Kannada scripts for writing.

== World Beary Convention ==
In April 2006, The World Beary Convention was held in Dubai World Beary Sammelana & Chammana 2006. A similar event was held in 2010.

== Beary literature ==
The Beary Sahitya Academy is an association of Beary-speaking people located mainly in Tulu Nadu, which includes the coastal districts of Dakshina Kannada and Udupi in Karnataka state and Kasaragod in Kerala state. In 2022, the foundation-laying ceremony for the construction of a new building for Karnataka Beary Sahitya Academy at Thokkottu was held.

== Beary organisations ==
Karnataka Beary Sahithya Academy

With the establishment of Karnataka Beary Sahithya Academy, the language got formal recognition and academic status from the government of Karnataka. This led to a boom in Beary literary and cultural activities and a script was developed for the language in 2020.

The main motive of the Academy is to reckon the rich culture and heritage of Bearys and to cultivate and motivate the emerging young talents in the Beary community. By creating awareness of Beary culture, language and literature, the Academy aims to accomplish its goal in overall development of Beary language to build a healthy society.

In 2022, the foundation-laying ceremony for the construction of a new building for Karnataka Beary Sahitya Academy at Thokkottu was held.

=== Bearys Welfare Association ===
In 2010, the Bearys Welfare Association, based in Bengaluru, distributed 80 scholarships for the needy.

=== Bearys Welfare Forum ===
The Bearys Welfare Forum (BWF) of Abu Dhabi is an association of Beary expatriates in Abu Dhabi, United Arab Emirates. It was established in 2004 with an intention of working for all sections of the society. It has helped the victims of Communal riots in Mangalore by providing medical assistance and other aids. It The BWF has organised several mass marriage ceremonies in Mangalore.

== Other sources ==
- Bearys of the coast, Article in Deccan Herald 12 December 1997 by B.M. Hanif.
- Muslims in Dakshina Kannada: a historical study up to 1947 and survey of recent developments, Author Wahab Doddamane, A. Green Words publication. Mangalore, 1993.
