= Kudalmarkala =

- village
- Country: India
- State: Kerala
- District: Kasaragod

Population (2011)
  - Total: 7,081

Languages
  - Official: Malayalam, English
- Time zone: UTC+5:30 (IST)
- Vehicle registration: KL-14

Kudalmarkala is a village in Kasaragod district in the state of Kerala, India.

== Demographics ==
As of 2011 India census, Kudalmarkala had a population of 7081 with 3548 males and 3533 females.

== Transportation ==
Local roads have access to National Highway No.66 which connects to Mangalore in the north and Calicut in the south. The nearest railway station is Manjeshwar on Mangalore-Palakkad line. There is an airport at Mangalore.

== Languages ==
This locality is an essentially multi-lingual region. The people speak Malayalam, Kannada, Tulu, Beary bashe and Konkani. Migrant workers also speak Hindi and Tamil languages.

== Administration ==
This village is part of Manjeswaram assembly constituency which is again part of Kasaragod (Lok Sabha constituency)
