= Shiriya =

- Census Town
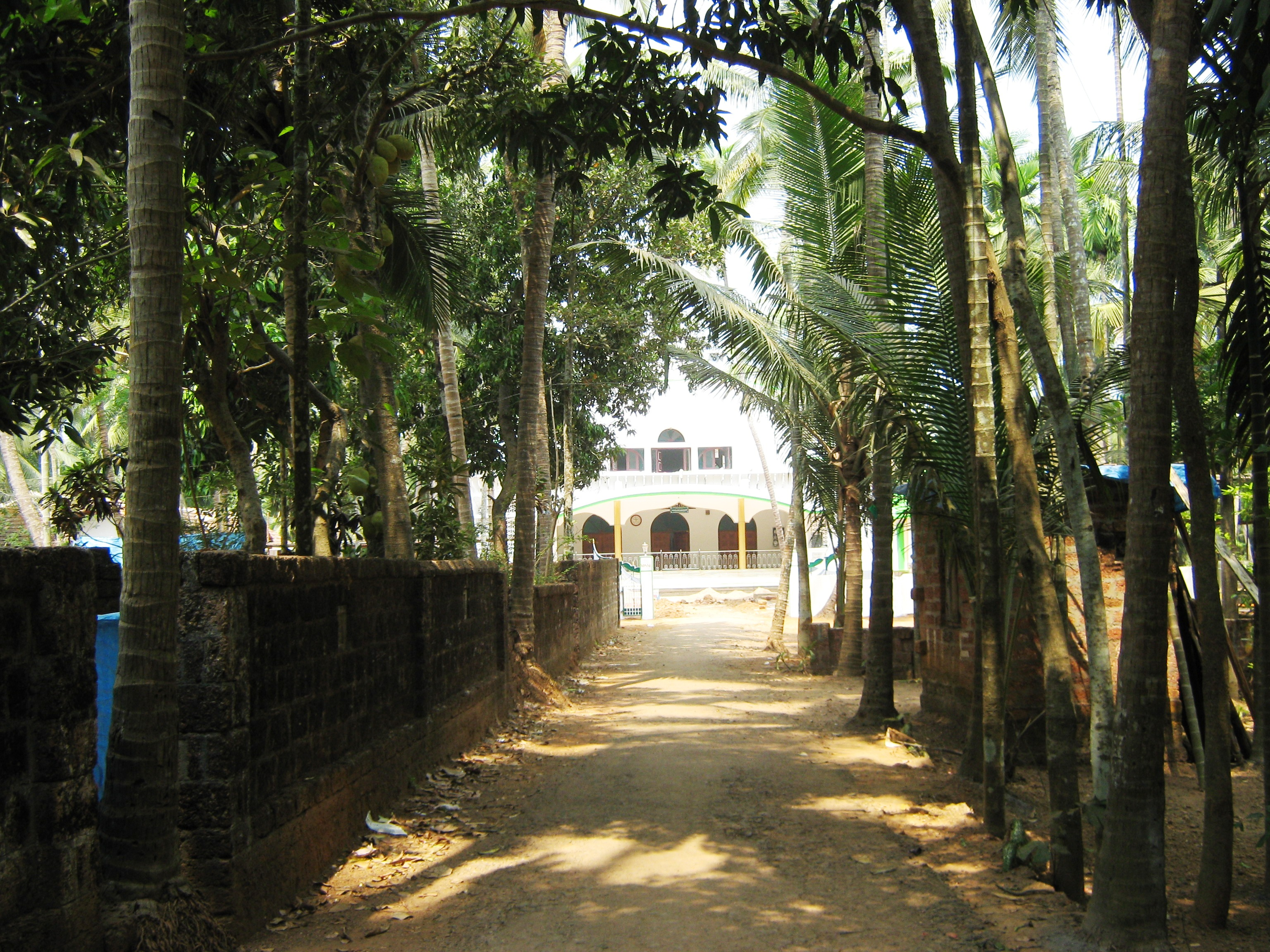

- Location in Kerala, India Shiriya (India)
- Coordinates: 12.6228°N 74.9282°E
- Country: India
- State: Kerala
- District: Kasaragod

Area
  - Total: 4.0 km^{2} (1.5 sq mi)

Population (2011)
  - Total: 5,277
  - Density: 1,300/km^{2} (3,400/sq mi)

Languages
  - Official: Malayalam, English
- Time zone: UTC+5:30 (IST)
- PIN: 671321
- Vehicle registration: KL-14
- Nearest city: Kasaragod
- RAS since 2016

Shiriya is a village in the Kasaragod district of Kerala, India. It comprises several smaller localities, namely Shiriya, Shiriya Kunnil, Muttam Gate, and Olayam.

== Geography ==
Shiriya is in Manjeshwaram Taluk which is the northernmost taluk in both Kasaragod district and the state of Kerala. The town is situated on the coast of the Lakshadweep Sea, at the mouth of the Shiriya River. A rail line and National Highway 66 pass through the town.

== Demographics ==
As per 2011 Census, Shiriya census town had a population of 5,277, where 2,403 are male and 2,874 are female. It covered an area of 400 hectares and had 974 households in that year. 818 people, roughly 15% of the town's population, were at or below the age of 6 in 2011. Although the two official languages of the region are Malayalam and English, people in Shiriya also speak Tulu, Beary, and Konkani. Migrant workers also speak Hindi language.

== Administration ==
Shiriya is within Manjeshwar State Assembly constituency, and Kasaragod Lok Sabha constituency.
