= Kodibail =

- village
- Location in Kerala, India Kodibail (India)
- Coordinates: 12°40′0″N 74°55′0″E
- Country: India
- State: Kerala
- District: Kasaragod
- Town: Uppala

Area
  - Total: 2.58 km^{2} (1.00 sq mi)

Population (2011)
  - Total: 3,614
  - Density: 1,400/km^{2} (3,630/sq mi)

language
  - Official: Malayalam
- Time zone: UTC+5:30 (IST)
- PIN: 671322
- Vehicle registration: KL-14

Kodibail is a village in Uppala town, Kasaragod district, Kerala, India. It is in the south west region of Uppala.

== Transportation ==
Local roads have access to National Highway No.66 which connects to Mangalore in the north and Calicut in the south. The nearest railway station is Manjeshwar on Mangalore-Palakkad line. There is an airport at Mangalore.

== Languages ==
This locality is an essentially multi-lingual region. The people speak Malayalam, Urdu and Tulu.

== Administration ==
This village is part of Manjeswaram assembly constituency which is again part of Kasaragod (Lok Sabha constituency)
