= Miyapadavu =

Village in Kerala State, India

Coordinates: 12.7145°N 74.9529°E

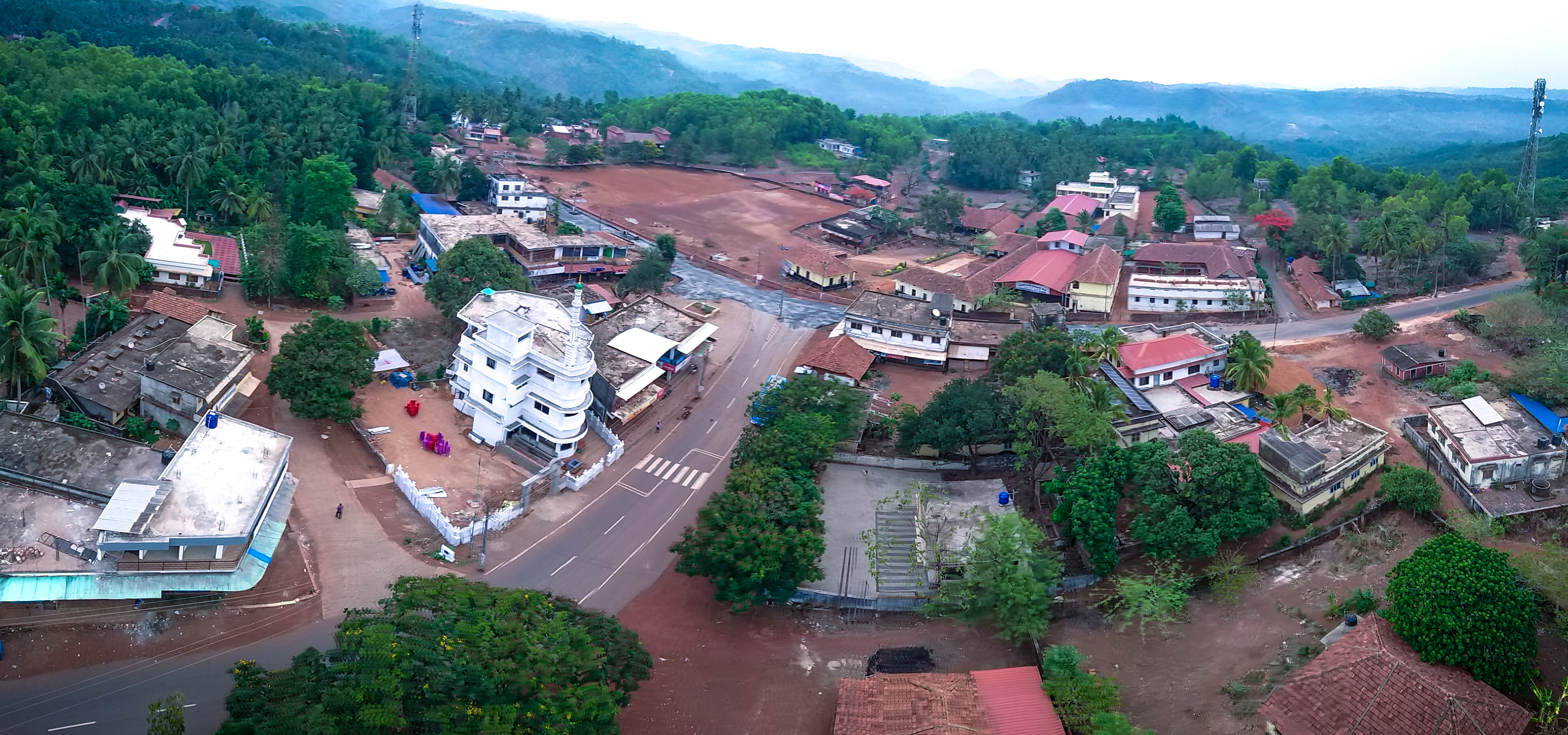

Miyapadavu is a small village of Meenja Panchayath of Manjeshwar taluk Kasaragod district, Kerala state, India.

== Location ==
Miyapadavu is located east of Hosangadi junction in Majeshwar. It is 7.5 kilometers away from Hosangadi junction.

== Transport ==
Miyapadavu can be accessed by bus from Uppala, Hosangadi/Manjeshwar towns.

== Image gallery ==
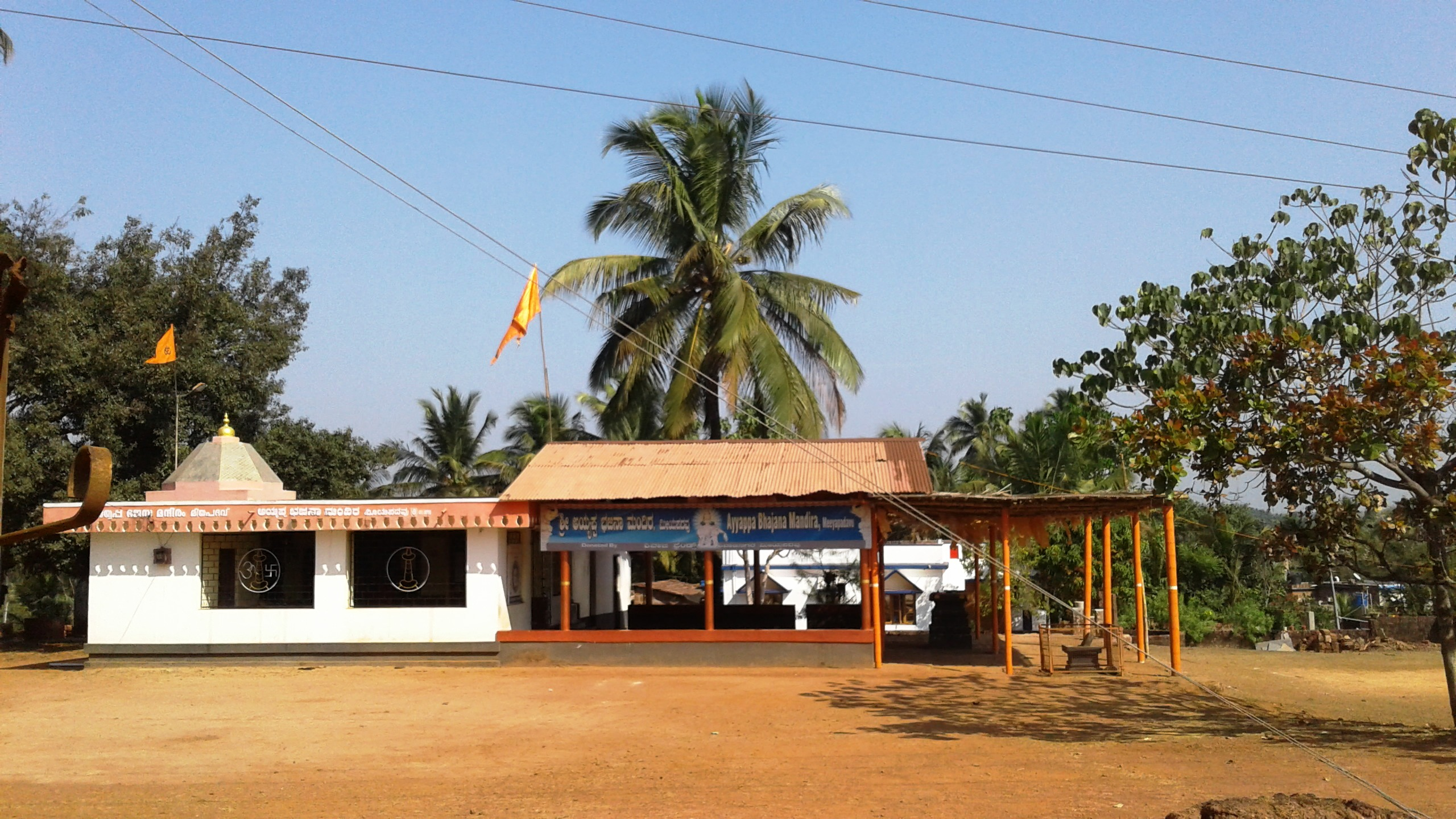
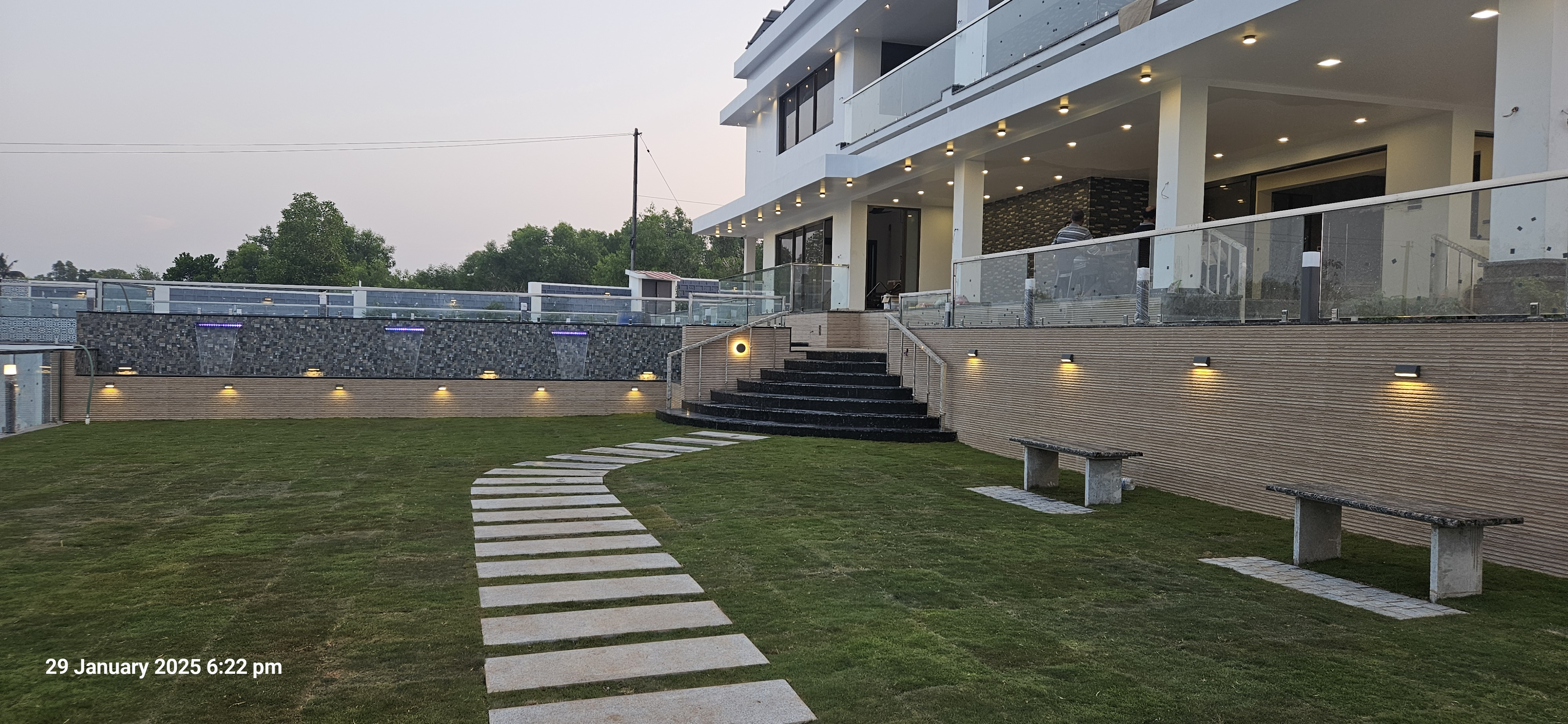
Rejuvenation amidst the valleys of North Kerala
Ayyappa Temple

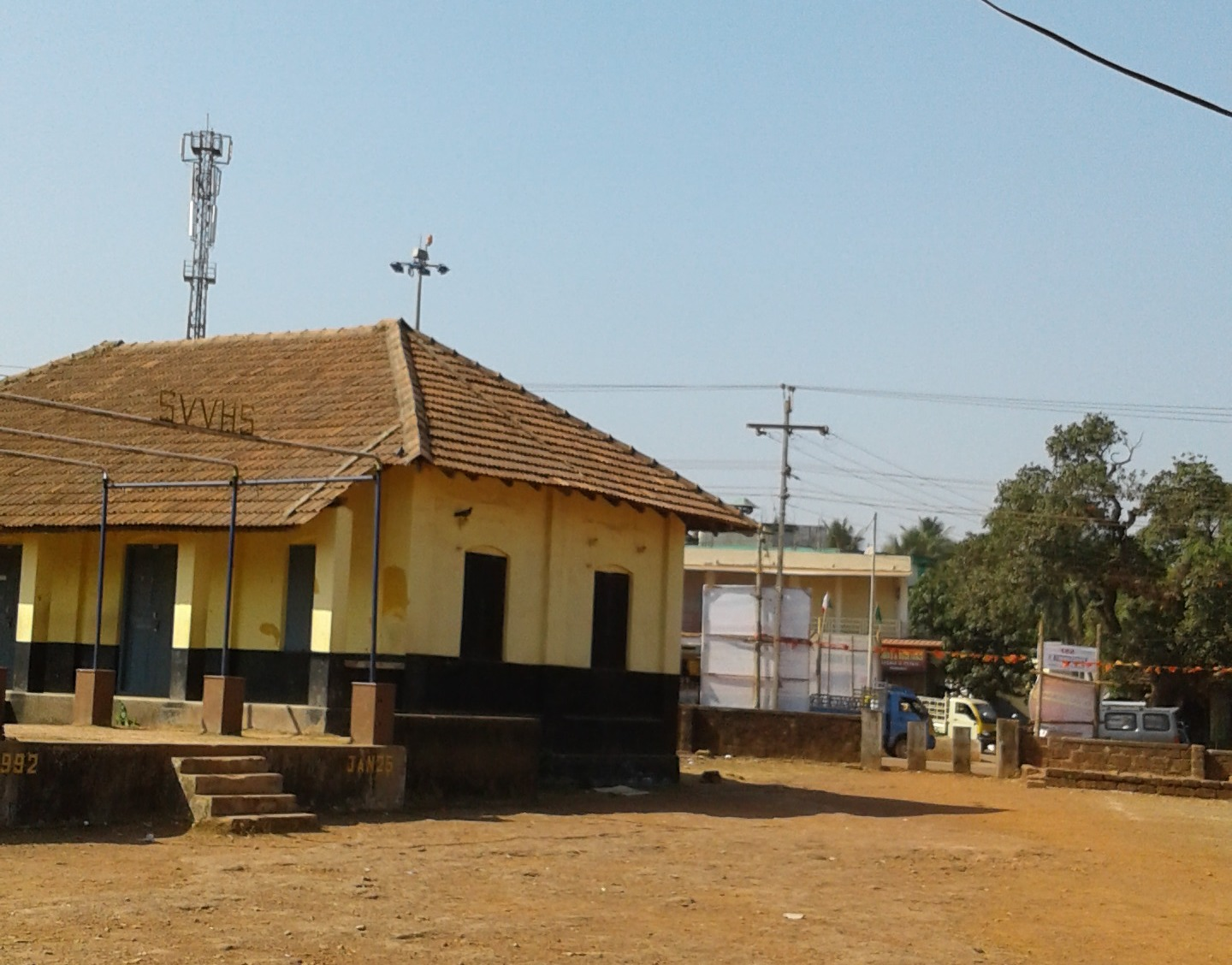
Primary School

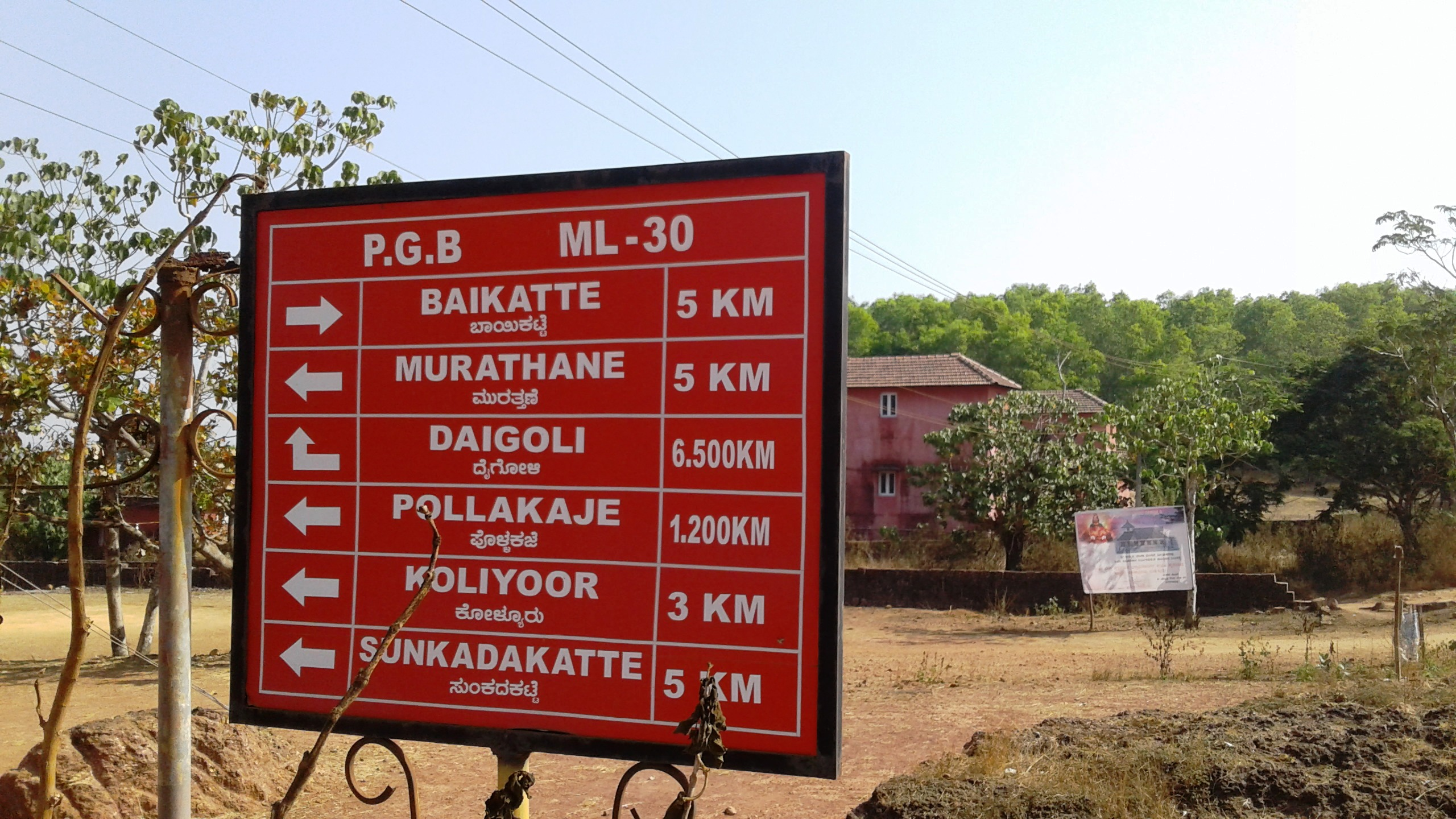
Miyapadavu Junction

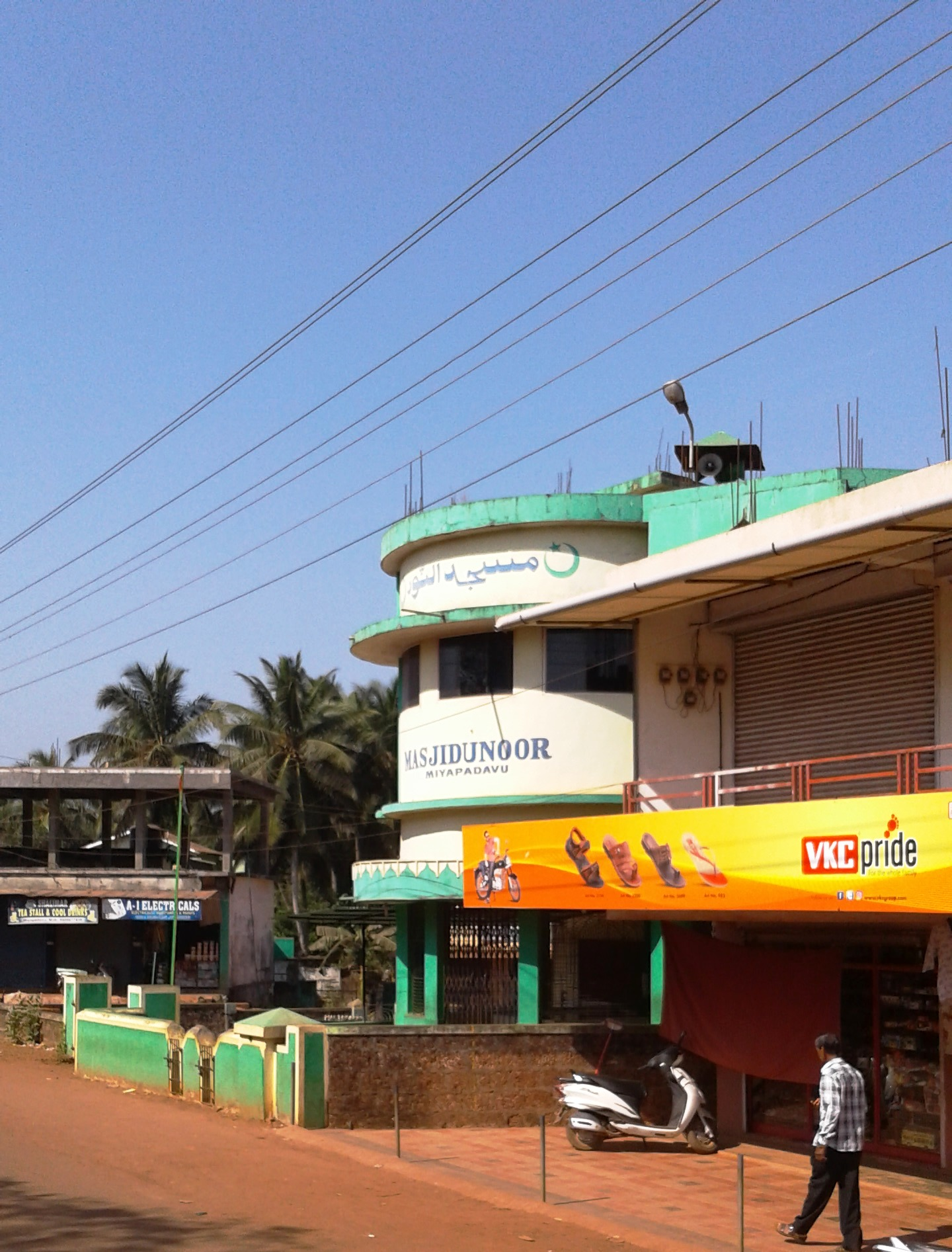
Noor Masjidh
