= Badoor =

- village
- Location in Kerala, India
- Coordinates: 12.632480°N 75.033460°E
- Country: India
- State: Kerala
- District: Kasaragod

Population (2011)
  - Total: 5,536

Languages
  - Official: Malayalam, English
- Time zone: UTC+5:30 (IST)
- Postal code: 671321
- Vehicle registration: KL-14

Badoor is a village in Kasaragod district in the state of Kerala, India.

== Demographics ==
As of 2011 India census, Badoor had a population of 5536 with 2684 males and 2852 females.

== See also ==
- Perla, Kasaragod
- Kattathadka
- Kumbla
