= Bangramanjeshwar =

- Census Town
- Location in Kerala, India Bangramanjeshwar (India)
- Coordinates: 12.719640°N 74.887100°E
- Country: India
- State: Kerala
- District: Kasaragod

Area
  - Total: 2.8 km^{2} (1.1 sq mi)

Population (2011)
  - Total: 5,791
  - Density: 2,100/km^{2} (5,400/sq mi)
- Time zone: UTC+5:30 (IST)
- PIN: 671323

Bangramanjeshwar (Bangramanjeshwaram) is a census town in Kasaragod district in the state of Kerala, India.

== Demographics ==
As of 2011 Census, Bangramanjeshwar town had a population of 5,791 where 2,841 are males and 2,950 are females. Population in the age group below 6 years was 12%. Bangramanjeshwar census town has an area of 2.8 km^{2} (1.1 sq mi) with 1,041 families residing in it. Average literacy rate of Bangramanjeshwar was 92% lower than state average of 94%: male literacy was 96.5% and female literacy was 87.7%.

== Religions ==
As per 2011 census report, Bangramanjeshwar town has total population of 5,791 among which 3,490 are Muslims (60.3%), 2,238 are Hindus (38.6%), 29 Christians (0.5%), 20 Jains (0.3%), 4 Sikhs and 10 people not stated their religion.

== Administration ==
This village is part of Manjeshwaram assembly constituency which is again part of Kasaragod (Lok Sabha constituency).
