= Kattathadka =

- Village
- Location in Kerala, India
- Coordinates: 12.6158°N 75.0066°E
- Country: India
- State: Kerala
- District: Kasaragod

Government
  - Body: Puthige Grama Panchayat

Languages
  - Official: Malayalam, English
- Time zone: UTC+5:30 (IST)
- PIN: 671321
- Telephone code: 04998
- Vehicle registration: KL14
- Nearest city: Kasaragod

Kattathadka is a small town in Puthige Grama Panchayat in Kasaragod district, Kerala, India. It is located in Perla-Kumbla road near to Seethangoli, Kasaragod.
