= List of taluks of Kerala =

List of administrative divisions of Kerala, India

In Kerala, the administrative divisions below the district are called taluks. There are 78 taluks with 1670 villages (including group villages).

For revenue administration, a district subdivided into revenue divisions, each comprising multiple taluks within its jurisdiction. A taluk contain several revenue villages under its jurisdiction. Each taluk has a taluk office headed by a Tehsildar, who also serves as the executive magistrate of that taluk.

Kerala administrative divisions; Map based on 2020

Taluks in Kerala

No	Name of the Taluk	Name of the District	No. of villages	RTO Code	Area (in sq.km)
1	Neyyattinkara	Thiruvananthapuram	21	KL-19, KL-20	
2	Kattakkada	Thiruvananthapuram	13	KL-74	
3	Nedumangad	Thiruvananthapuram	25	KL-21	
4	Thiruvananthapuram	Thiruvananthapuram	31	KL-01, KL-15, KL-22	
5	Chirayinkeezhu (HO: Attingal)	Thiruvananthapuram	17	KL-16	
6	Varkala	Thiruvananthapuram	12	KL-81	
7	Kollam	Kollam	31	KL-02	
8	Kunnathoor (HO: Sasthamcotta)	Kollam	07	KL-61	
9	Karunagappally	Kollam	17	KL-23	
10	Kottarakkara	Kollam	27	KL-24, KL-82	
11	Punalur	Kollam	15	KL-25	
12	Pathanapuram	Kollam	08	KL-80	
13	Adoor	Pathanamthitta	14	KL-26	
14	Konni	Pathanamthitta	14	KL-83	
15	Kozhencherry (HO: Pathanamthitta)	Pathanamthitta	11	KL-03	
16	Ranni	Pathanamthitta	10	KL-62	1004.6
17	Mallappally	Pathanamthitta	09	KL-28	
18	Thiruvalla	Pathanamthitta	12	KL-27	
19	Chenganoor	Alappuzha	11	KL-30	
20	Mavelikkara	Alappuzha	15	KL-31	
21	Karthikappally (HO: Haripad)	Alappuzha	18	KL-29	
22	Kuttanad (HO: Mankombu)	Alappuzha	14	KL-66	
23	Ambalappuzha (HO: Alappuzha)	Alappuzha	13	KL-04	
24	Cherthala	Alappuzha	20	KL-32	
25	Changanasserry	Kottayam	15	KL-33	
26	Kottayam	Kottayam	26	KL-05	
27	Vaikom	Kottayam	18	KL-36, KL-67	
28	Meenachil (HO: Palai)	Kottayam	28	KL-35, KL-67	
29	Kanjirappally	Kottayam	13	KL-34	
30	Peermade	Idukki	10	KL-37	
31	Udumbanchola (HO: Nedumkandam)	Idukki	18	KL-69	
32	Idukki (HO: Painavu)	Idukki	9	KL-06	
33	Thodupuzha	Idukki	17	KL-38	
34	Devikulam	Idukki	13	KL-68	
35	Kothamangalam	Ernakulam	12	KL-44	
36	Muvattupuzha	Ernakulam	18	KL-17	
37	Kunnathunad (HO: Perumbavoor)	Ernakulam	23	KL-40, KL-17	
38	Kanayannur (HO: Eranakulam)	Ernakulam	20	KL-07, KL-39	
39	Kochi (HO: Fort Kochi)	Ernakulam	15	KL-43, KL-42	
40	North Paravur	Ernakulam	13	KL-42	
41	Aluva	Ernakulam	16	KL-41, KL-63	
42	Chalakudy	Thrissur	31	KL-64, KL-45	
43	Mukundapuram (HO: Irinjalakuda)	Thrissur	29	KL-45	
44	Kodungallur	Thrissur	12	KL-47	
45	Thrissur	Thrissur	41	KL-08	
46	Chavakkad	Thrissur	17	KL-46, KL-75	
47	Kunnamkulam	Thrissur	14	KL-46, KL-48	
48	Thalapilly (HO: Wadakkancheri)	Thrissur	22	KL-48	
49	Alathoor	Palakkad	30	KL-49	
50	Chittur	Palakkad	30	KL-70	
51	Palakkad	Palakkad	30	KL-09	
52	Pattambi	Palakkad	18	KL-52	
53	Ottappalam	Palakkad	41	KL-51	
54	Mannarkkad	Palakkad	19	KL-50	
55	Attappady (HO: Agali)	Palakkad	6	KL-50	
56	Perinthalmanna	Malappuram	24	KL-53	
57	Nilambur	Malappuram	19	KL-71	
58	Eranad (HO: Manjeri)	Malappuram	23	KL-10	
59	Kondotty	Malappuram	12	KL-84	
60	Ponnani	Malappuram	11	KL-54	
61	Tirur	Malappuram	30	KL-55	
62	Tirurangadi	Malappuram	17	KL-65	
63	Kozhikode	Kozhikode	25	KL-11, KL-76, KL-85	
64	Thamarassery	Kozhikode	20	KL-57, KL-76	
65	Koyilandy	Kozhikode	34	KL-56, KL-77	
66	Vatakara	Kozhikode	28	KL-18, KL-77	
67	Vythiri (HO: Kalpetta)	Wayanad	18	KL-12	
68	Sulthan Bathery	Wayanad	15	KL-73	
69	Mananthavady	Wayanad	16	KL-72	
70	Thalassery	Kannur	34	KL-58	
71	Iritty	Kannur	20	KL-78	
72	Kannur	Kannur	28	KL-13	
73	Taliparamba	Kannur	28	KL-59	
74	Payyanur	Kannur	22	KL-86	
75	Hosdurg (HO: Kanhangad)	Kasaragod	31	KL-60	
76	Vellarikund	Kasaragod	15	KL-79	
77	Kasaragod	Kasaragod	34	KL-14	
78	Manjeshwaram (HO: Uppala)	Kasaragod	48	KL-14	

== See also ==
- List of revenue divisions of Kerala
- Districts of Kerala
