= Manjeshwar railway station =

Railway station in Kerala, India

Manjeshwar

General information
- Location: India
- Coordinates: 12.7249°N 74.8875°E
- System: Regional rail and Light rail station
- Platforms: 3
- Tracks: 4

Other information
- Status: Functioning
- Station code: MJS
- Zone(s): Southern Railway zone
- Division(s): Palakkad
Route map
- Sources
Location
- Location within India Location within Kerala

Manjeshwar Railway Station (station code: MJS) is an NSG–6 category Indian railway station in Palakkad railway division of Southern Railway zone. It is a major railway station serving the town of Manjeshwar in the Kasaragod District of Kerala, India. It lies in the Shoranur–Mangalore section of the Southern Railways.

This is the northern most railway station of Kerala. It's situated 4 km south of state's border with Karnataka.

The station has three platforms and four tracks. Trains halting at the station connect the town to prominent cities in India such as Thiruvananthapuram, Kochi, Chennai, Kollam, Bangalore, Kozhikode, Coimbatore, Mangalore etc.
