= Byari dialect =

Malayalam dialect spoken by the Byari people

Byari
- Beary
- ബ്യാരി, ಬ್ಯಾರಿ
- Pronunciation: IPA: [bjaːɾi]
- Native to: India
- Region: Tulu Nadu
- Ethnicity: Byari
- Native speakers: 1,500,000
- Language family: Dravidian: Southern; Southern I; Tamil–Kannada; Tamil–Kota; Tamil–Toda; Tamil–Irula; Tamil–Kodava–Urali; Tamil–Malayalam; Malayalam; Byari

Official status
- Regulated by: Karnataka Beary Sahitya Academy

Language codes
- ISO 639-3: –

External videos
- A Byari speaker speaking Byari

Byari or Beary (ബ്യാരി, ಬ್ಯಾರಿ IPA: [bjaːɾi]) is a geographically isolated dialect of Malayalam spoken predominantly by the Byari Muslim community in the Tulu Nadu region of Karnataka, particularly in Dakshina Kannada and Udupi districts. It is also spoken in parts of coastal and western Karnataka outside Tulu Nadu, including central coastal Karnataka, western Malenadu, and Kodagu. The community is often recognized as Beary or Byari Muslims. Beary dialect has some influences of Tulu phonology and grammar. Due to the trading role of the community, the dialect acquired loan words from other languages of Persian and Arabic sources..

== Etymology ==
See Beary#Etymology.

== Features ==
The dialect generally uses the Malayalam and Kannada alphabets for writing. In 2007, the state government established the Karnataka Beary Sahitya Academy for the preservation and promotion of the Beary literature and culture. Being a distant cousin of other dialects of Malayalam and surrounded by other linguistic groups for centuries, mainly Tulu, the dialect exhibits ancient features as well as modern innovations not seen in other well-known dialects of Malayalam. Surrounded by Tulu-speaking populations, the impact of Tulu on the phonological, morphological and syntactic structure of the dialect is evident.

=== Distinction of ḻ, ṇ, ṟ ===
Sounds peculiar to Standard Malayalam such as 'ḻ', 'ṇ', 'ṟ' are not found in this dialect. 'ḷ' and 'ṇ' are merged with l and n, respectively. 'ṟ' is merged with r and tt, 'tt' to t. This resembles Tulu.

Byari	Kannada	Standard Malayalam	English
sante	sante	canta	'market'
ēni	ēṇi	ēṇi	'ladder'
puli	huḷi	puḷi	'tamarind'
kāt	gāḷi	kāṯṯu	'wind'
cor	anna	cor	'rice'

=== v > b ===
The initial v of standard Malayalam corresponds to an initial b in Byari. The same change has taken place in Tulu, too.

Byari	Standard Malayalam	Tulu	Kannada	English
bēli	vēli	bēli	bēli	'fence'
bitt	vittu	bitte	bitta ^{1}	'seed'
bādige	vāṭaka ^{2}	bādai	bādege	'rent'

1. Some dialects.
2. This orthographic representation is phonemic. On a phonetic level, it often becomes [ˈʋaːɖəɡə], which is closer to the Tulu and Byari forms. This occurs because of a rule whereby voiced plosive consonants are intervocalic allophones of their unvoiced counterparts. However, this only applies to native Dravidian words, and as vāṭaka is a Sanskrit loanword, the prescriptively correct pronunciation is indeed [ˈʋaːʈəkə].

=== Distinction of 'a' and 'e' ===
The final 'a' of standard Malayalam corresponds to the final 'e' in Byari.

Byari	Kannada	Standard Malayalam	English
āme	āme	āma	'tortoise'
cēre	kere	cēra	'rat snake'
mūle	mūle	mūla	corner

=== Distinction of 'n' and 'm' ===
The word final 'n' and 'm' of standard Malayalam are dropped in Byari.

Byari	Standard Malayalam	Kannada	English
ādya	ādyam	(modalu)	'first'
kalla	kaḷḷan	kaḷḷa	'thief'
cattae	kuppāyam(catta)	(batte)	'cloth'

=== Degeminated consonants ===
Geminated consonants occurring after a long vowel and also after a second short vowel of a word in standard Malayalam get degeminated in Byari.

Byari	Standard Malayalam	Tulu	English
pūce	pūcca	pucce	'cat'

=== Lexical relations ===
Almost all lexical items in Byari dialect can be related to corresponding lexical items in other Malayalam varieties, Tulu or Perso-Arabic origin. However, some equivalents can only be found in Mappila dialects of Malayalam in Kerala.

== Person endings ==
Verbs in old Dravidian languages did not have any person marking. Person endings of verbs observed in modern Dravidian languages are later innovations. Malayalam is the only Dravidian language that does not show any verbal person suffixes, so Malayalam verbs can be said to represent the original stage of Dravidian verbs (though Old Malayalam did have verbal person suffixes at some point). Person suffixes in Byari closely resemble those of Tulu, although the past tense in this dialect agrees with that of standard Malayalam in shape as well as in the distribution of allomorphs.

== Arabic influence ==
Byari has a strong lexical influence of the Arabic language. Nativised Arabic words are very common in everyday speech, especially in coastal areas. Byari also has words related to Tamil. Tamil and Standard Malayalam Speakers can understand Byari dialect upto a great extent.

Byari	Arabic	English
saan	ṣaḥn صحن	Plate
pinjhana	finjān فنجان	Bowl/cup
kayeen	nikāḥ نكاح	Nuptials
Seithaan	Šayṭān شيطان	Evil spirit
patthre	faṭīra فطيرة	Bread
Kalbu	qalb قلب	Heart
Rabbu	rabb رب	God
Supra	sufra سفرة	Dining Mat
Kubboosu	ḵubz خبز	Bread

== Byari dialect films ==
The first Byari-dialect feature film Byari shared the award for the best feature film at the 59th Indian National Film Awards.

== See also ==
- Arabi Malayalam
- Mygurudu, a Malyalam based secret-language from Malabar Muslims of Northern Kerala

== Bibliography ==
- Upadhyaya, U. Padmanabha, ed. (1996). Coastal Karnataka: studies in folkloristic and linguistic traditions of Dakshina Kannada Region of the western coast of India. Udupi: Ku. Shi. Abhinandana Samiti, Rashtrakavi Govind Pai Samshodhana Kendra. ISBN 978-81-86668-06-1.
