= Kanila Shree Bhagavathi Temple =

Hindu temple in Kerala, India

- Kanila Shree Bhagavathi Temple, Manjeshwar, Kasaragod, Kerala

Religion
- Affiliation: Hinduism
- District: Kasaragod
- Deity: Bhagavati

Location
- Location: Manjeshwar
- State: Kerala
- Country: India
- Interactive map of Kanila Shree Bhagavathi Temple
- Coordinates: 12.712611°N 74.901171°E

Architecture
- Type: Architecture of Kerala

Specifications
- Temple: One
- Elevation: 57.53 m (189 ft)

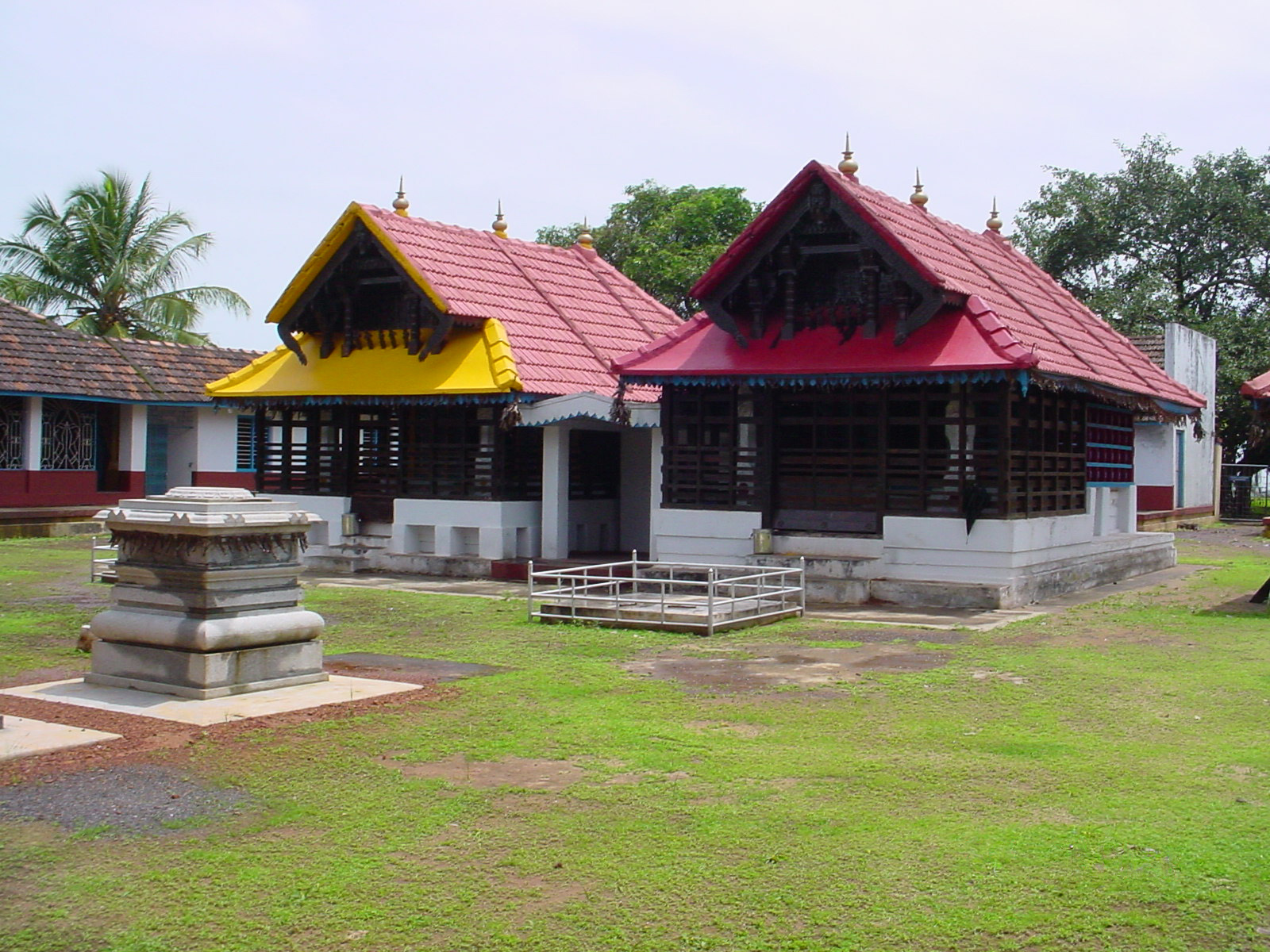
Kanila Shree Bhagavathi Temple

Kanila Shree Bhagavathi Temple (Also known as Kanila Shree Bhagavithi Kshetra) is a Hindu Temple of Devi Baghavathi, located on the west side of National Highway 17, approximately 1 km (0.62 mi) north of Hosangadi Junction of Manjeshwaram of Kerala state in India.

== Kanila Shree Bhagavathi Kalabhavana ==
Kanila Shree Bhagavathi Kalabhavana

Kanila Shree Bhagavathi Kalabhavana (Kalabhavana in kannada language means Hall for Arts & Cultural activities) is located on the north side of the temple. This hall is administered by the Shree Kanila Bhagavathi Temple committee. This hall is available on request for promoting arts & cultural activities, wedding events/receptions, and other committee approved meeting or party events.

== Kanila Shree Bhagavathi English Medium School ==
Kanila Shree Bhagavathi English Medium School

Kanila Shree Bhagavathi English medium School is a private school located on the south side of the temple. This school is serving good quality educations.

== See also ==
- Manjeshwaram
- Kasaragod
- Ezhava/Thiya community
- Billava Community
- Temples of Kerala

The school also provides quality and cultural activities to the local students of Manjeshwaram. Shri . B M Umesh is the President of the Kanila Bhagavathi Temple, The secretary is Mr. Gangadhar B.M, and the treasurer is Mr. Padmanabha Kadapara.
