= Karopady =

- Village
- Location in Karnataka, India Karopady (India)
- Coordinates: 12.7405°N 75.0210°E
- Country: India
- State: Karnataka
- District: Dakshina Kannada

Languages
  - Official: Kannada
- Time zone: UTC+5:30 (IST)
- PIN: 574279
- Telephone code: 08255
- Vehicle registration: KA19, KA21 AND KA70
- Nearest city: Mangalore, Puttur
- Lok Sabha constituency: Mangalore (Dakshina Kannada)
- Vidhan Sabha constituency: Bantwal

Karopady is a small village in Dakshina Kannada district, Karnataka, in far southern India. It is the border village between Karnataka and Kerala. Kasaragod District is the neighbouring district in Kerala State.

Karopady is situated between Anekallu and Kanyana. Kukkaje, Mambady, Aneyala, Gundamajalu, Kattatharu, Maindamoole, Palige, Mithanadka, Pambathaje, Padyana, Palige, Kandelu, Gubbya, Bamblimar, Althadka, Kabbinamoole, Bengadapadpu, Pattla and Kaimar are some of the small places within Karopady. The place called Anekallu belongs to the Karopady and Vorkady panchayath of Kasargod. The river called Anekallu river has divided Karopady from Vorkady kodlamugaru panchayath, situated in the north part of Kerala State. Kudpalthadka is one of the important place in Karopady because of education and hospital facilities provided by st lawrence church Kudpalthadka.

There are several ways to reach Karopady village. From Mangalore, a bus connects to Uppala, and then another bus travelling to Vittal or Puttur, and down at Nellikatte. Another bus from Mangalore, or Puttur, to Vittal, then connects to a direct bus to Mittanadka or a bus from Vittal to Uppala (the alias name is "Kurchipalla") or Bedagudde, and down at Nellikatte. There are direct buses from Mangalore and Manjeshwar to Kudpalthadka.

== Industries ==
Beedi-leaf rolling is the major industry which can be seen in Karopady.

Small scale industries like araca-nut-leaf plate-making industries, or homemade foods, have been growing in recent times.

The organisation called Sri Gurudev Public Charitable Trust has been working for the development of this area and has provided an opportunity for the needy in providing self-employment in this area.

File manufacturing industry (Tushar Industry) was started by Mr. Hariprasad, at Kanyana.

== Agriculture ==
Agriculture is the main occupation of the people in Karopady. One can see picturesque paddy fields throughout the area. Areca nut, coconuts, bananas, peppers, and cocoa are grown on a large scale in Karopady.

Advanced techniques are utilised by the agriculturists of this area.

== Language ==
There are people speaking in various mixed languages in Karopady. Havyaka, Tulu, Kannada, Konkani and Beary are some of the commonly spoken languages in the Karopady village. Havyaka Brahmins speak old Kannada called Havyaka Kannada, or Haveeka language. These languages are found in the area of Dakshina Kannada and parts of Udupi Districts.

== Banks and financial institutions ==
- Syndicate Bank, Kanyana
- Odiyoor Shree Vividoddesha Sowaharda Sahakari Limited Odiyoor head office & Kanyana Branch
- Karopady Co-op Agricultural Bank Ltd at Mithanadka, Bedagudda and Kanyana
- Vittal Grameena Sahakari Bank Ltd, Branch Kanyana
- KMF branches at Kudpalthadka, Mithanadka
- Samadka Badriya Juma MAsjid, samadka karopady.
- Shree Odiyoor Gurudevadatta Samsthanam
- St Lawrence Church Kudpalthadka
- Kudpolthai Deivastanam Kudpalthadka
- Shree Padyana Mahalingeshwara Temple
- Dhoomavathi Daivasthana Padyana
- Kallurti Daivasthana Padyana
- Shree Navadurga Sri Lakshmi Janardhana Temple Pambattaje
- Shree Rama Bajana Mandhira, Palladakody
- Shree Rajarajeshwari Mandira Bedagudda
- Bharathi Bhajana Mandira, Kudpalthadka
- Betha Sri Durgaparameshwari Ammanavara Gudi
- Rakteshwari and Guliga Daivasthana Anekallu, Malar Road
- Sri Umamaheshwara Matta Kodla, Karopady
- Mitthanadka Malaraya Boothastana
- Karopady Juma Masjid
- Shree Vagenadu Subraya Temple
- Shree Korathi Katte Kalai
- Shree Jaladurgaparameshwari Temple, Anekallu, Padpu
- St Lawrence Church Vijayadka
- Sirajul Huda Madarasa Padi
- munavvirul Islam madrasa Gundamajalu
- SSF Gundamajalu unit office Gumdamajalu

== Institutions ==
- Shree Gurudeva Public Charitable Trust
- Shree Gurudeva Gurukula
- Shree Gurudeva Primary & High School
- Shree Gurudeva ITI COllege
- Dakshina Kannada District Zilla Panchayat lower Primary School Padyana
- St. Lawrence primary school Vijayadka
- St. Lawrence higher primary school
- St. Lawrence English medium school Kudpalthadka
- Dakshina Kannada District Zilla Panchayat Higher Primary School Pambattaje
