= Thalapady =

Thalapady can refer to

- Thalappady, Kasaragod, Kerala
- Talapady, Mangalore, Karnataka
