= Mavilakadappuram =

- Village
- Country: India
- State: Kerala
- District: Kasaragod

Languages
  - Official: Malayalam, English
- Time zone: UTC+5:30 (IST)
- PIN: 671344

Mavilakadappuram is a small island village near Cheruvathur in Kasaragod district, Kerala, India.

== Transportation ==
Local roads have access to NH.11 which connects to Mangalore in the north and Calicut in the south. The nearest railway station is Cheruvathur on Mangalore-Palakkad line. There are airports at Mangalore and Calicut.
