= Seethangoli =

- Village
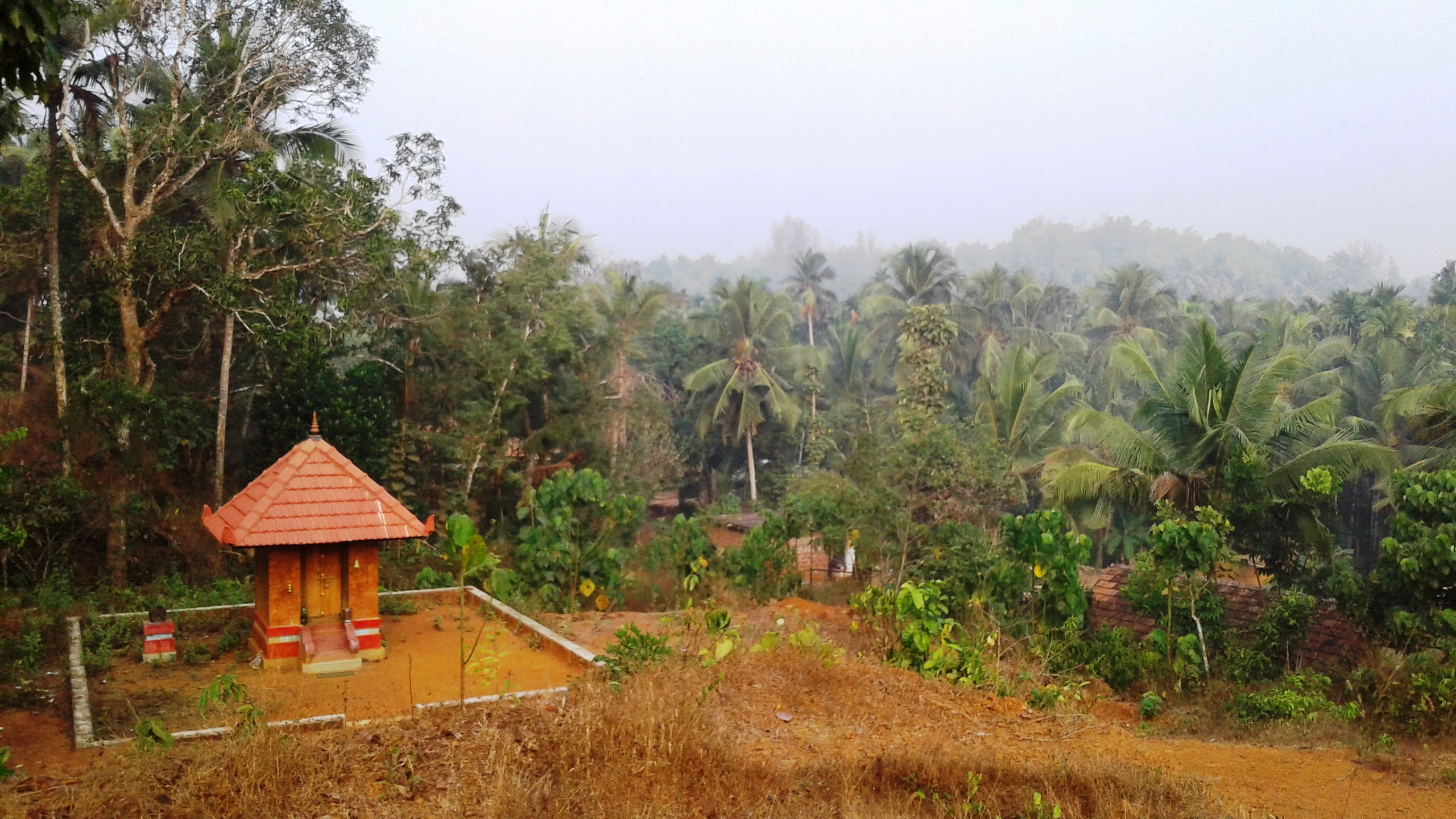
- Dabbarkatta Temple

- Location within Kerala Location within India
- Coordinates: 12.5888°N 75.0021°E
- Country: India
- State: Kerala
- District: Kasaragod

Government
  - Body: Panchayat

Languages
  - Official: Malayalam
- Time zone: UTC+5:30 (IST)
- PIN: 671321
- Telephone code: 4998
- Vehicle registration: KL-14
- Nearest city: Mangaluru
- Lok Sabha constituency: Kasaragod
- Civic agency: Panchayat

Seethangoli is a small village located 11 km north of Kasaragod town and 18 km south of Uppala in Kasaragod District, Kerala, India.

== History ==
The village of Seethangoli is in the shape of a finger ring. According to local traditions, when the Sri Lankan demon Ravana abducted the Indian goddess Sitadevi, a ring fell down from her hand and became a village in that shape. So it is called 'Seethangoli' or Seeth's 'Anguli,' or ring.

== Notable people ==
Anil Kumble, former captain and the former coach of Indian national cricket team takes his last name, indicating ancestry or family origins, from this town. Recently, one of the Main Road to Govt Hospital was renamed as Anil Kumble Road in a function conducted by Kumble Panchayat.

== Important Organizations ==
- Hindustan Aeronautical Limited
- Malik Deenar MBA College, Seethamgoly
- Malik Deenar College of Pharmacy, Seethangoli
- Khansa College for advanced studies, Narayanamangalam
- Muhimmathul Muslimeen Education Centre, Puthige

== Image gallery ==
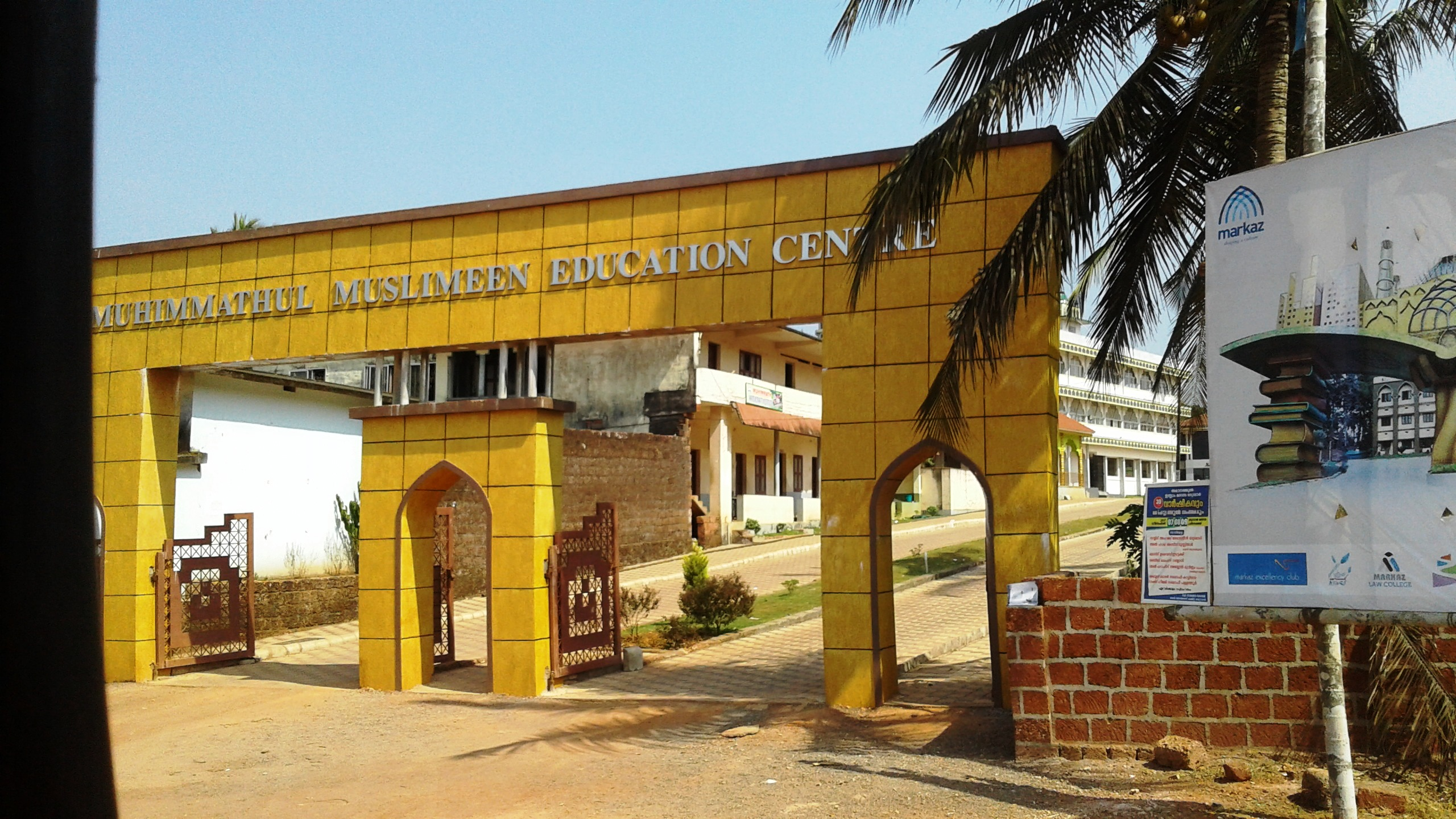
Muhimmath Muslimeen

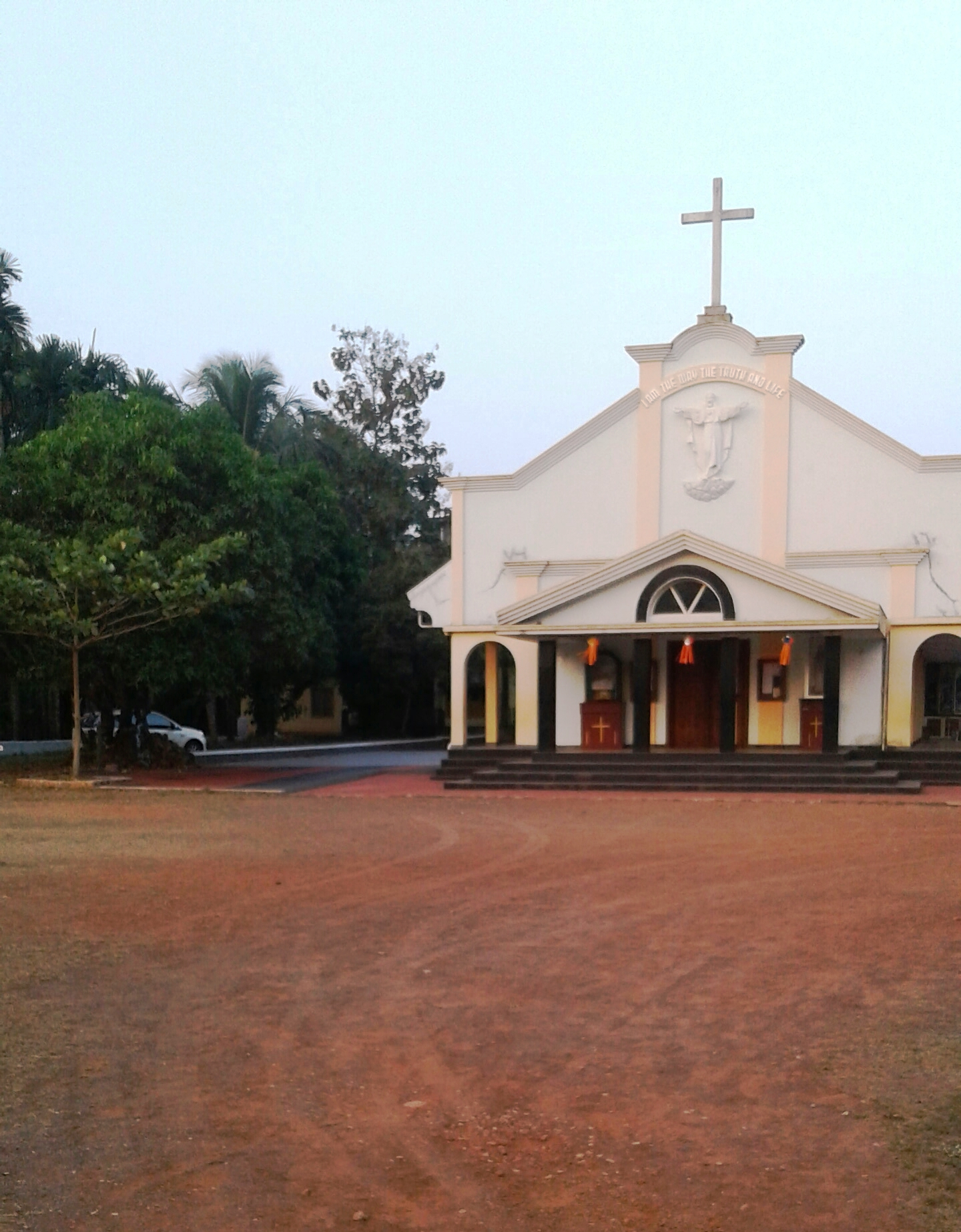
Monica Church

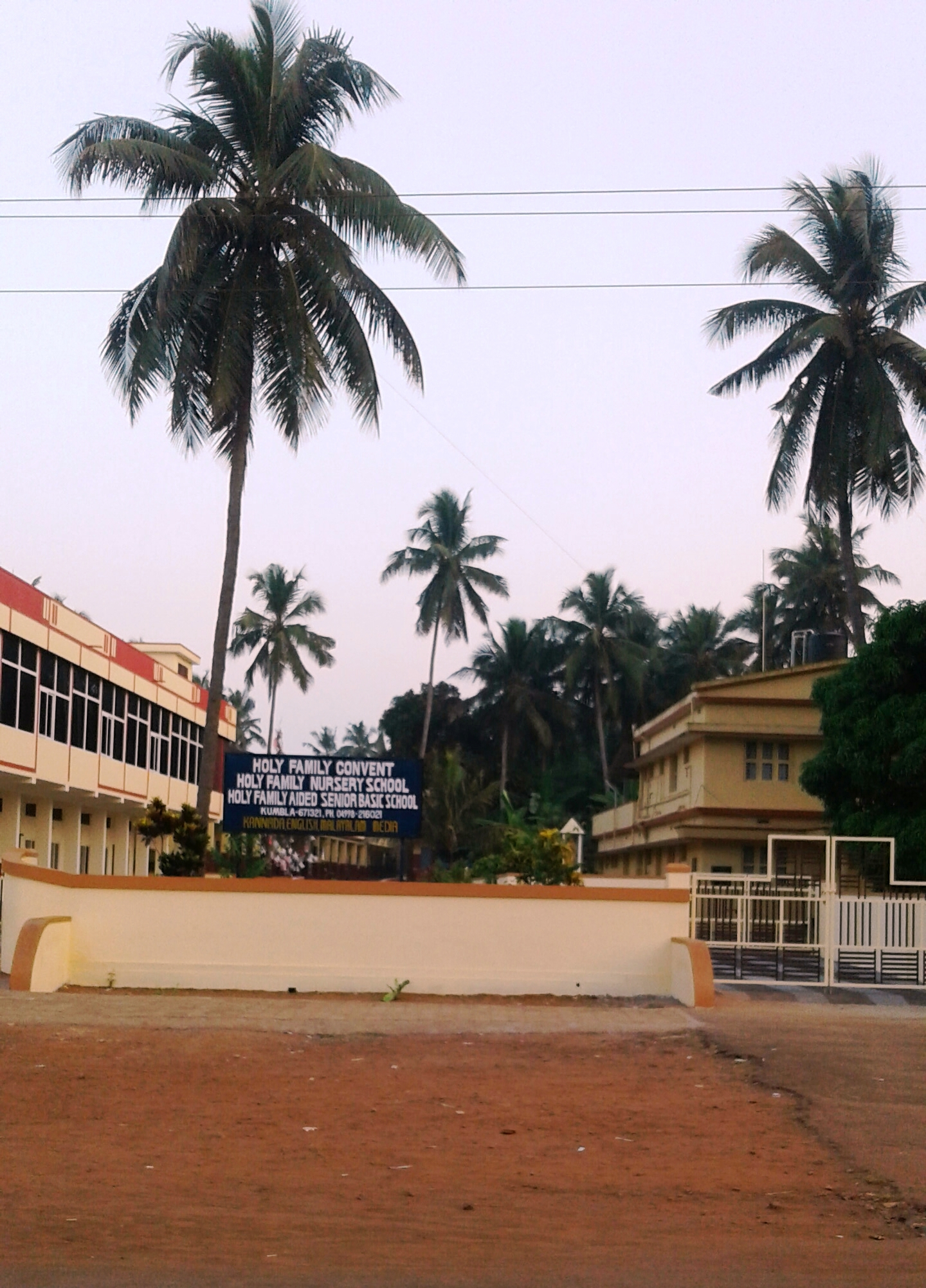
Holy family school

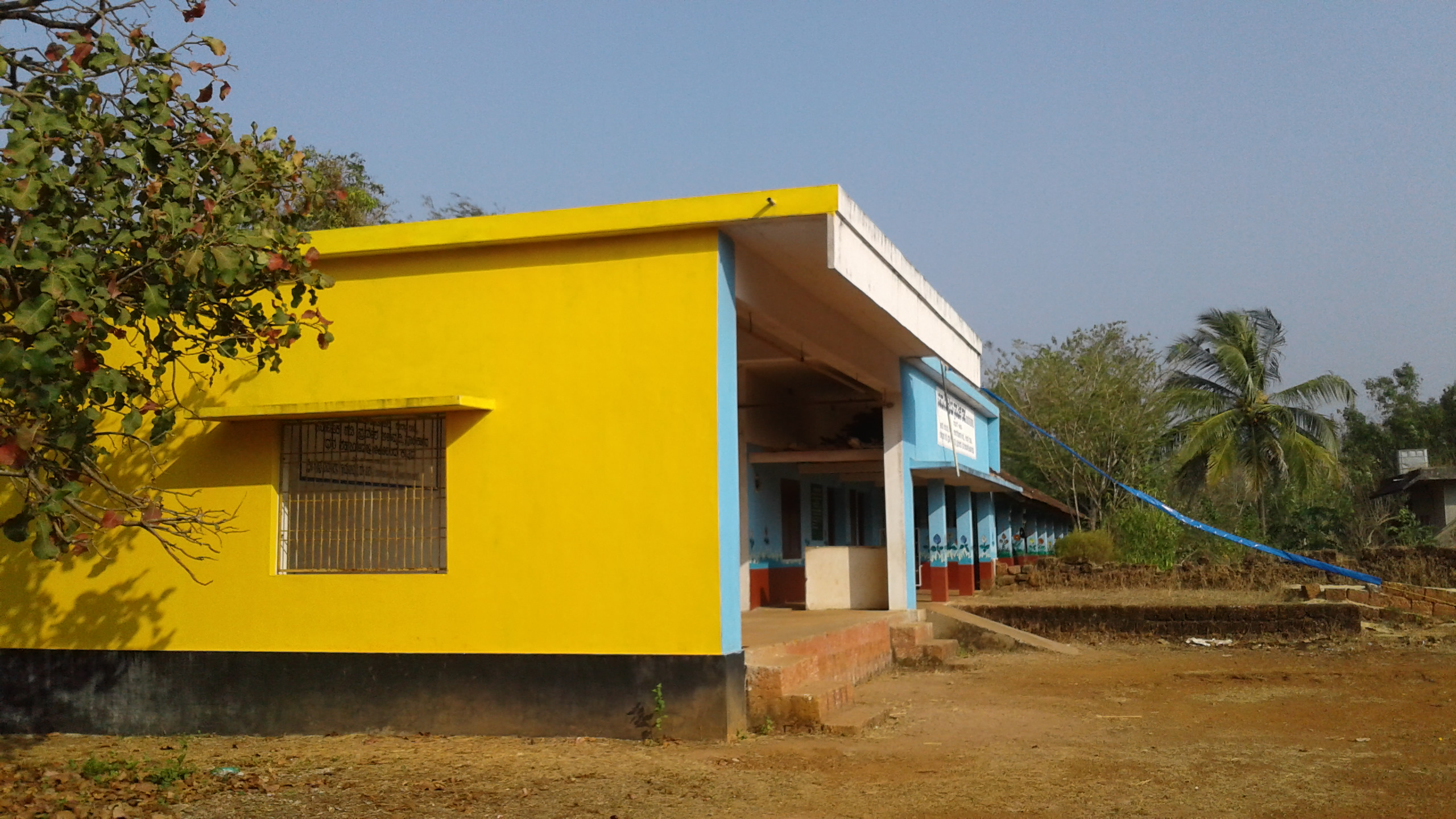
Narayanamangalam School

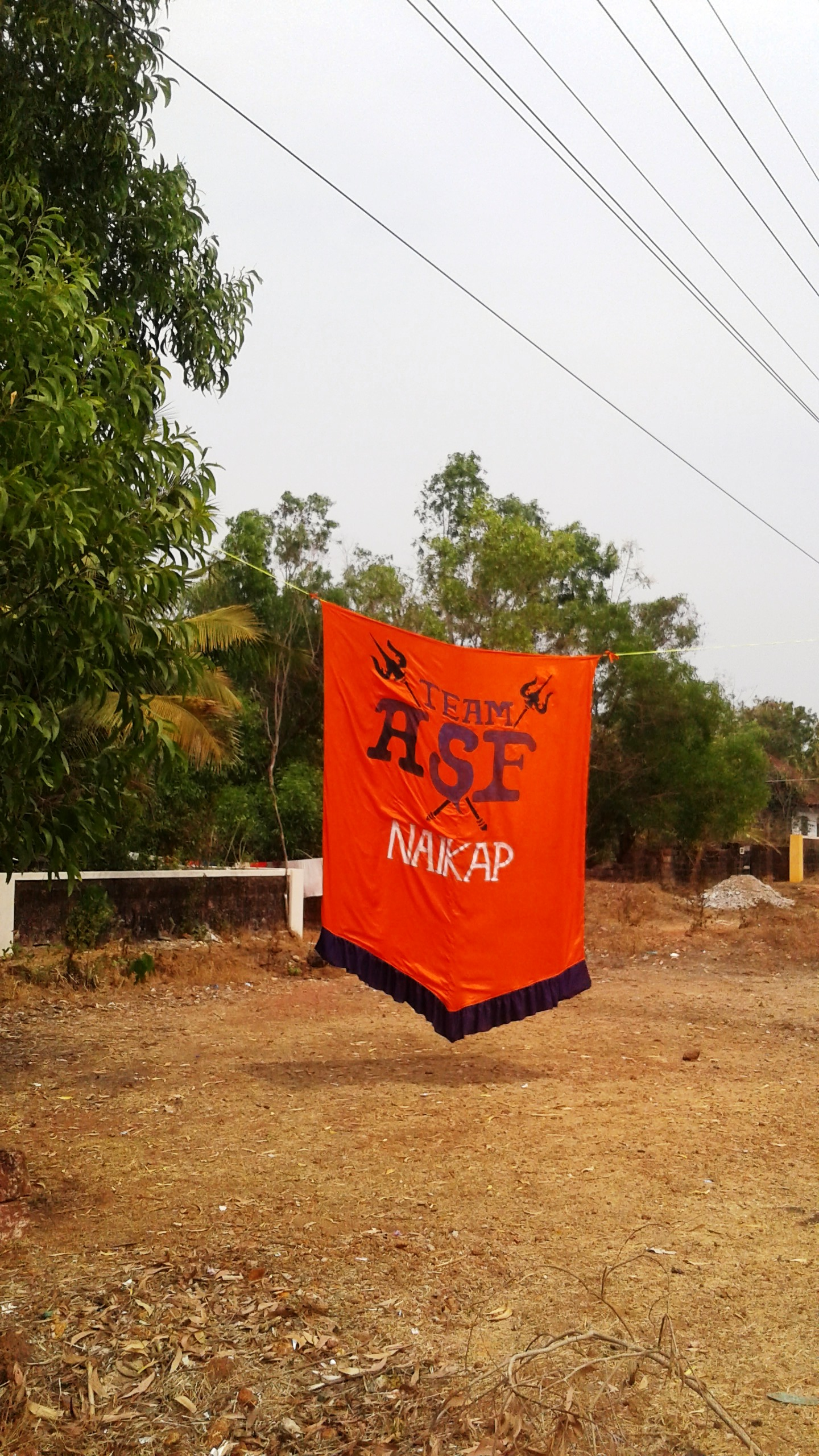
Naikap junction

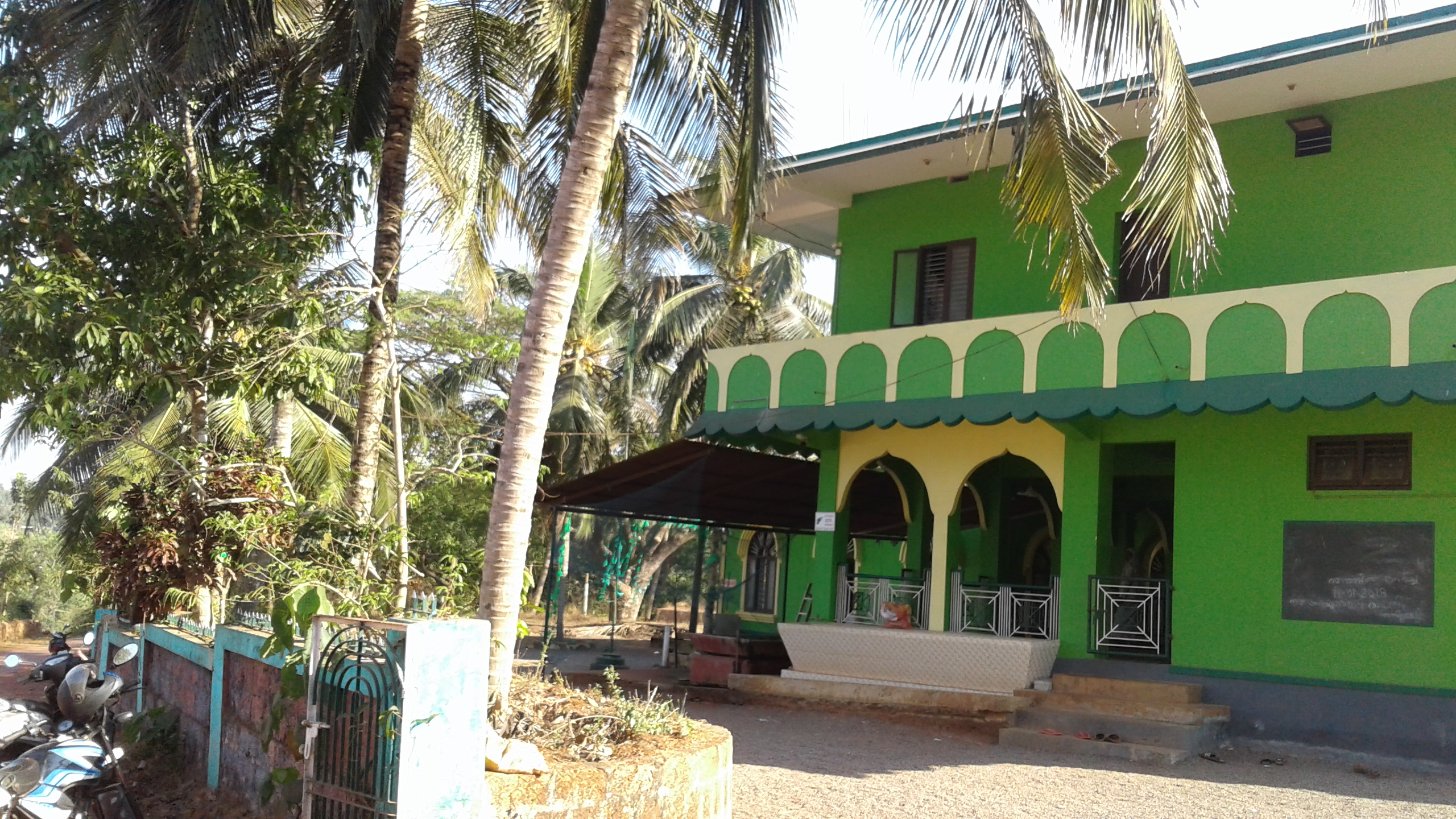
Manjathadka Dargah

== See also ==
- Kattathadka
- Uppala
- Perla
- Kasaragod District
- Kanipura Sri Gopalakrishna Temple
- Ananthapura Lake Temple
- Mukarikandam
