= Kodoth =

- village
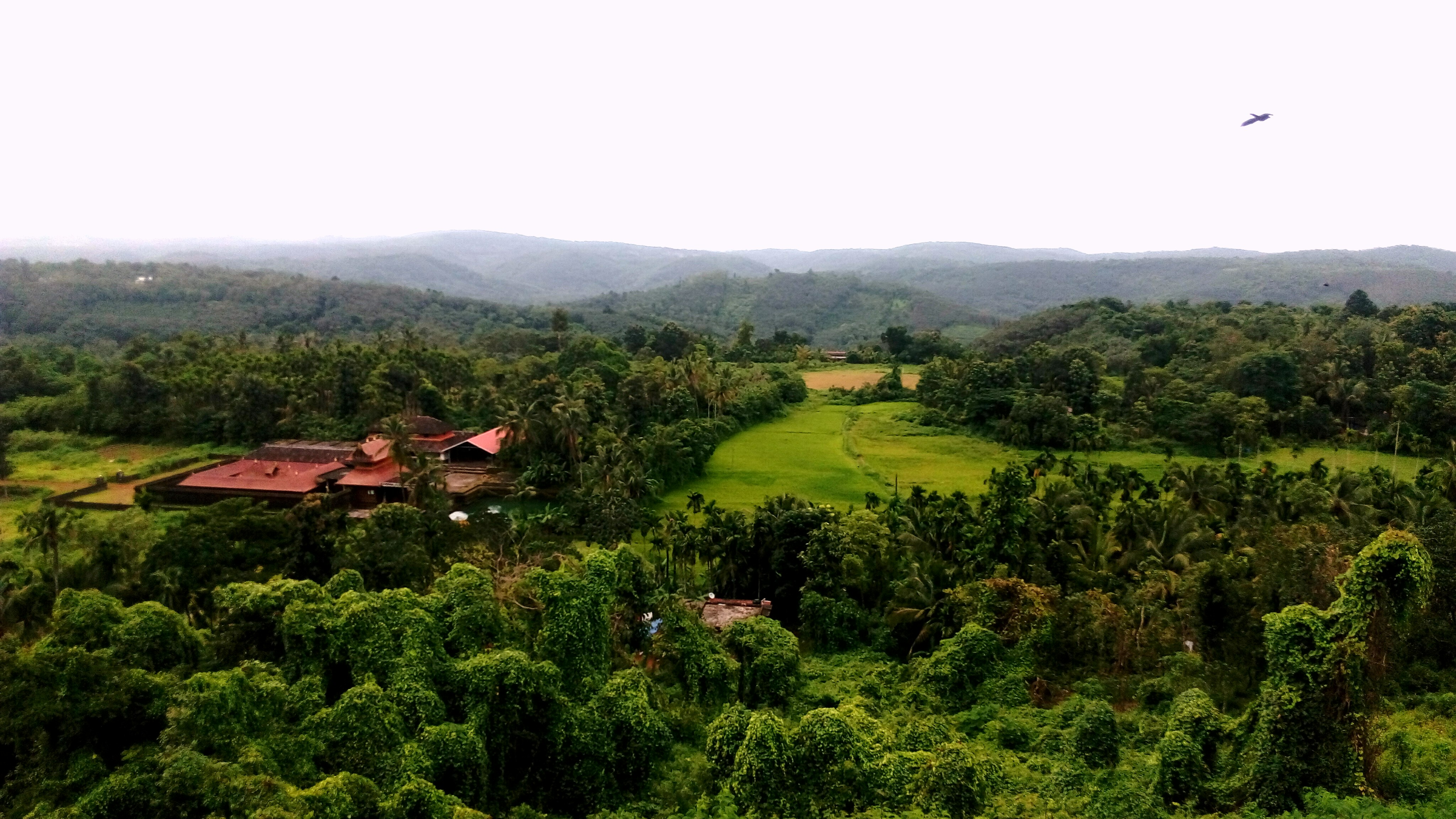

- Location in Kerala, India Kodoth (India)
- Coordinates: 12°24′50″N 75°11′21″E
- Country: India
- State: Kerala
- District: Kasaragod

Languages
  - Official: Malayalam, English
- Time zone: UTC+5:30 (IST)

Kodoth is a village in the Kasaragod district of Kerala, India.

== Transportation ==
Local roads have access to NH.66 which connects to Mangalore in the north and Calicut in the south. The nearest railway station is Kanhangad on Mangalore-Palakkad line. There are airports at Mangalore ,Kannur and Calicut.
