= Athinhal =

- village
- Location in Kerala, India Athinhal (India)
- Coordinates: 12°19′0″N 75°4′0″E
- Country: India
- State: Kerala
- District: Kasaragod

Languages
  - Official: Malayalam, English
- Time zone: UTC+5:30 (IST)
- PIN: 671329
- Telephone code: 0467
- Website: www.athinhal.com

Athinhal is a coastal village in Kasaragod district in the Indian state of Kerala. It is 28 km from the district capital of Kasaragod and one kilometer north of Kanhangad.

== Economy ==
The economy is dependent on the inflow of money from locals employed as migrant workers in the Persian Gulf countries. Ever since the oil boom of the 1970s, the village has witnessed a large-scale migration of young people to the oil producing Gulf countries in pursuit of work. This has changed the economic situation considerably. At least one person from each household is employed in the Gulf. In the past, the economy depended on agriculture. The greenery, which persisted once, has vanished, due to the spurting of concrete structures in the place of paddy fields. Now only the coconut farming survives and less than 5% people depend on agriculture.

== Climate ==
The southwest monsoon starts towards the end of May or the beginning of June, heralded by thunderstorms and remains until September when the rain fades out. October brings in the northeast monsoon. Dry weather sets in by the end of December. January and February are the coolest months of the year. March, April and May are very hot.

== Transportation ==
Local roads have access to NH.66 which connects to Mangalore in the north and Calicut in the south. The nearest railway station is Kanhangad on Mangalore-Palakkad line. There are airports at Mangalore, Kannur and Calicut.
