= Kunjar =

Kunjar is a remote village situated near Neerchal in Kasaragod district, Kerala, India. It is located 10 km north of Kasargod town. It has the 600-hundred-year-old Kunjar Juma masjid, Kunjar school, and Kunjar dam. The village lies on about 50 acres and with an average radius of 2 km from its centre.
