= Periyanganam =

Village in Kerala, India

Periyanganam is a village in Karindalam Panchayath of Kasaragod District in the Indian state of Kerala. Neighbouring places are Kolamkulam and other side is Kumbalappally, and on opposite sides are Palanthadam and Mayyanganam. The nearest city is Nileshwar 20 km away.

== Temples ==
In Periyanganam there is a Temple called Sree Dharma Shastham Kavu Shethram and a post office also a Government LP School.

== Transportation ==
The national highway passing through Nileshwaram connects to Mangalore in the north and Calicut in the south. The nearest railway station is Nileshwar on Mangalore-Palakkad line. There are airports at Mangalore and Calicut.
