= Kasaragod district =

District in Kerala, India

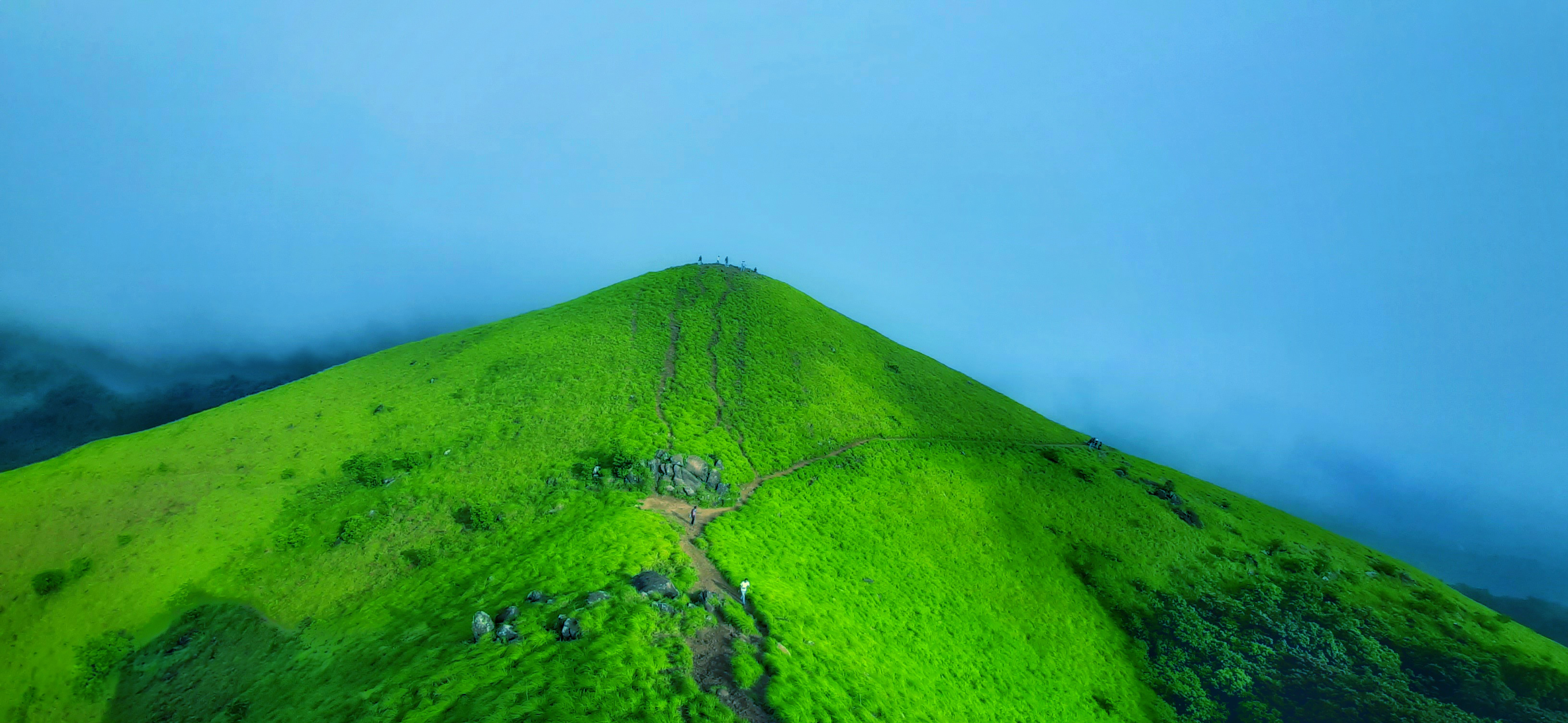
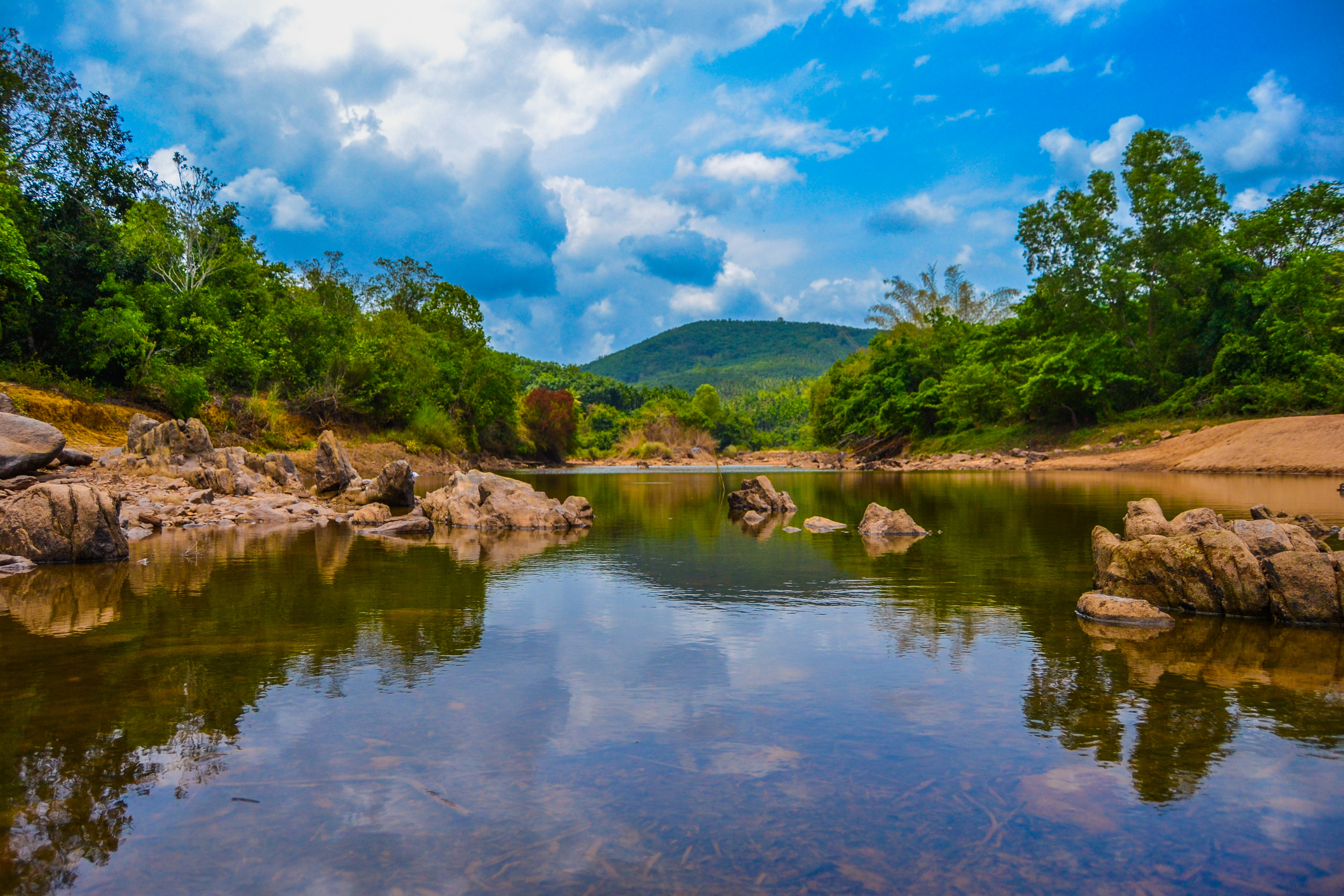
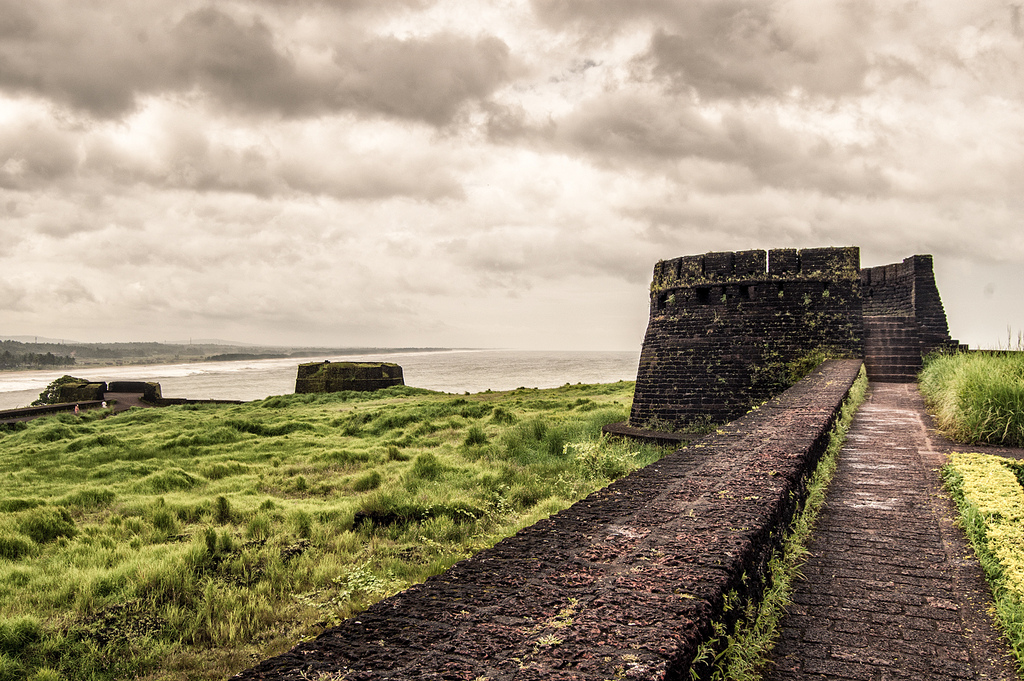
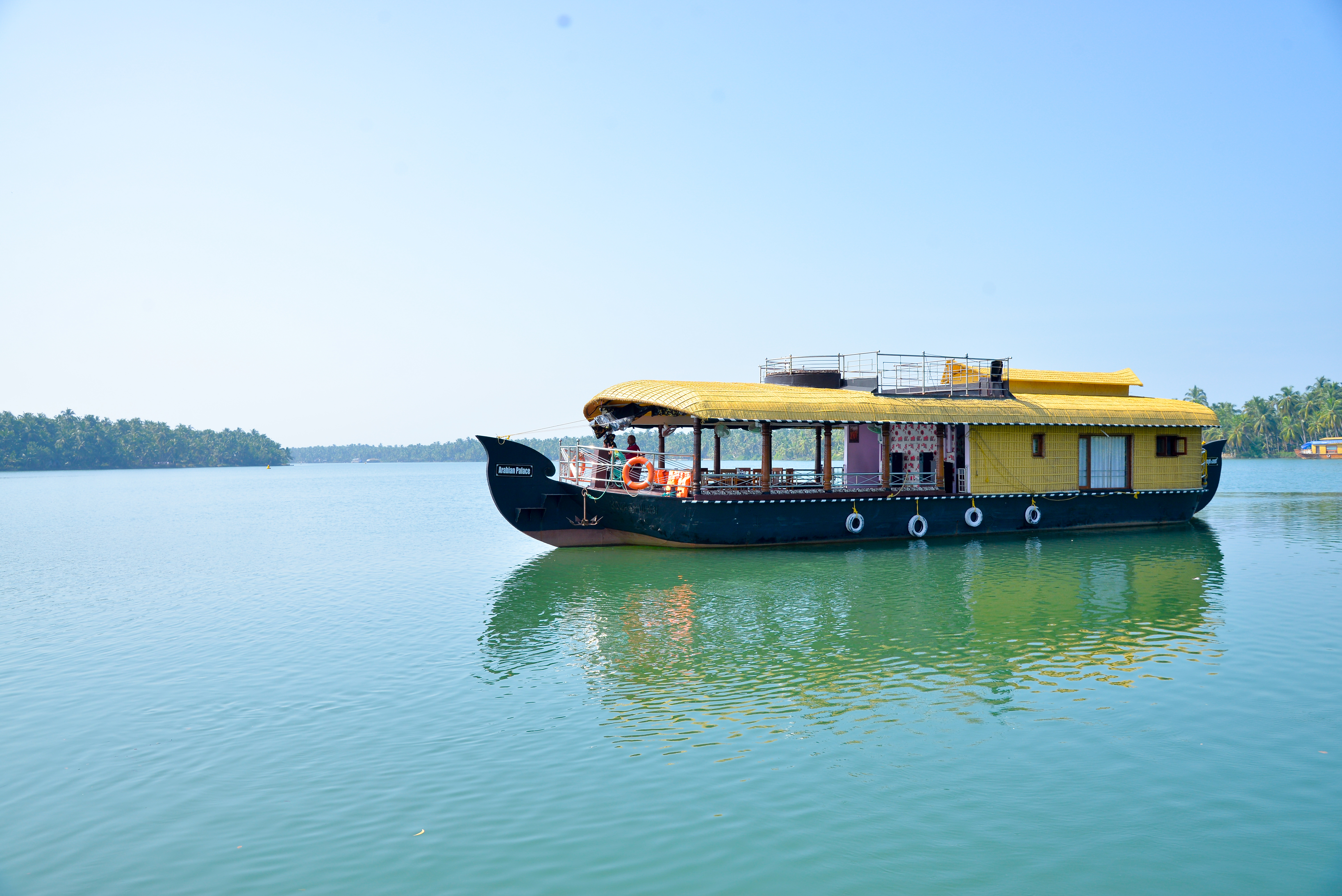
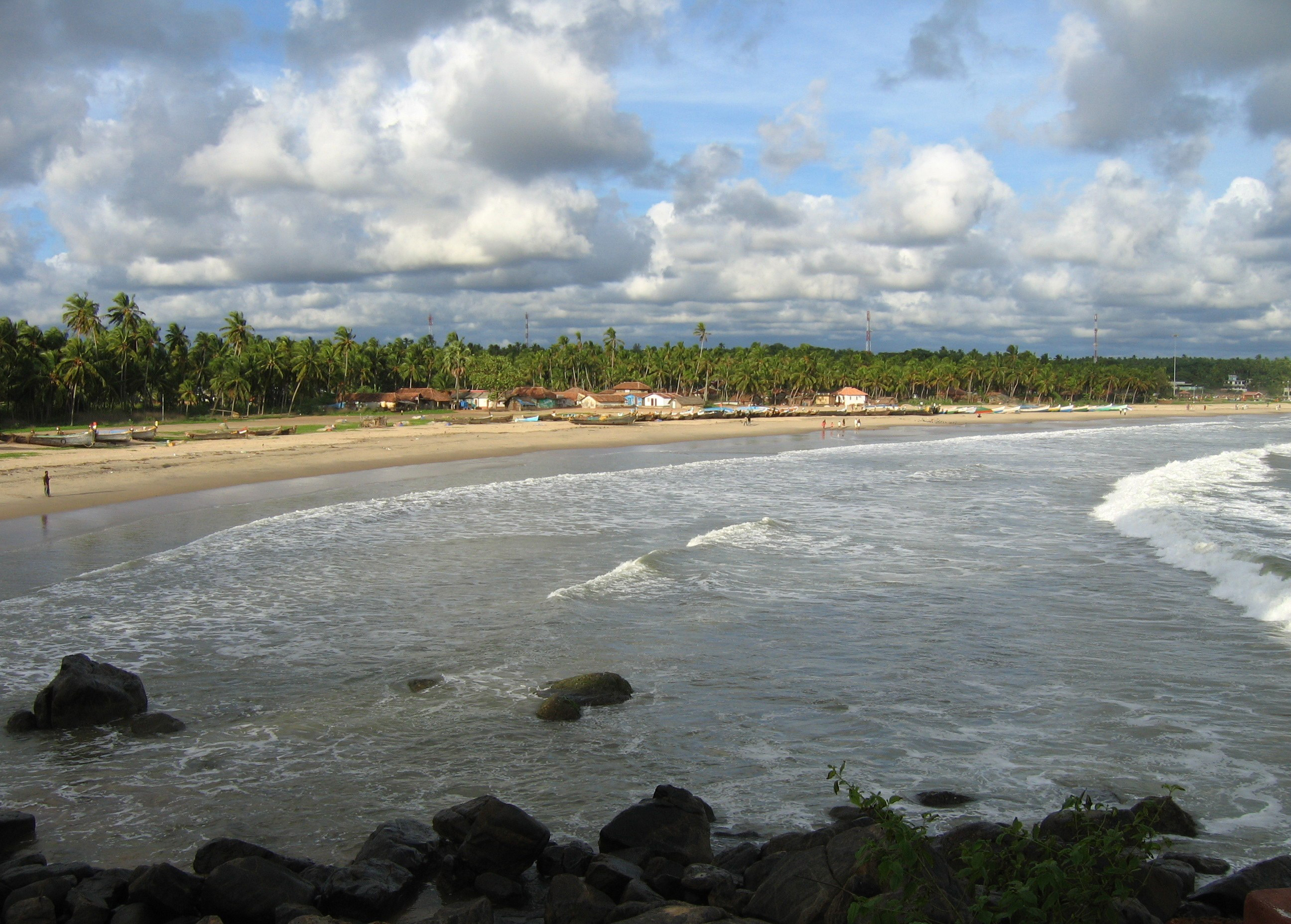
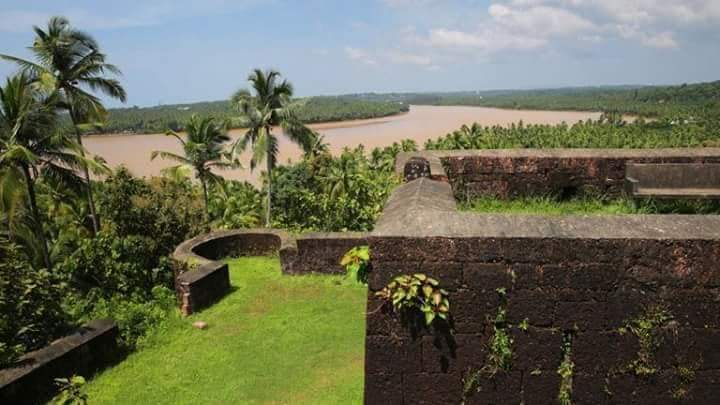
- Clockwise from top: Ranipuram, Bekal Fort, Bekal beach, Chandragiri fort, Kavvayi Backwaters at Nileshwaram, Chandragiri River at Kanathur near Kasaragod
- Nickname: The Land of Seven Languages
- Location in Kerala
- Interactive map of Kasaragod district
- Coordinates: 12.5°N 75°E
- Country: India
- State: Kerala
- Established: 24 May 1984; 42 years ago
- Founder: Government of Kerala
- Headquarters: Collectorate, Kasaragod
- Subdivisions: Revenue Divisions: 2: Kasaragod; Hosdurg; Taluks: 4: Kasaragod; Hosdurg; Manjeshwaram; Vellarikundu; Revenue villages: 128

Government
  - Type: District administration
  - District in-charge Minister: K.M. Shaji
  - Collector: Arjun Pandian IAS
  - District Police Chief: BV Vijaya Bharath Reddy IPS
  - MP: Rajmohan Unnithan (INC)
  - MLAs: Kallatra Mahin (Kasaragod); Sandeep Varier (Trikaripur); K. Neelakandan (Udma); Govindan Pallikappil (Kanhangad); A. K. M. Ashraf (Manjeshwaram)

Area
  - Total: 1,992 km^{2} (769 sq mi)
  - Rank: 13th

Population (2018)
  - Total: 1,390,894
  - Density: 698/km^{2} (1,810/sq mi)

Demographics
  - Language (2011): 82.7% Malayalam; 8.8% Tulu; 4.2% Kannada; 4.3% Others
  - Religion (2011): 55.8% Hinduism; 37.2% Islam; 6.7% Christianity; 0.3% Others

Human Development
  - Sex ratio (2011): 1080 ♀/1000 ♂
  - Literacy (2011): 90.09%
- Time zone: UTC+5:30 (IST)
- PIN: 671121
- Telephone code: 0499
- ISO 3166 code: IN-KL
- Vehicle registration: KL-14, KL-60, KL-79
- HDI (2005): ▲0.760 (High)
- Official Tree; Official flower; Official Specie; Official Bird: Kanjiram; Crinum malabaricum; Bheemanama; White Bellied Sea Hawk
- Website: kasargod.nic.in

Kasaragod district (Malayalam: [kaːsɐrɡoːɖɨ̆] (Tulu: Kāsrōḍ, Kannada: Kāsaragūḍu, Konkani: Kāsāragōḍa; English: Kassergode) is one of the 14 districts in the southern Indian state of Kerala. Its northern border Thalappady is located just 9 km south to Ullal, which is the southernmost portion of the major port city Mangalore, on the southwestern Malabar coast of India.

Kasaragod is the northernmost district of Kerala and is also known as Saptha Bhasha Sangama Bhoomi (The place where Seven languages meets)

The district is situated on the rich biodiversity of the Western Ghats. It was a part of the Kannur district of Kerala until 24 May 1984. It also remains the last formed district of Kerala to date. The district is bounded by Dakshina Kannada district to the north, Western Ghats to the northeast, Kodagu district to the southeast, Kannur district to the south, and the Arabian Sea to the west. Kasaragod district has the maximum number of rivers in Kerala - 12.

Kasaragod town is located on the estuary where the Chandragiri River, which is also the longest river in the district, empties into Arabian Sea. Kasaragod is home to several forts which include Arikady fort, Bekal Fort, Chandragiri Fort, and Hosdurg Fort. Bekal Fort is also the largest fort in Kerala. The historic hill of Ezhimala is located on the southern portion of Kavvayi Backwaters of Nileshwaram. Talakaveri, which is home to Talakaveri Wildlife Sanctuary where the 805 km long Kaveri River originates, is located closer to Ranipuram in Kerala-Karnataka border. Robert Caldwell describes the extent of Malayalam in the late 19th century as extending from Chandragiri fort and Chandragiri River in the north to Neyyar River beyond Thiruvananthapuram in the south.

Tulunadu, where Tulu language is traditionally spoken, is said to be bound on the south by the Chandragiri river and fort, thus including Kasaragod city within the Tulunadu region. Historian N. Shyam Bhat states that at present, the Tulu nadu can linguistically be said to extend to the south up to the river Chandragiri or Payaswini, and culturally up to the Kavvayi river in the south, as the region between the Chandragiri and Kavai (Kavvayi) rivers presents the characteristics of a twilight zone between the Malayalam and Tulu speaking areas.

Kasargod is also the first district in India to have official symbols-official tree, flower, bird, species.

== Etymology ==
From the Kannada words kāsara "strychnine tree" and gōḍe "fort". Until the 16th century CE, Kasaragod town was known by the name Kāññirakkōṭŭ from Malayalam kāññiram "strychnine tree" and kōṭŭ "fort".

== History ==
=== Ancient period ===
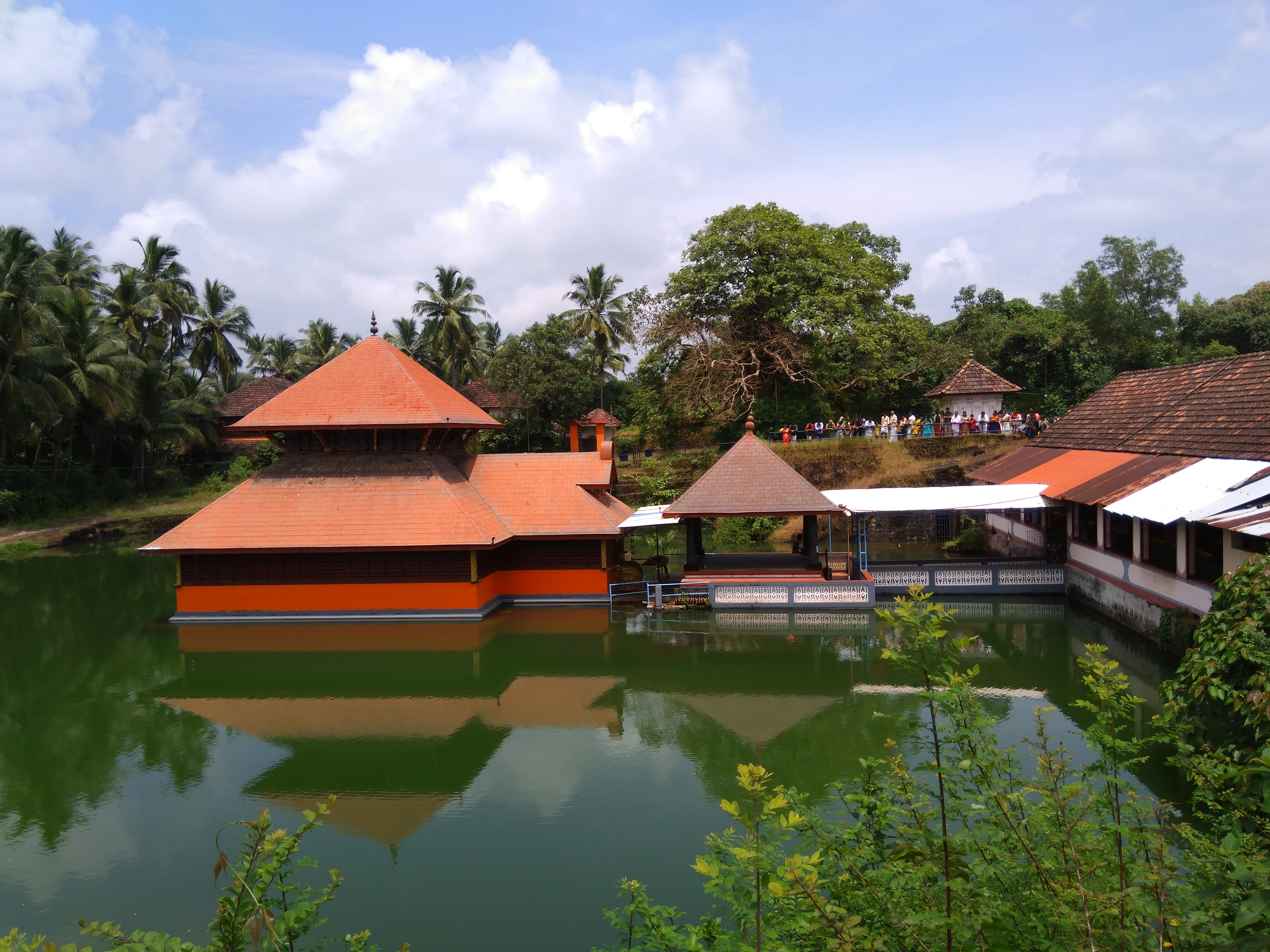
Ananthapadmanabhaswamy temple at Ananthapura, Kumbla

The Ancient Tamil Works of Sangam Age records that the area covering the district was part of Puzhinadu, which consists of the coastal belt from Kozhikode to Mangalore. Politically the area was part of the Ezhimala Kingdom with its Capital at Ezhimala in present day Kannur district. The most famous King of Ezhimala was Nannan whose kingdom extended up to Gudalur and northern parts of Coimbatore. Poozhinad, along with Karkanad which included the eastern regions of Ezhimala dynasty (Wayanad-Gudalur region with some portions of Kodagu), had its capital at Ezhimala. The Mooshaka Kings were considered descendants of Nannan. By the 14th century, Mooshaka Kingdom was known as Kolathirinad and the Rulers as Kolathiris. The Kolathunad Kingdom at the peak of its power reportedly extended from Netravati River (Mangalore) in the north to Korapuzha (Kozhikode) in the south with Arabian Sea on the west and Kodagu hills on the eastern boundary, also including the isolated islands of Lakshadweep in Arabian Sea.

=== Medieval period ===
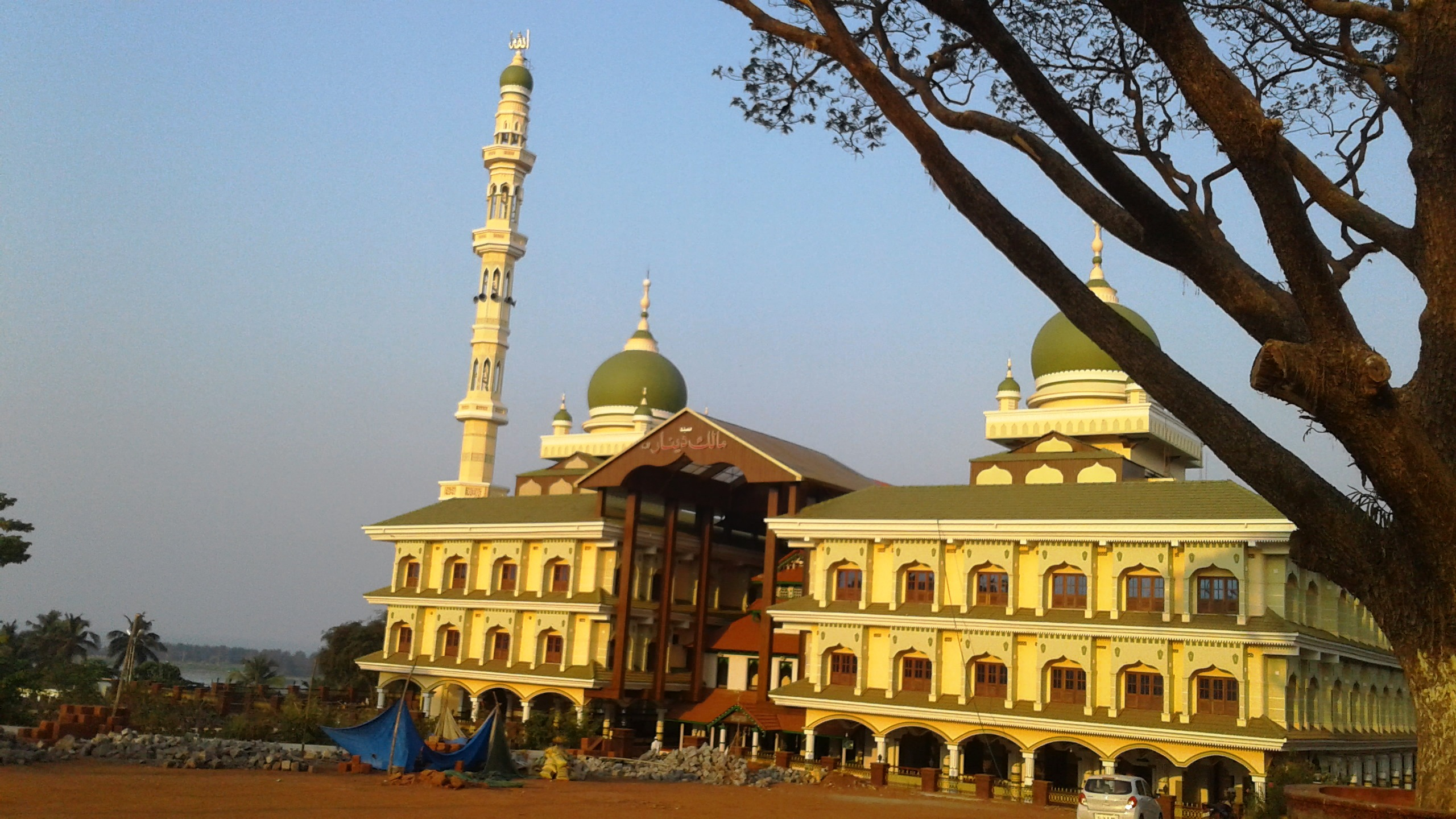
Malik Dinar Mosque, Kasaragod, is one of the oldest mosques in India.

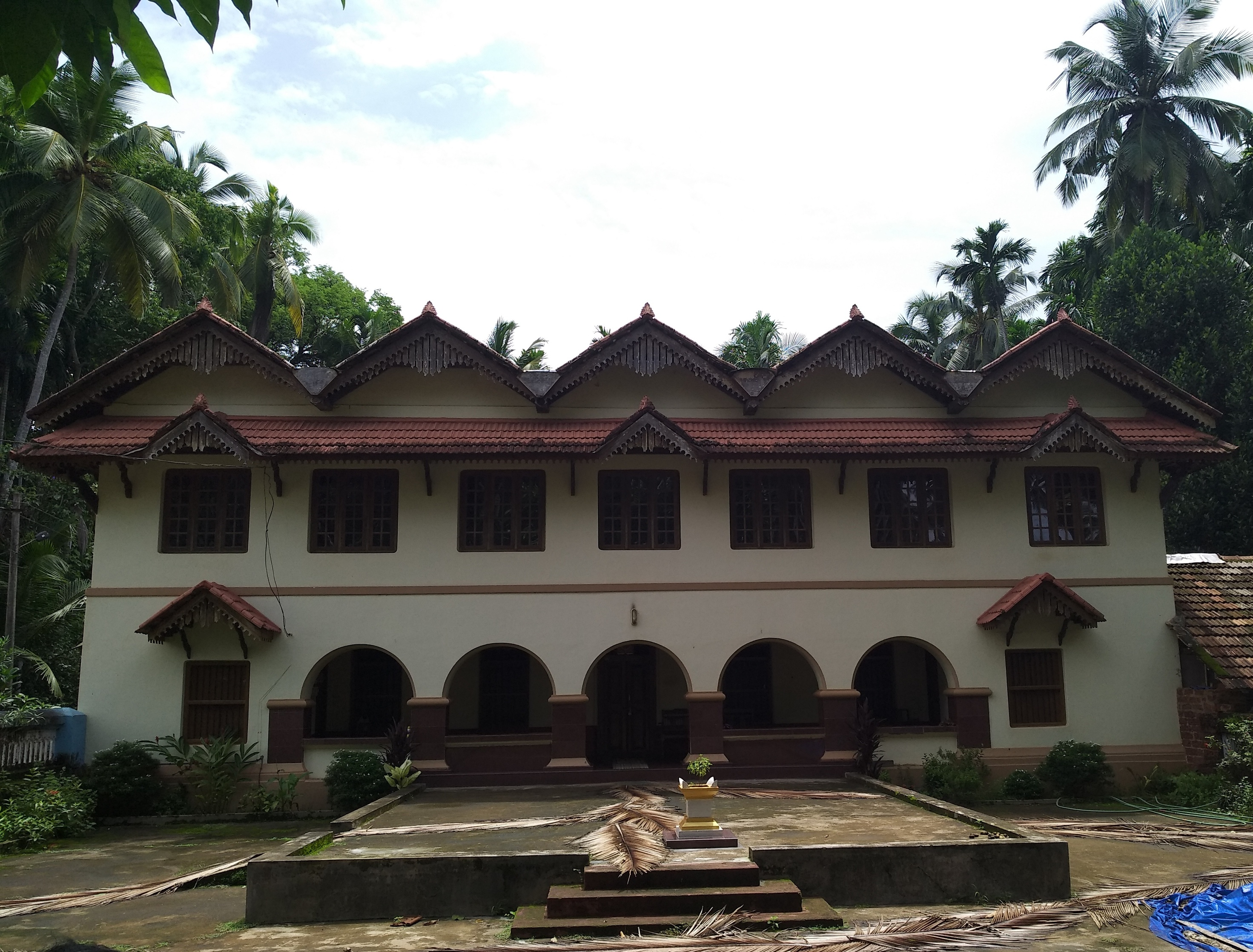
Maipady palace

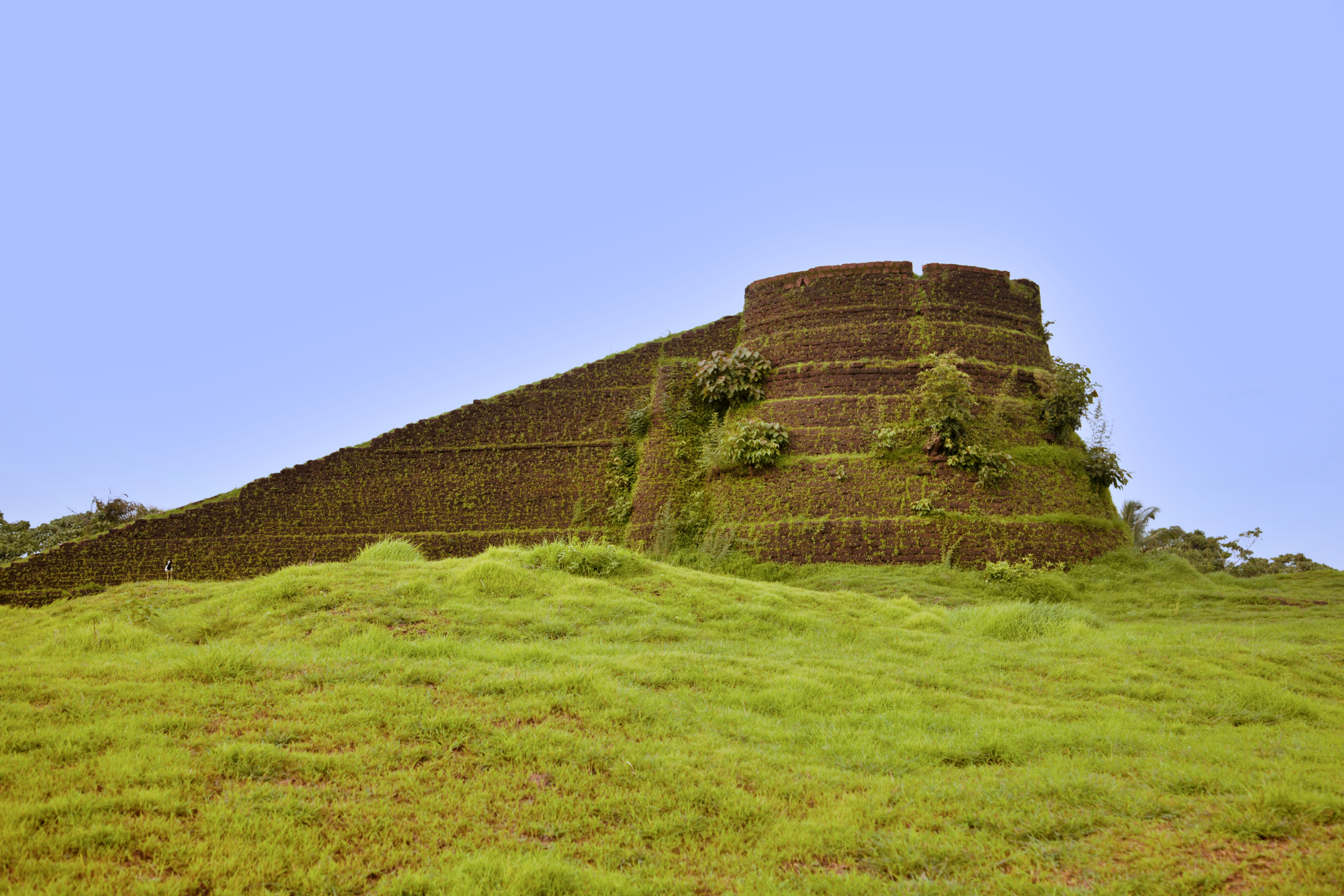
Arikady fort at Kumbla

Ramacharitam, probably the oldest literary work written in Old Malayalam, which dates back to the 12th century CE, is thought to have been written in Kasargod district as its manuscripts were discovered from Nileshwaram and the poem mentions about Ananthapura Lake Temple in Kumbla in detail. Kasaragod was known to the Arabs by the name Harkwillia. Malik Dinar Mosque at Kasaragod town is one of the oldest mosques in the Indian subcontinent. According to Qissat Shakarwati Farmad, the Masjids at Kodungallur, Kollam, Madayi, Barkur, Mangalore, Kasaragod, Kannur, Dharmadam, Panthalayini, and Chaliyam, were built during the era of Malik Dinar, and they are among the oldest Masjids in the Indian subcontinent. It is believed that Malik Dinar died at Thalangara in Kasaragod town.

Many Arab travelers visiting Kerala between the 9th and the 14th centuries visited Kasaragod, being an important trade centre then. Duarte Barbosa, a Portuguese traveler who visited Kumbla, near Kasargod in 1514 recorded that rice being exported for coir to Maldives. According to Barbosa, the people in the southwestern Malabar coast of India from Kumbla in the north to Kanyakumari in the south spoke a unique language, which they called as "Maliama" (Malayalam).

Until the 16th century CE, Kasargod town was known by the name Kanhirakode (may be by the meaning, 'The land of Kanhira Trees') in Malayalam. The Kumbla dynasty, who swayed over the land of southern Tulu Nadu wedged between Chandragiri River and Netravati River (including present-day Taluks of Manjeshwar and Kasaragod) from Maipady Palace at Kumbla, had also been vassals to the Kolathunadu kingdom of North Malabar, before the Carnatic conquests of Vijayanagara Empire. The Kumbla dynasty had a mixed lineage of Malayali Nairs and Tuluva Brahmins. They also claimed their origin from Cheraman Perumals of Kerala. Francis Buchanan-Hamilton states that the customs of Kumbla dynasty were similar to those of the contemporary Malayali kings.

The Kolathiri Dominion emerged into independent 10 principalities i.e., Kadathanadu (Vadakara), Randathara or Poyanad (Dharmadom), Kottayam (Thalassery), Nileshwaram, Iruvazhinadu (Panoor), Kurumbranad etc., under separate royal chieftains due to the outcome of internal dissensions. Many portions of the present-day Hosdurg taluk (Kanhangad) and Vellarikundu were parts of the Nileshwaram dynasty, who were relatives to both Kolathunadu as well as Zamorin of Calicut, in the early medieval period. The areas north to the Chandragiri river (present-day Taluks of Manjeshwaram and Kasaragod) were ruled by the Kumbala dynasty. According to local legends, the region between Talapadi and Kavvayi rivers which constituted the erstwhile Kasaragod taluk, consisted of 32 Tulu and 32 Malayalam villages.

Kannada kingdoms focused on Kasaragod in the 16th century CE. The Vijayanagara Empire attacked and annexed Kasaragod from the Kolathiri Raja with Nileshwaram as one of the capital in the 16th century. During the decline of the Vijayanagara Empire, the administration of this area was vested with Ikkeri Nayakas. At the onset of collapse of the Vijayanagara empire, Venkappa Nayaka declared independence to Ikkery. Kumbla, Chandragiri, and Bekal are considered to be the chain of forts constructed or renovated by Shivappa Nayaka.

The Chandragiri Fort is built on the southern bank of the estuary of Chandragiri River, just opposite to Kasaragod town. The Bekal Fort at Bekal, Pallikkara, which is situated in the midway between Kasaragod and Kanhangad, and is also largest fort in Kerala, was built in 1650 by Shivappa Nayaka of Keladi.

=== Modern period ===
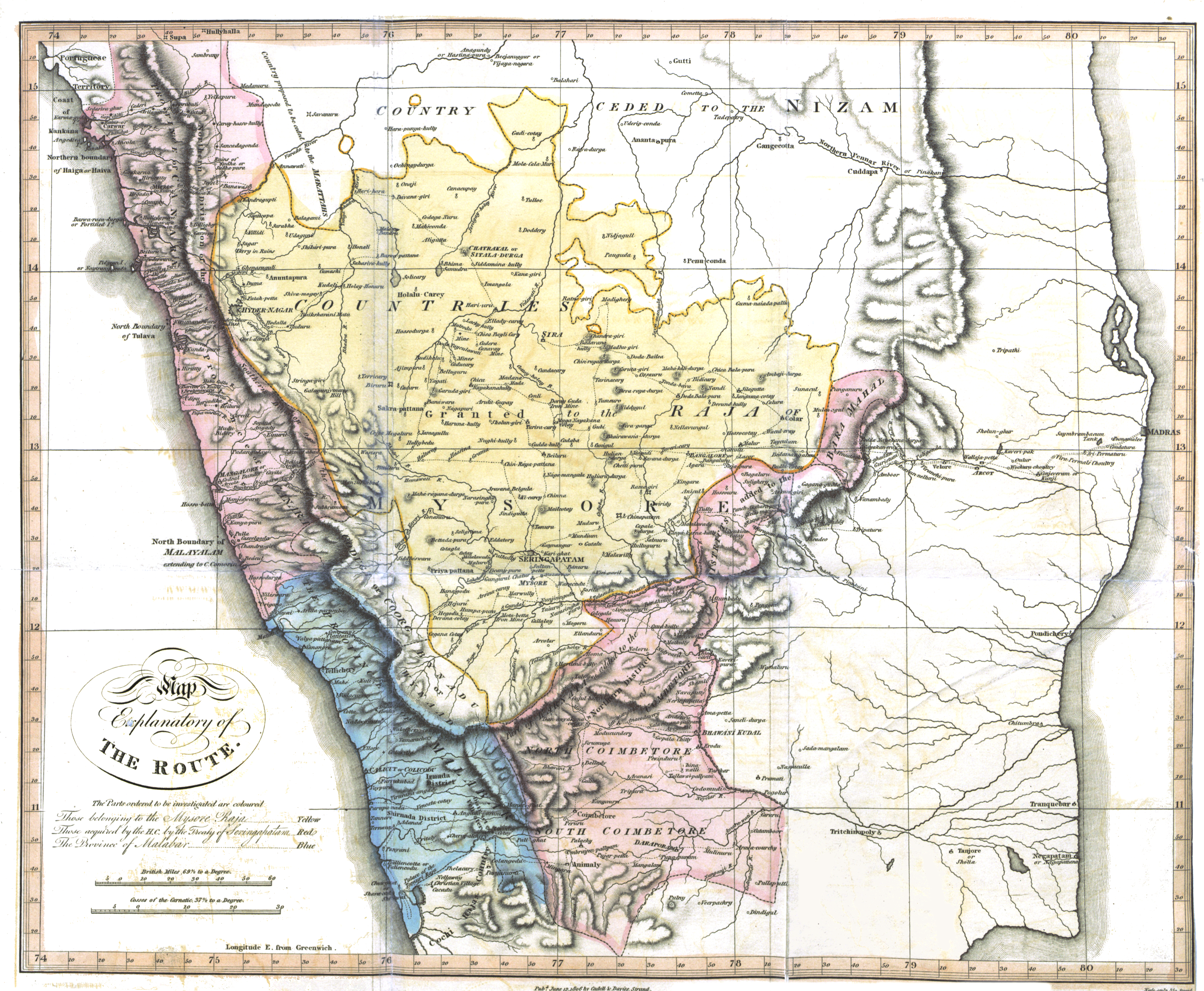
A map of Malabar District (Malayalam district) drawn by Francis Buchanan-Hamilton in 1807. Kasaragod region to the south of Payaswini/Chandragiri River of South Canara was also included in Malayalam region (just above the blue shaded region).

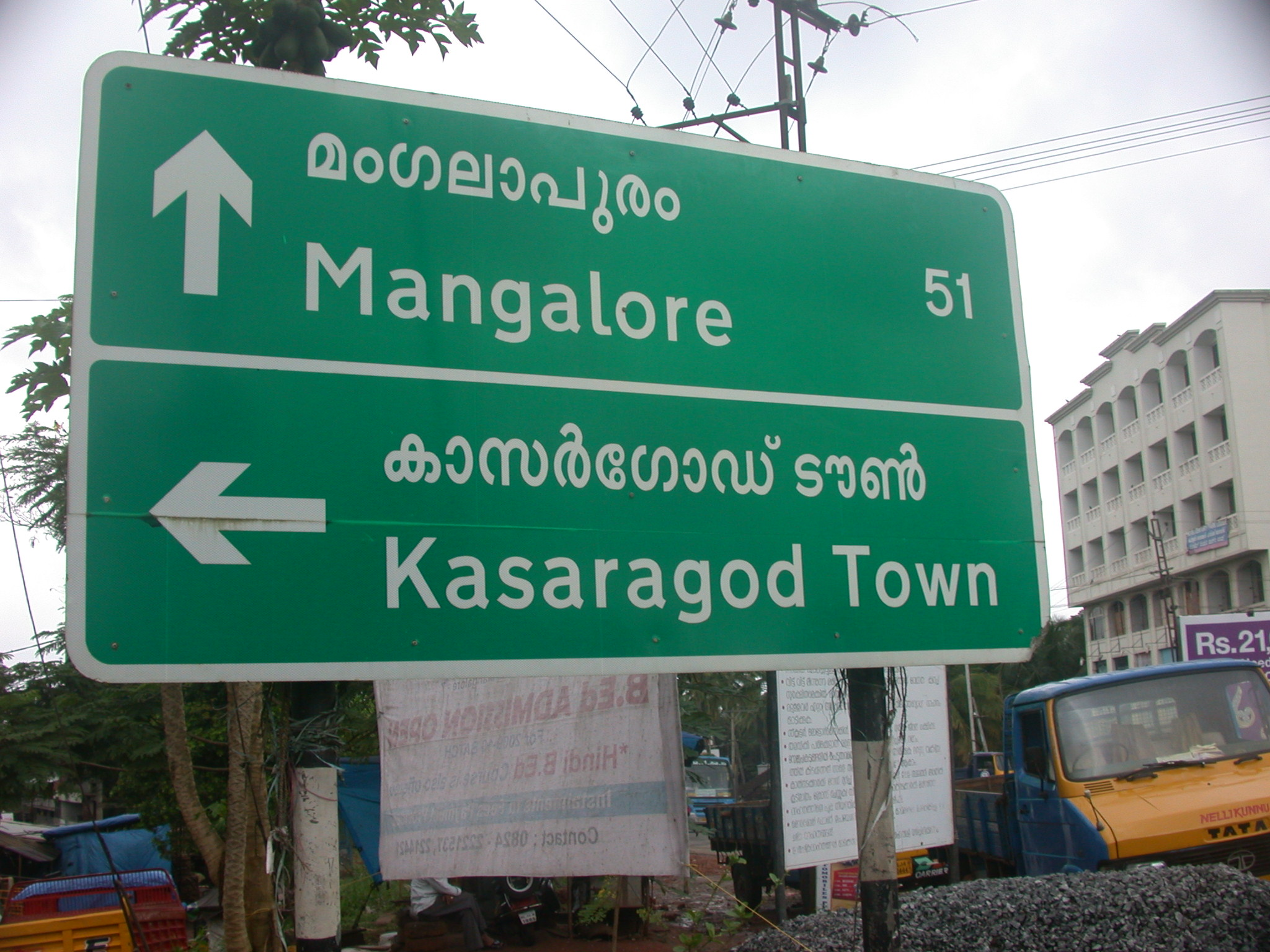
Road sign in Kasaragod town

Sunset at Valiyaparamba beach

Kasargod is famous for its ancient forts.

Francis Buchanan, the family doctor of Arthur Wellesley, visited Kasaragod in 1800. In his travelogue, he recorded information on places like Athiraparambu, Kavvai, Nileshwaram, Bekal, Chandragiri and Manjeshwar. Hosdurg and Vellarikundu is part of Kolathunadu (south of Chandragiri River) and Kasargod and Manjeshwaram is in the Tulu Nadu region (north of Chandragiri River). On 19 January 1801, Francis speaks of visiting a Siva temple at Pulla (Pallikere), beyond which, the country rises into open rising lands, all the way to Chandragiri river and Chandragiri fort, which he describes as the northern border of the Malayala. He says that the country on the north of the Chandragiri fort and river is called by Hindus as Tulunadu, the Tulu country. According to Stuart (1895) "The Kasargod taluk originally formed the southern portion of the ancient Tulunadu kingdom and was separated from the kingdom of Kerala by the Chandragiri River which was formerly called "Perumpula"; the river on which the fort stands is shallow but very wide and formed the southern boundary of the ancient Tuluva kingdom. The nayars and the other females of the Kasargod taluk of south Canara, are prohibited from crossing the river." In 1763, Hyder Ali raided Bedanoor (Bidnur), the capital of the Ikkery Naiks. His son Tippu Sultan raided much of Malabar region in Kerala. As per the Treaty of Seringapatam of 1792, Tippu surrendered Malabar, except Kanara to the British. The British occupied Kanara only after the death of Tippu Sultan. it is said that Kinavoor Molom (Sree Dharma Shashtha Temple) is belonging to Karinthalam (one of 64 Brahmin villages in old Kerala).

Before the formation of Kerala, Kasargod was a part of South Canara district of erstwhile Madras Presidency. Initially South Canara was included in the Bombay presidency. Later on 16 April 1862, South Canara was transferred to Madras Presidency and Kasaragod taluk was formed by replacing the erstwhile Bekal taluk. However, in the 19th century CE, Kasargod Taluk witnessed many struggles to separate the region from South Canara and to merge it with the Malabar District as it was the only Malayalam-majority region in South Canara. Kasaragod was the second-most populated Taluk in South Canara only after to Mangalore taluk, and also the second-largest Taluk. Kasargod became a part of Kannur district of Kerala following the reorganization of states and the formation of Kerala on 1 November 1956. Later Kasargod was divided into two Taluks for the ease of administration - Kasargod and Hosdurg. Kasargod was declared a district in 1984. The inclusion of Kasaragod with Kerala has been a contentious issue as there is a sizeable population that speaks Tulu language and Kannada. At the time of 1951 Census of India, only 72.0% of the district's population chose their mother tongue as Malayalam. 14.2% chose Tulu and 6.3% chose Kannada. But it is noted that as per the 2011 census report only 8.8% and 4.2% of the total population in the district speak Tulu and Kannada respectively as their mother tongue. In 2012, the Second Oommen Chandy ministry appointed a commission under the leadership the former Chief Secretary P. Prabhakaran to study about the backwardness and issues faced by this northernmost district of Kerala and to draw up special package for the district. In 2013, two more Taluks, namely Manjeshwaram and Vellarikundu were formed in the district.

== Geography ==
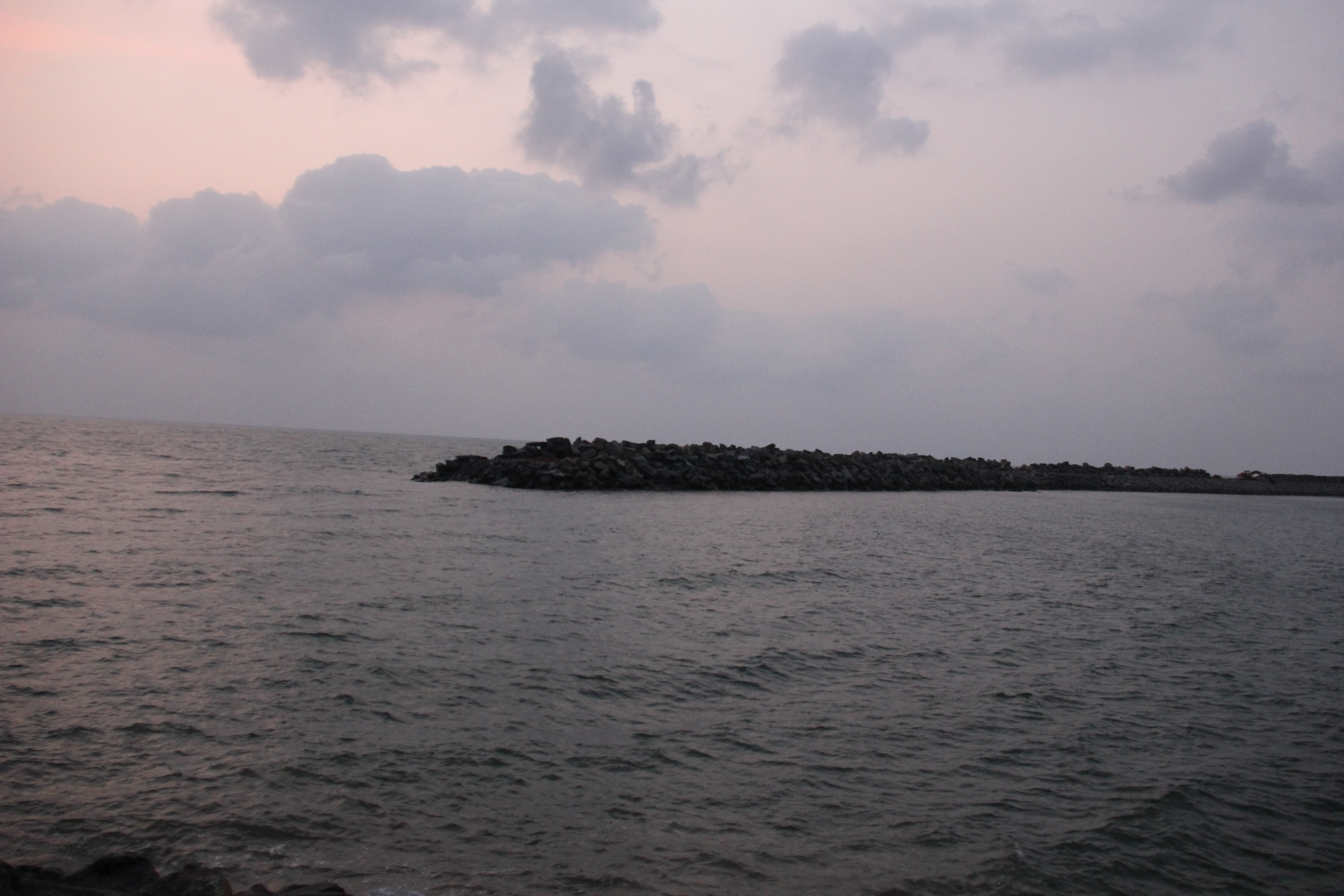
Manjeshwaram harbour

The district is the northernmost district of the State of Kerala. Kasargod is located at 12.5°N 75.0°E. It has an average elevation of 19 metres (62 feet). Ranipuram or Madathumala (1016m) peak is the highest peak in the Kasargod district of Kerala, located in the Ranipuram Wildlife Sanctuary.

=== Climate ===
Kasaragod has a tropical climate.

Climate data for Kasargod
| Month | Jan | Feb | Mar | Apr | May | Jun | Jul | Aug | Sep | Oct | Nov | Dec | Year |
|---|---|---|---|---|---|---|---|---|---|---|---|---|---|
| Mean daily maximum °C (°F) | 33.1 (91.6) | 33.3 (91.9) | 33.9 (93.0) | 34.3 (93.7) | 33.4 (92.1) | 29.8 (85.6) | 28.7 (83.7) | 28.8 (83.8) | 30.1 (86.2) | 31.2 (88.2) | 32.7 (90.9) | 33.1 (91.6) | 31.9 (89.4) |
| Mean daily minimum °C (°F) | 21.1 (70.0) | 21.9 (71.4) | 23.7 (74.7) | 24.9 (76.8) | 24.9 (76.8) | 23.5 (74.3) | 23 (73) | 23 (73) | 23.2 (73.8) | 23.2 (73.8) | 22.7 (72.9) | 21.3 (70.3) | 23.0 (73.4) |
| Average precipitation mm (inches) | 0.8 (0.03) | 0 (0) | 17.3 (0.68) | 32.7 (1.29) | 182.9 (7.20) | 1,010.5 (39.78) | 1,002.8 (39.48) | 663.6 (26.13) | 246.5 (9.70) | 222.6 (8.76) | 69 (2.7) | 12.4 (0.49) | 3,461.1 (136.24) |
Source: Meo Weather

=== Rivers ===
Kasaragod district has the largest number of rivers in Kerala - 12. All of them are west-flowing rivers. The longest of them is Chandragiri River (105 km long). Kasaragod town is located on the estuary of Chandragiri river. It empties into the Arabian Sea at Thalangara. The Chandragiri Fort is built on its bank. The river originates at Pattimala in Kodagu (Coorg). The smallest river of Kerala is also in the district.

Rivers of Kasaragod
| Name | Origin | Navigable (km) | Total length (km) |
|---|---|---|---|
| Manjeshwaram | Kadandur hills | 16 | 3 |
| Uppala River | Kudipadi hills, Veerakamba | 50 | |
| Shiriya River | Kanakad hills, Anegundi Reserve Forest | 61 | 5 |
| Kumbla | Yedanad | 11 | 3 |
| Mogral River | Kanlur, Karadka Reserve Forest | 34 | |
| Chandragiri River | Patti forest, Talakaveri Wildlife Sanctuary | 105 | 13 |
| Kalnad | Chettianchal | 8 | |
| Bekal | Kaniyadka | 11 | |
| Chittari River | Kundiya | 25 | |
| Neeleshwaram River | Kinanoor, Talakaveri Wildlife Sanctuary | 47 | 11 |
| Kariangode River | Padinalkad, Coorg hills | 64 | 24 |
| Kavvayi Backwaters | Cheemeni | 23 | 10 |

== Administration ==
Municipalities

Kanhangad
Kasaragod
Nileshwaram

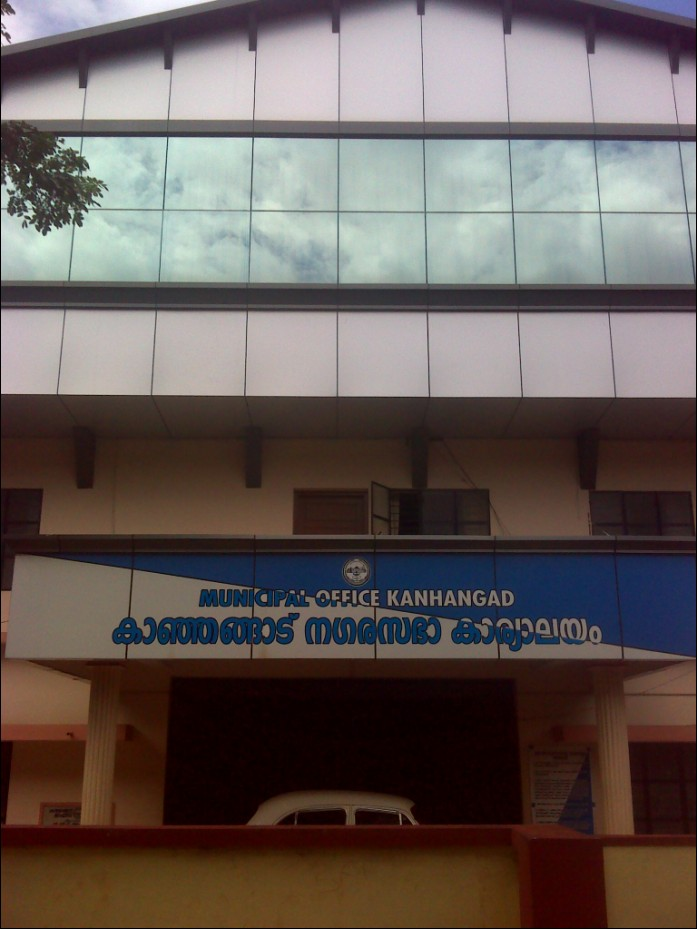
Kanhangad Municipal Office

The district administration is headed by the District Collector, and the incumbent collector is Inbasekar K IAS. Kasargod district consists of two revenue subdivisions- Kasargod and Kanhangad, each headed by a Revenue Divisional Officer (RDO). For land revenue administration, The district is further divided into 128 revenue villages which together form 4 taluks. For sake of rural administration, 38 Gram Panchayats are combined in 6 Blocks, which together form the Kasargod District Panchayat. For the sake of urban administration, 3 municipalities are there.

For the representation of Kasargod in Kerala Legislative Assembly, there are 5 assembly constituencies. These are included in the Kasaragod (Lok Sabha constituency). For rural governance, the Kasaragod District Panchayat functions at the apex level, with 6 block panchayats at the block level and 38 gram panchayats at the village level for local self-governance.

== Major Towns ==
The major towns of the district include:

- Manjeshwaram taluk: Manjeshwar, Uppala, Kumbla, Puthige, Paivalike, Vorkady, Meenja, Perla, Hosabettu, Thalapady
- Kasaragod taluk: Kasaragod, Mogral Puthur, Badiyadka, Cherkala, Bellur, Chattanchal
- Hosdurg taluk: Cheruvathur, Nileshwaram, Ajanur, Kanhangad, Udma, Pullur, Thrikaripur, Bekal, Pilicode
- Vellarikund taluk: Vellarikundu, Balal, Malom, Parappa, Panathur

=== Largest cities and towns ===
| Rank | Towns | Local Body | Population (2011) | Area in km^{2} | Density in km^{2} |
|---|---|---|---|---|---|
| 1 | Kanhangad | Municipality | 73,342 | 39.54 | 1854 |
| 2 | Kasaragod | Municipality | 54,172 | 16.7 | 3244 |
| 3 | Mangalpady | Panchayat | 48,441 | 36.3 | 1334 |
| 4 | Kumbla | Panchayat | 46,691 | 40.18 | 1162 |
| 5 | Manjeshwar | Panchayat | 41,515 | 24.4 | 1701 |
| 6 | Thrikaripur | Panchayat | 41,202 | 27.3 | 1509 |
| 7 | Nileshwaram | Municipality | 39,752 | 26.23 | 1515 |
| 8 | Udma | Panchayat | 37,537 | 23.54 | 1790 |
| 9 | Ajanur | Panchayat | 33,079 | 14.79 | 2237 |
| 10 | Cheruvathur | Panchayat | 27,435 | 18.37 | 1493 |

=== Revenue divisions ===
Manjeshwaram and Kasargod subdistricts (Taluks) are included in the Kasaragod revenue subdivision whereas the remaining two Taluks are included in the Kanhangad subdivision.

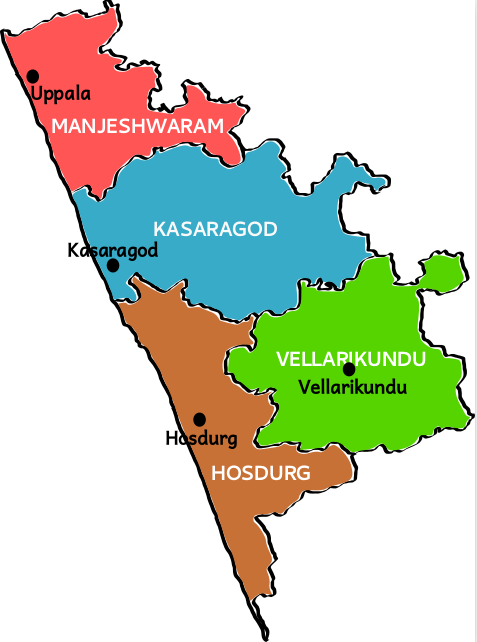
Taluks in Kasargod

| Subdistrict | Area (in km^{2}) | Population (2011) | Villages |
|---|---|---|---|
| Manjeshwaram | 382 | 268,642 | 48 |
| Kasargod | 594 | 413,094 | 34 |
| Vellarikundu | 547 | 177,157 | 15 |
| Hosdurg (Puthiya Kotta) | 442 | 448,484 | 31 |
Sources: 2011 Census of India, Official website of Kasargod district

== Political divisions ==
Local bodies in Kasaragod district

=== State legislature ===
| District | No. | Constituency | Name | Party | Alliance | Remarks |
|---|---|---|---|---|---|---|
| Kasaragod | 1 | Manjeshwaram | A. K. M. Ashraf | IUML | UDF | |
| Kasaragod | 2 | Kasaragod | N. A. Nellikkunnu | IUML | UDF | |
| Kasaragod | 3 | Udma | C. H. Kunhambu | CPI(M) | LDF | |
| Kasaragod | 4 | Kanhangad | E. Chandrasekharan | CPI | LDF | |
| Kasaragod | 5 | Thrikaripur | M. Rajagopal | CPI(M) | LDF | |

=== Parliament ===
| Parliamentary Constituency | Political party | Political coalition | Elected Representative |
|---|---|---|---|
| Kasaragod | INC | UDF | Rajmohan Unnithan |

== Transport ==
Kasaragod railway station lies on Mangalore-Shoranur railway line in Palakkad railway division.

The National Highway 66 which connects the western coast of India from Mumbai to Kanyakumari passes through coastal area of the district connecting the major coastal towns of Manjeshwar, Uppala, Kumbla, Kasaragod, Udma, Bekal, Kanhangad, Nileshwaram, and Thrikaripur. It enters the district at Thalappady and goes out through Payyanur. There are State highways starting/ending at Kasaragod and Kanhangad. Total length of Major District Road (MDR) is around 1460 km and it accounts for around 11.2 km of MDR for every 10,000 people in the district. The Kerala State Road Transport Corporation (KSRTC) has stations to operate its service in the district. The railway goes through coastal area. Kasaragod railway station lies in Palakkad railway division of southern zone on Mangalore-Shoranur line. Kasaragod district is home to 3 out of 13 minor ports in Kerala- Manjeshwar, Kasaragod, and Nileshwaram. The nearest international airports are situated at Mangalore (65 km away) and Kannur (110 km away).

== Demographics ==
Historical population
| Year | Pop. | ±% p.a. |
|---|---|---|
| 1901 | 231,280 | — |
| 1911 | 247,467 | +0.68% |
| 1921 | 256,931 | +0.38% |
| 1931 | 302,043 | +1.63% |
| 1941 | 342,301 | +1.26% |
| 1951 | 411,031 | +1.85% |
| 1961 | 512,146 | +2.22% |
| 1971 | 683,020 | +2.92% |
| 1981 | 872,741 | +2.48% |
| 1991 | 1,071,508 | +2.07% |
| 2001 | 1,204,078 | +1.17% |
| 2011 | 1,307,375 | +0.83% |
| 2018 | 1,390,894 | +0.89% |

Religions in Kasaragod district (2011)
| Religion | Percent |
| Hinduism | 55.84% |
| Islam | 37.24% |
| Christianity | 6.69% |
| Other or not stated | 0.23% |

According to the 2018 Vital Statistics published by the Government of Kerala, Kasargod district has a population of 1,390,894, roughly equal to the nation of Trinidad and Tobago or the US state of New Hampshire. The 2011 Census of India, gives the district a ranking of 375th in India (out of a total of 640). The district has a population density of 654 inhabitants per square kilometre (1,690/sq mi). Its population growth rate over the decade 2001–2011 was 8.18%. Kasaragod has a sex ratio of 1080 females for every 1000 males, and a literacy rate of 90.09%. Scheduled Castes and Scheduled Tribes make up 4.08% and 3.74% of the population respectively. The Kerala Tulu Academy, which promotes Tulu language and literature, is functioned at Hosangadi in district.

Languages of Kasaragod district (2011)
1. Malayalam (82.7%)
2. Tulu (8.77%)
3. Kannada (4.23%)
4. Marathi (1.76%)
5. Konkani (1.29%)
6. Others (1.26%)

Kasaragod district majorly consists of Malayalam speakers who form 82.69% of the population. Tulu and Kannada speakers concentrated in the northern parts of the district like Manjeshwar, Uppala, Enmakaje, Badiyadka, Kumbla and Seethangoli form a significant linguistic minority with 8.77% and 4.23% each.

=== Religion (Taluk-wise, 2011 Census) ===
As per the 2011 Census of India, when Kasaragod district comprised only two taluks (Kasaragod and Hosdurg), the taluk-wise religious composition was as follows:

| Taluk | Hindu (%) | Muslim (%) | Christian (%) | Others / Not stated (%) |
|---|---|---|---|---|
| Kasaragod | 48.84 | 48.15 | 2.82 | 0.19 |
| Hosdurg | 63.46 | 25.36 | 10.90 | 0.29 |

- Note: At the time of the 2011 Census, Kasaragod district comprised only two taluks — Kasaragod and Hosdurg. The taluks of Manjeshwaram and Vellarikundu were created in 2013 by bifurcating the earlier taluks; religion-wise 2011 data for these new taluks are not available in aggregated form.

== Education ==
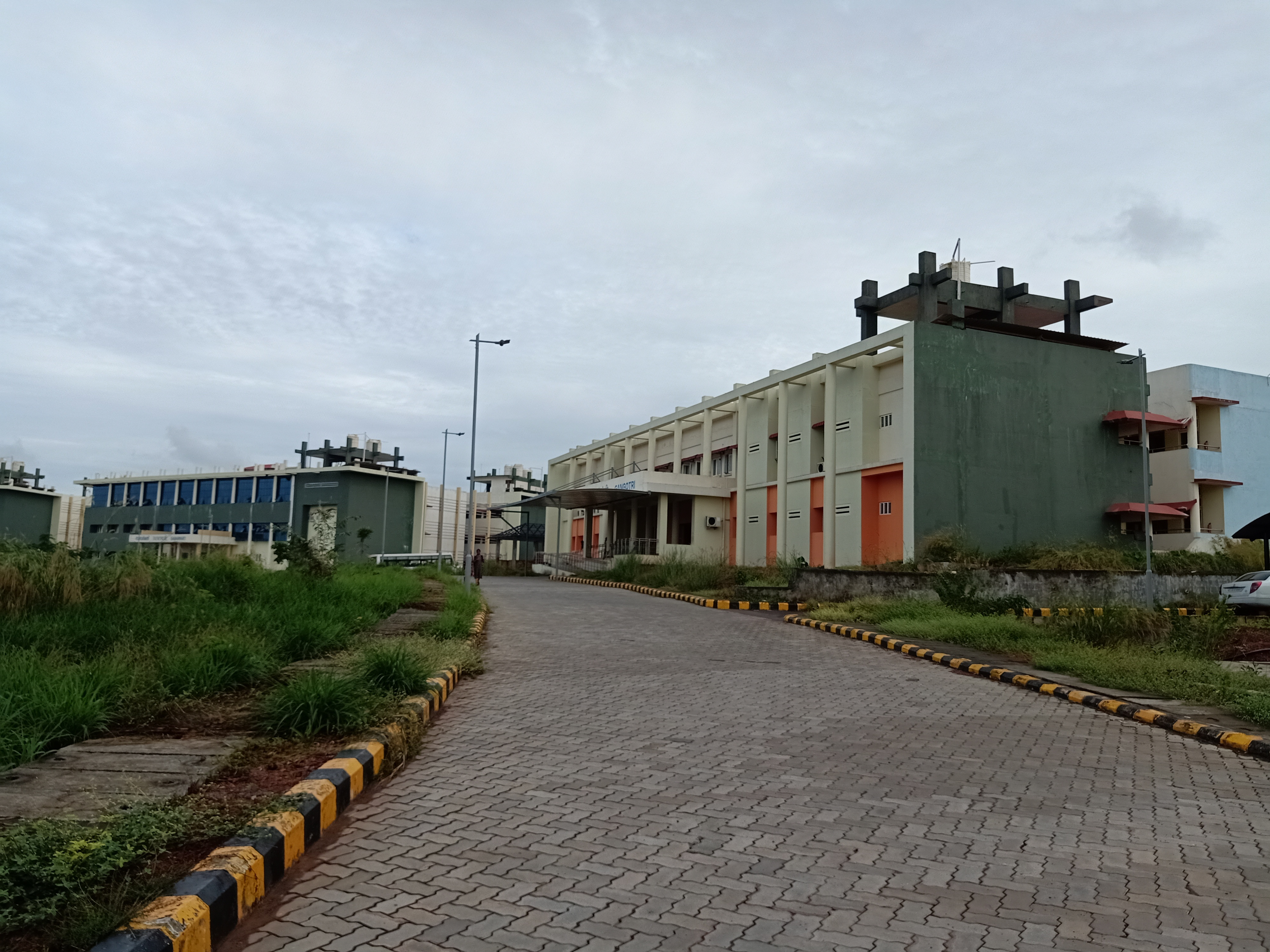
The Central University of Kerala is situated in the district.

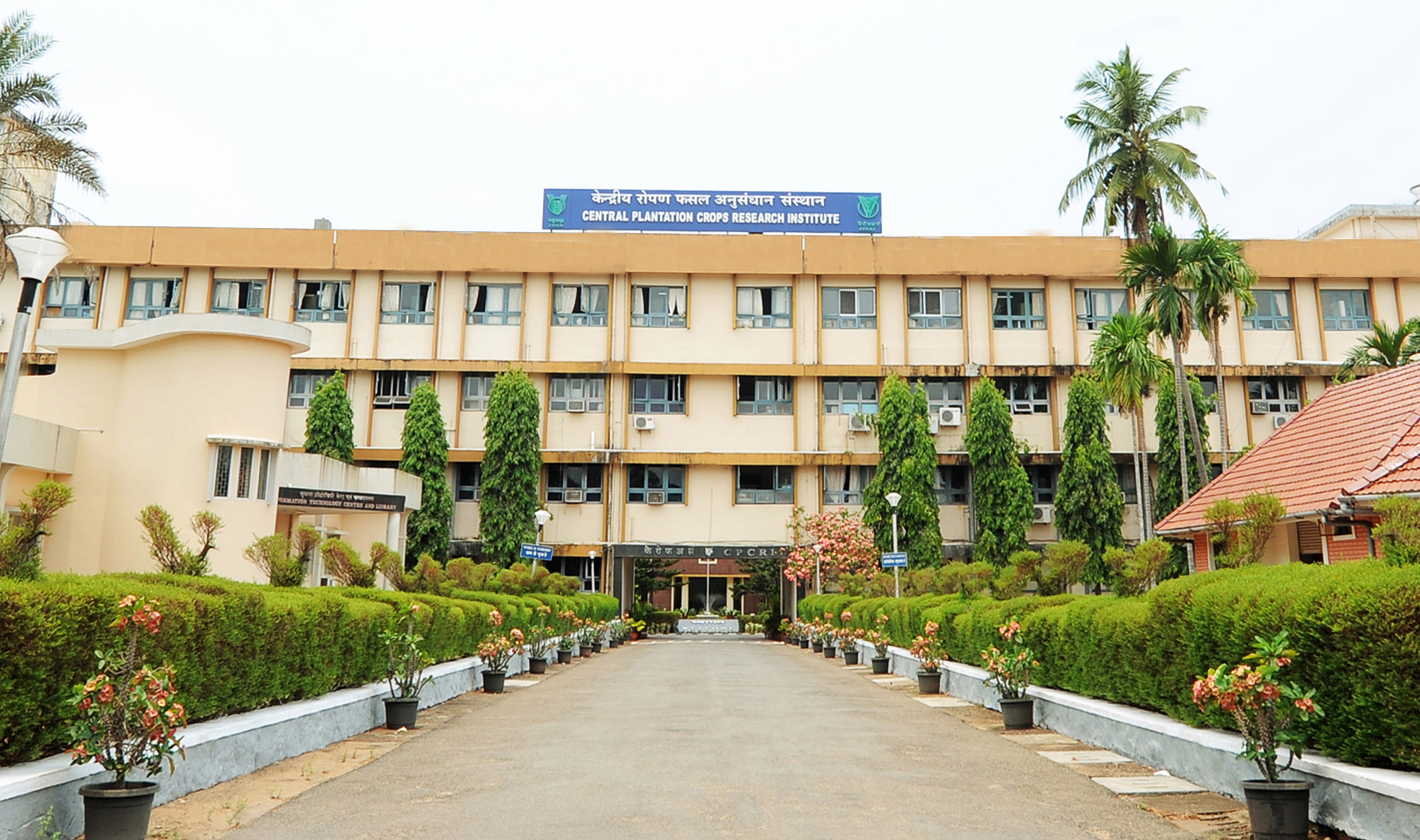
The Central Plantation Crops Research Institute at Kasaragod was established in 1916.

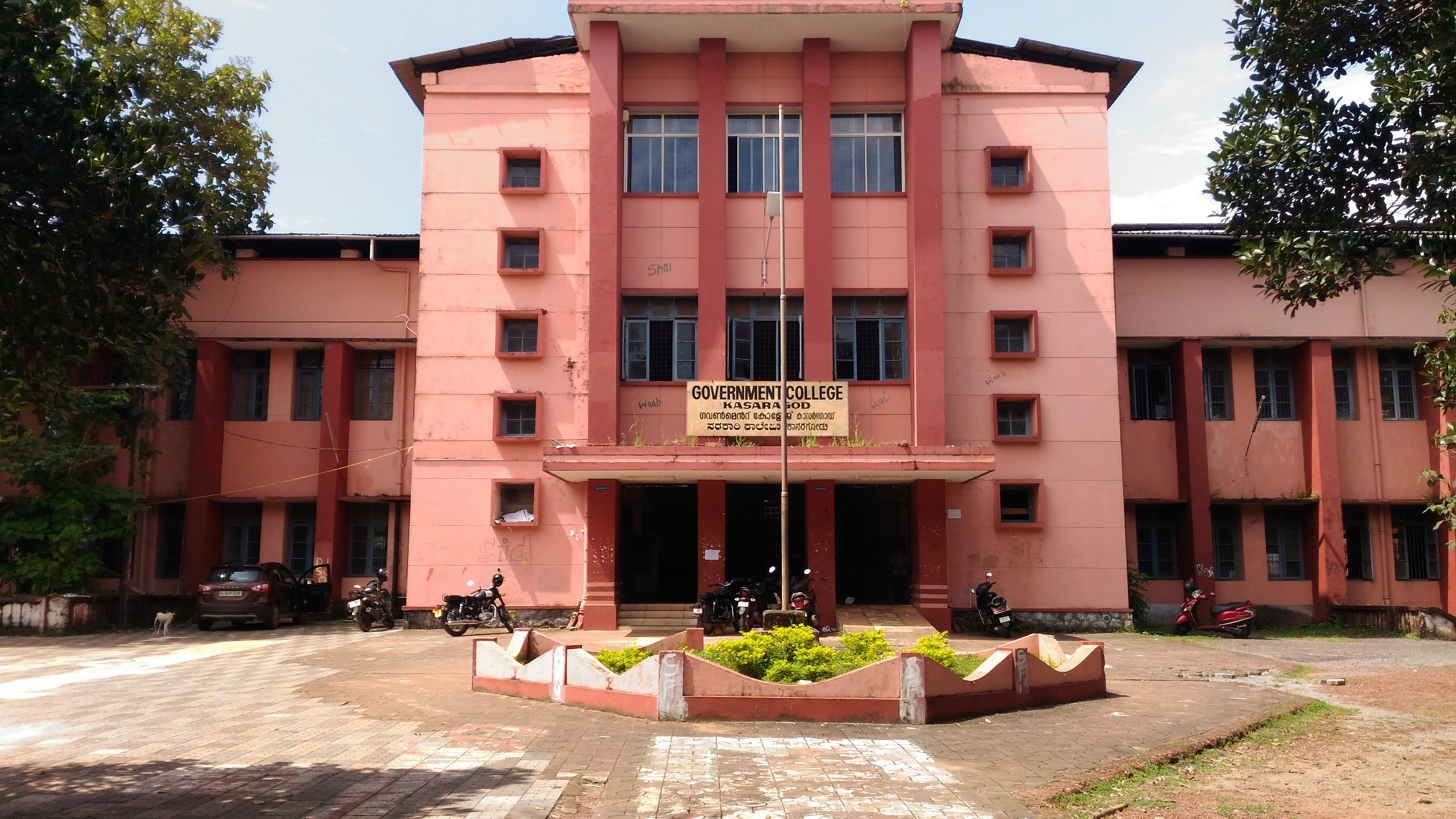
The Government College Kasaragod was established in 1957.

Kasargod district comes under the jurisdiction of Kannur University.

- Central Plantation Crops Research Institute at Kasaragod was established in 1916.
- Central University of Kerala was established in 2009.
- Government College Kasaragod was established in 1957.

== Development ==
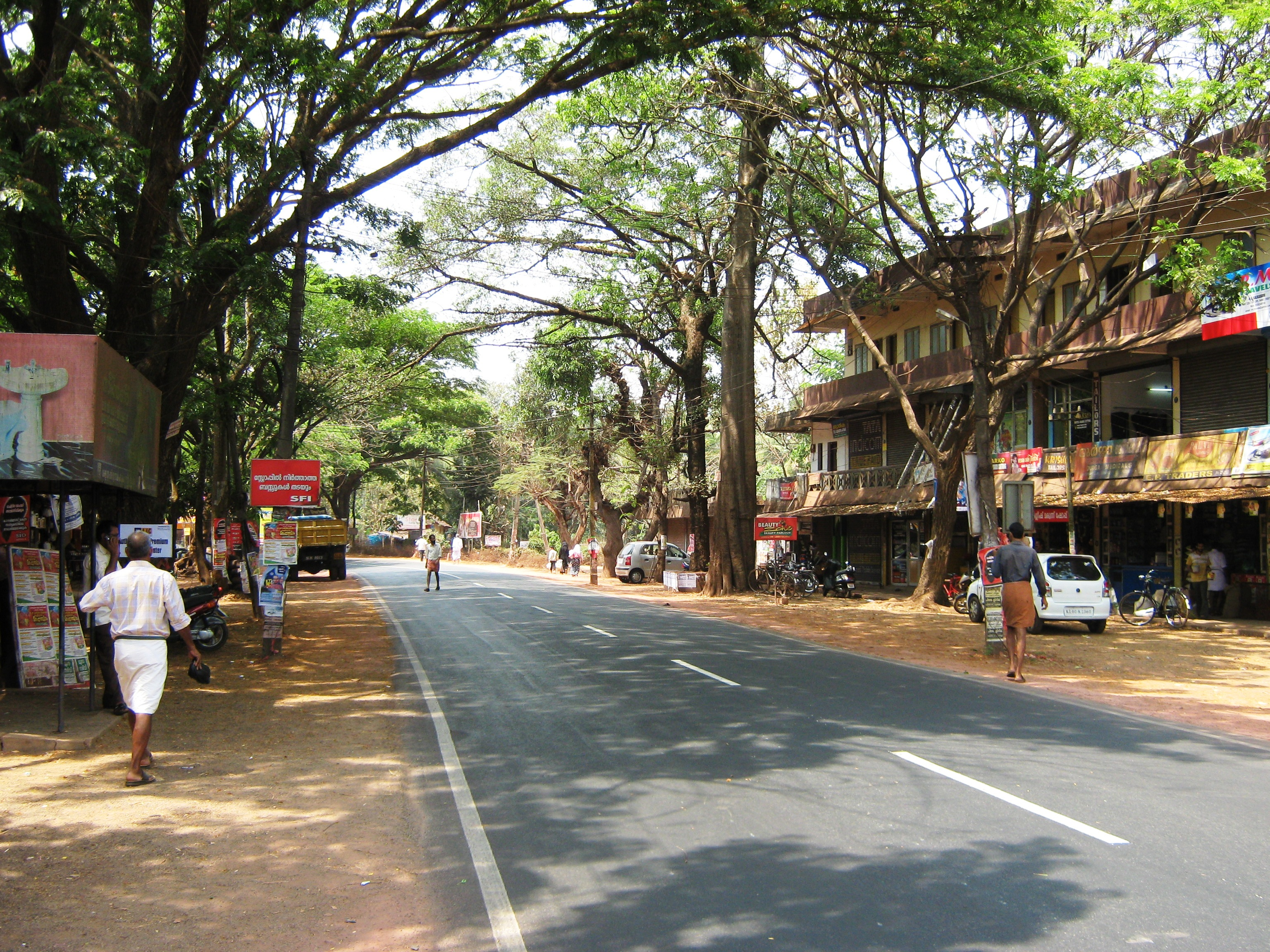
Thrikaripur town

Kasaragod district is the northernmost district of Kerala, which is far away from Thiruvananthapuram, the state headquarters, which is located in the southernmost tip of state. Manjeshwaram town is located about 600 km north of the state headquarters Thiruvananthapuram, about 30 km south of Mangalore, about 350 km west of Bangalore, the headquarters of the neighbouring state Karnataka, and about 950 km south of Mumbai city. In 2012, the Second Oommen Chandy ministry appointed a commission under the leadership of the former Chief Secretary P. Prabhakaran to study about the backwardness and issues faced by this northernmost district of Kerala and to draw up a special package for the district. In 2013, two more taluks, namely Manjeshwaram and Vellarikundu were formed in the district. Before it the district had only two Taluks. The decision to implement a gas-based powerplant at Cheemeni was taken by the second Chandy government. A government medical college was allowed for Kasaragod district, as a part of the government's new policy to establish at ensure availability of at least one Government Medical College in all the 14 districts of the state in 2013.

== Tourism ==
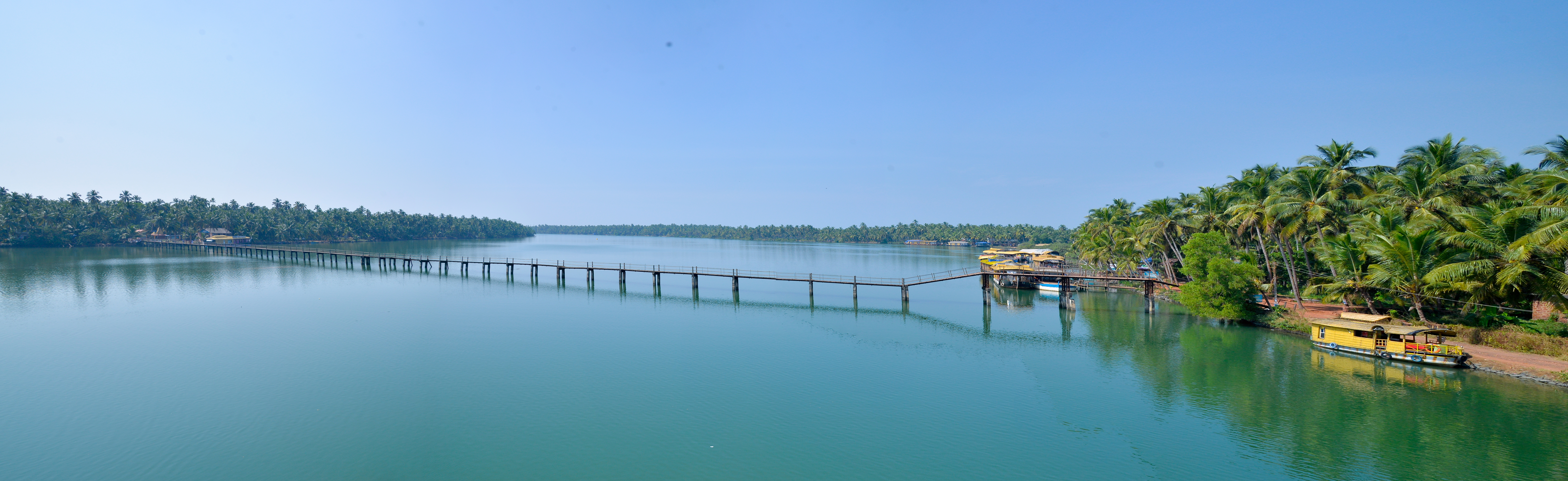
Kottappuram walking bridge, Nileshwar

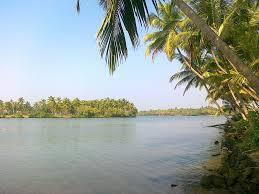
Edayilakkad island in Valiyaparamba

- Ananthapuram Lake Temple
- Arikady fort
- Bekal Fort
- Chandragiri Fort
- Edayilakkad Island
- Kanwatheertha beach
- Kappil beach
- Kottanchery hills
- Malik Dinar Mosque
- Mayipady palace
- Nileshwaram Estuary beach.
- Our Lady of Sorrows Church
- Pallikkara beach
- Manjeshwaram beach
- Ranipuram Hill Station
- Valiyaparamba Island
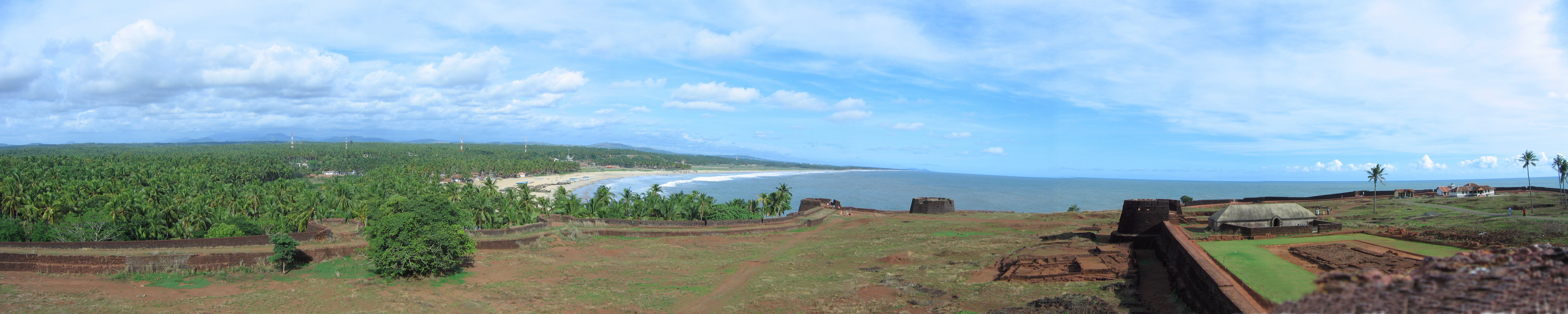
Panoramic view from inside Bekal Fort

== Notable people ==
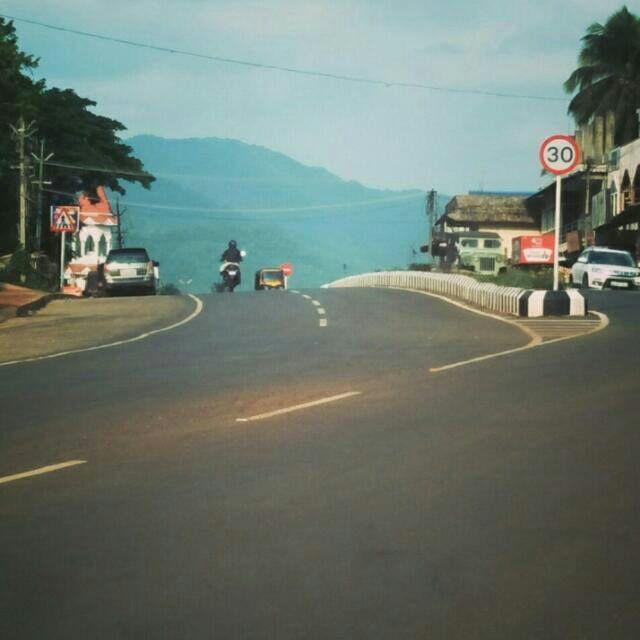
Panathur is an important hilly town in the district (Closer to Western Ghats)

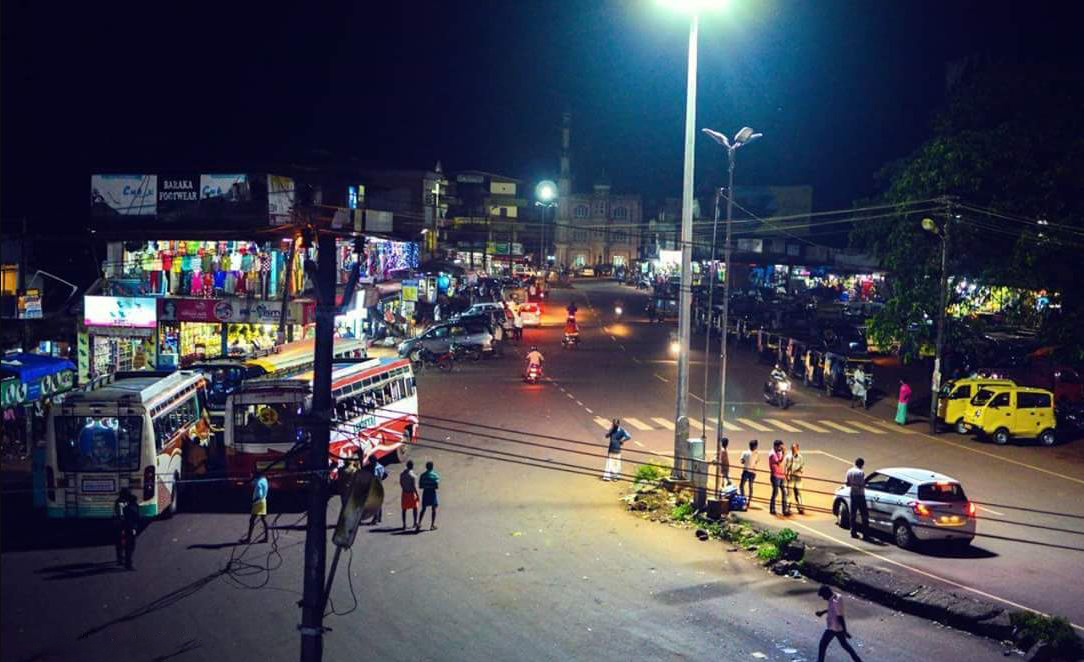
Badiyadka town during night

- C. V. Balakrishnan - Malayalam Writer
- Ambikasuthan Mangad - Malayalam Writer
- Anil Kumble - Indian Cricketer
- Arya - Indian Actor
- Asif Kottayil - Indian Footballer
- BR Shenoy - Indian Economist
- DK Chowta - Indian Businessman
- E Chandrasekharan- Ex. Minister of Kerala
- KK Venugopal - Attorney General of India
- Kanayi Kunhiraman - Indian Sculptor
- Kavya Madhavan - Film Actress
- KK Rai - Independence activist
- Kesavananda Bharati - Hindu Monk
- Mahima Nambiar - Film Actress
- Mirshad Michu - Indian Footballer
- Mohammed Rafi - Indian Footballer
- Mohammed Azharuddeen - Indian Cricketer
- P Kunhiraman Nair - Malayalam Poet
- Prakash Bare - Film Actor
- PP Kumari - Indian Materials Scientist
- Roopesh Shetty - Film Actor, RJ & Model
- Santhosh Echikkanam - Malayalam Writer
- Sara Aboobacker - Kannada Writer
- Sathya - Fil Actor
- Vysakh - Malayalam Film Director

== Localities ==
- Athinhal
- Bekal
- Kanhangad
- Kasaragod North
- Kodoth
- Kumbla
- Kunjar
- Manjeshwar
- Mavilakadappuram
- Nileshwaram
- Periyanganam
- Thrikaripur

== See also ==
- Kolathunadu
