= Thalappady, Kasaragod =

Coordinates: 12.747569°N 74.888722°E

Thalappady is a village in Kasaragod district of the Indian state of Kerala. The Kunjathur Mahalingeshwara temple is located in Thalappady.

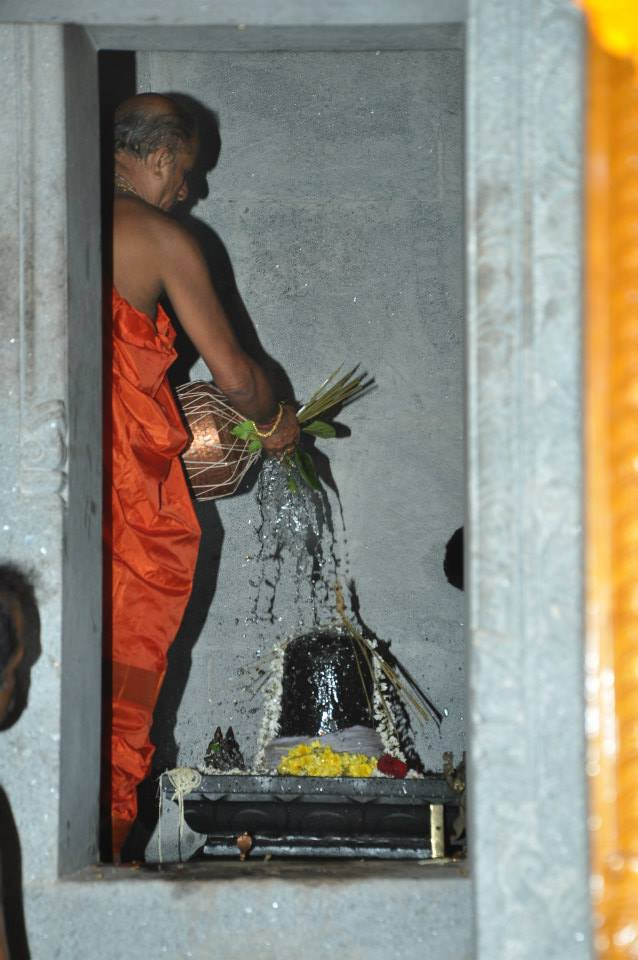
Mahalingeshwara Temple

== Location ==
Thalappady is the northernmost village in Kerala in NH 66. While traveling from Kasaragod to Mangalore, Thalappady is the last village in Kerala. It is one kilometre from Kunjathur town. It is located 20 km from Mangalore, 30km from Kasarakod, 600km from Thiruvanathapuram and 700 km from Kanyakumari. There are check posts of Kerala and Karnataka states in this village. After the check posts, there is another village called Talapady in Karnataka state.

== Access ==
Thalappady is located on the Kerala-Karnataka border. It is 30 km from Kasaragod and one km from Manjeshwaram. The village is 586 km from the state capital Thiruvananthapuram. Mangalore is only 24 km from Manjeshwar.

== Post office ==
Thalappady has a post office and the pin code is 671323.

== Administration ==
Thalappady is part of Manjeshwaram Taluk. It comes under the Manjeshwaram grama panchayath.

== Schools ==
- Udhaya Highschool, Manjeshwar
- Govt VHSS, Kunjathur
- Government High School, Bengra Manjeshwar.
- Sirajul Hudha School, Manjeshwar.

== Transportation ==
The nearest railway station is Manjeshwar at a distance of 2 km. Thokottu railway station is 14 km away.
