= Manjeshwar =

- Town
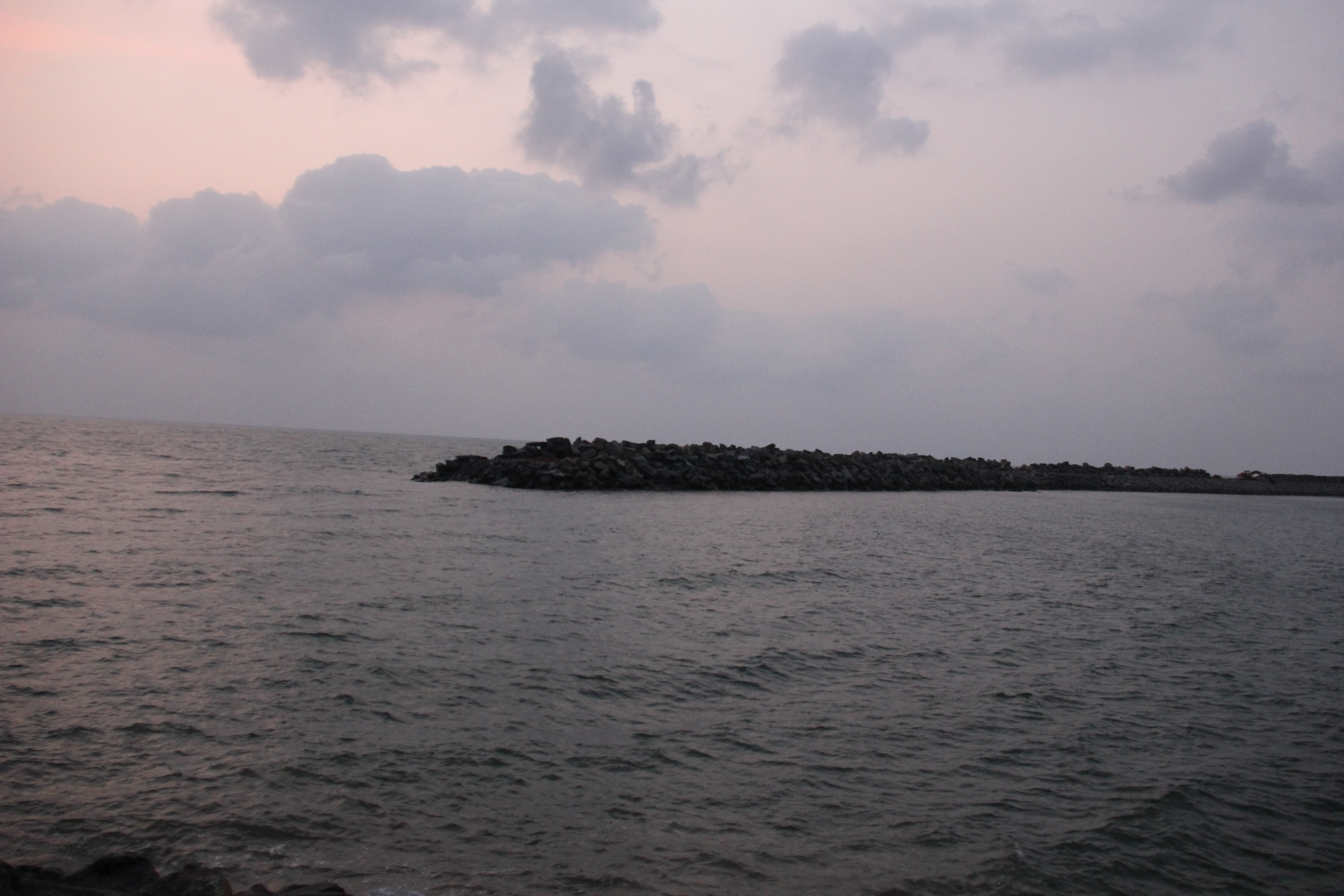
- Manjeshwar harbour

- Location in Kerala, India Manjeshwar (India)
- Coordinates: 12°43′27″N 74°52′27″E
- Country: India
- State: Kerala
- District: Kasaragod
- Taluk: Manjeshwaram
- Named for: Manjula Kshetra

Government
  - Body: Grama Panchayat

Area
  - Total: 24.40 km^{2} (9.42 sq mi)

Population (2011)
  - Total: 41,515
  - Density: 1,701/km^{2} (4,407/sq mi)

Languages
  - Official: Malayalam, Kannada, English
- Time zone: UTC+5:30 (IST)
- PIN: 671323
- Telephone code: 4998
- Vehicle registration: KL-14

Manjeshwar or Manjeshwaram is a coastal town and a minor port in Kasaragod district at the northern tip of Kerala. It is situated at a distance of 30 kilometres (20 mi) north of the district headquarters Kasaragod and 20 kilometres (10 mi) south of Mangalore city in Karnataka state. Thalappady is the northern border of Kerala, situated near Manjeshwaram town.

== Etymology ==
Manjeshwar is named after Sri Manjarisha or Srimath Anantheshwara of the sacred Manjeshwar Temple.

== Demographics ==
The Manjeshwar Census Town (CT) has an area of 3.98 km^{2}. As of 2011, it had a population of 8,742.

The population of children aged 0-6 was 1149, which was 13.14% of the total population of Manjeshwar (CT). The literacy rate of Manjeshwar was 92.91%, which is lower than the state average of 94.00%.

== Religions ==
As per 2011 census report, the Manjeshwar Census Town had a total population of 8,742 among which 5,827 were Muslims (66.7%), 2,742 were Hindus (31.4%), 165 were Christians (1.9%), 28 people did not state their religion (0.3%) with 4 marked "other.

Year	Male	Female	Total Population	Change	Religion (%)							
Year	Male	Female	Total Population	Change	Hindu	Muslim	Christian	Sikhs	Buddhist	Jain	Other religions	Religion not stated
2001	8675	4285	4417	-	33.98	61.72	4.25	0	0	0	0	0.05
2011	8742	4178	4564	+0.77%	31.37	66.66	1.89	0.01	0	0	0	0.08

== Education ==
- Govinda Pai College, Manjeshwar
- Govt. High School, Bangra Manjeshwar

== Health ==
Manjeshwar is one of the areas with large number of HIV patients. 970 HIV cases were registered in Kasaragod district. Ten HIV deaths were reported from Kasaragod district within a short period of two months in 2016. There is no special facility or doctors for HIV patients in this area. HIV affected areas in Kasaragod include Dharmathadka, Nileshwaram, Manjeshwar, Bandiyod, Vellarikundu, Kasaragod town and Padannakkad.

== See also ==
- Uppala
- Kaliyoor, Kasaragod
- Kunjathur
- Manjeshwar railway station
- Badaje
