= Bekoor =

- village
- Location in Kerala, India Bekoor (India)
- Coordinates: 12.6834800°N 74.948340°E
- Country: India
- State: Kerala
- District: Kasaragod
- Taluk: Manjeshwaram

Languages
  - Official: Malayalam, Kannada
- Time zone: UTC+5:30 (IST)
- PIN: 6XXXXX
- Vehicle registration: KL-

Bekoor is a village near Uppala town in the Kasaragod district in the state of Kerala, India. It is located in eastern Uppala, on the Uppala-Bayar road, which connects Uppala with Paivalike and Bayar, and leads to Kanyana, Vittal, and Puttur in the Dakshina Kannada district, Karnataka. It is around 3 km from Kaikamba Junction and 1 km from Sonkal.

== Transportation ==
Local roads have access to National Highway No.66 which connects to Mangalore in the north and Calicut in the south. The nearest railway station is uppala railway station on Mangalore-Palakkad line. There is an airport at Mangalore.

== Languages ==
This locality is an essentially multi-lingual region. The people speak Malayalam, Tulu Language, Beary bashe and Konkani. Migrant workers also speak Hindi and Tamil languages.

== Administration ==
This village is part of Manjeswaram assembly constituency which is again part of Kasaragod (Lok Sabha constituency)
