= Uppala-Bayar =

Highway in India

Route information
- Length: 22 km (14 mi)

Major junctions
- From: Uppala, Kerala
- NH 66 in Uppala.
- To: Kanyana, Karnataka

Location
- Country: India
- States: Kerala: 22 km (14 mi)
- Primary destinations: Sonkal - Bekoor - Kubanoor - Paivalike - Bayar

Highway system
- Roads in India; Expressways; National; State; Asian

Uppala-Bayar-Kanyana road is the highway connecting Uppala with Bekoor, Kubanoor, Paivalike, Bayar and leads to Kanyana, Vittal, and Puttur in Dakshina kannada district, Karnataka.
