= Dharmathadka =

- Village
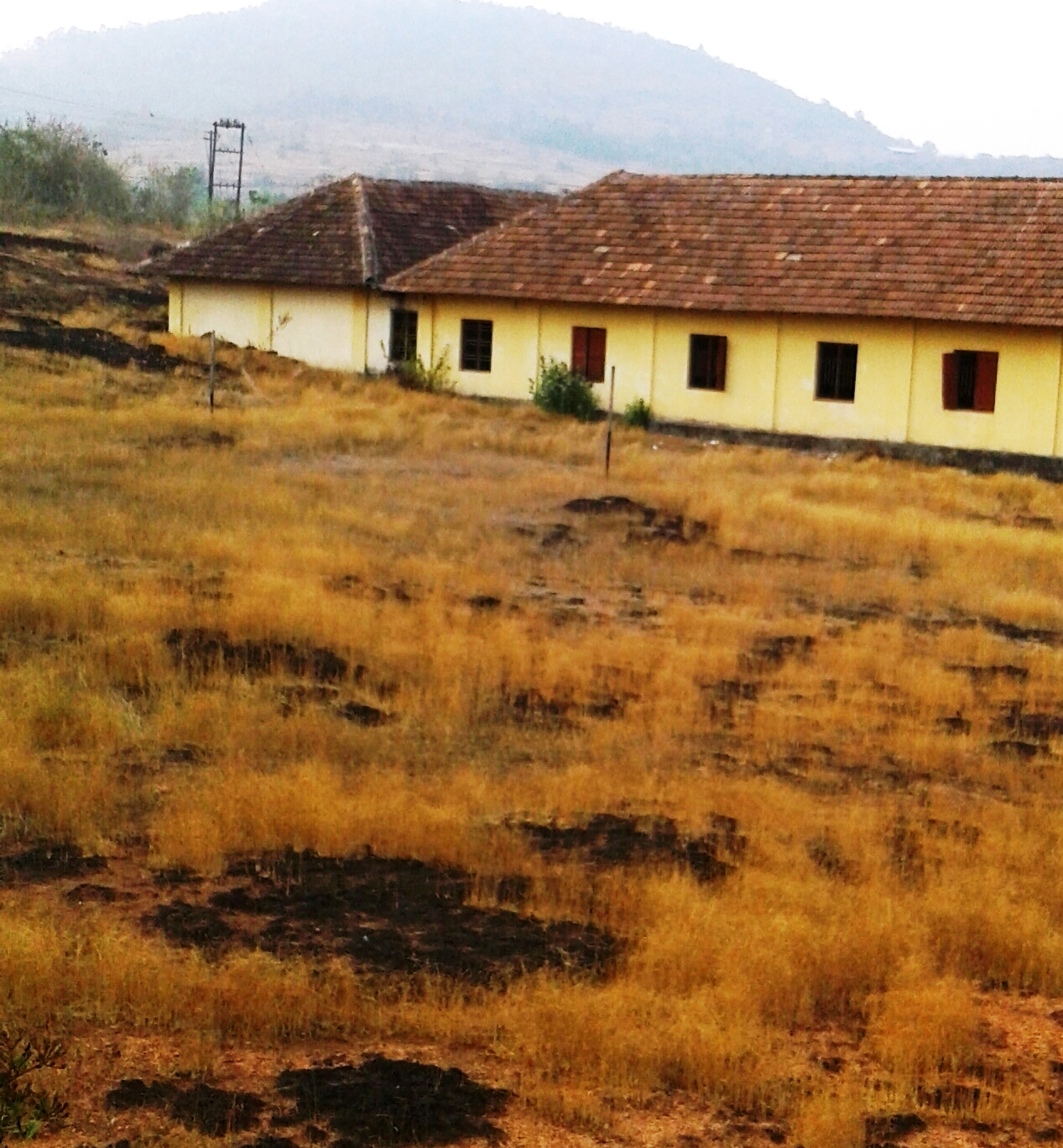
- Dharmathadka School

- Location in Kerala, India Dharmathadka (India)
- Coordinates: 12°39′0″N 75°1′0″E
- Country: India
- State: Kerala
- District: Kasaragod
- Taluk: Manjeshwaram

Languages
  - Official: Malayalam, English
- Time zone: UTC+5:30 (IST)
- Vehicle registration: KL-14

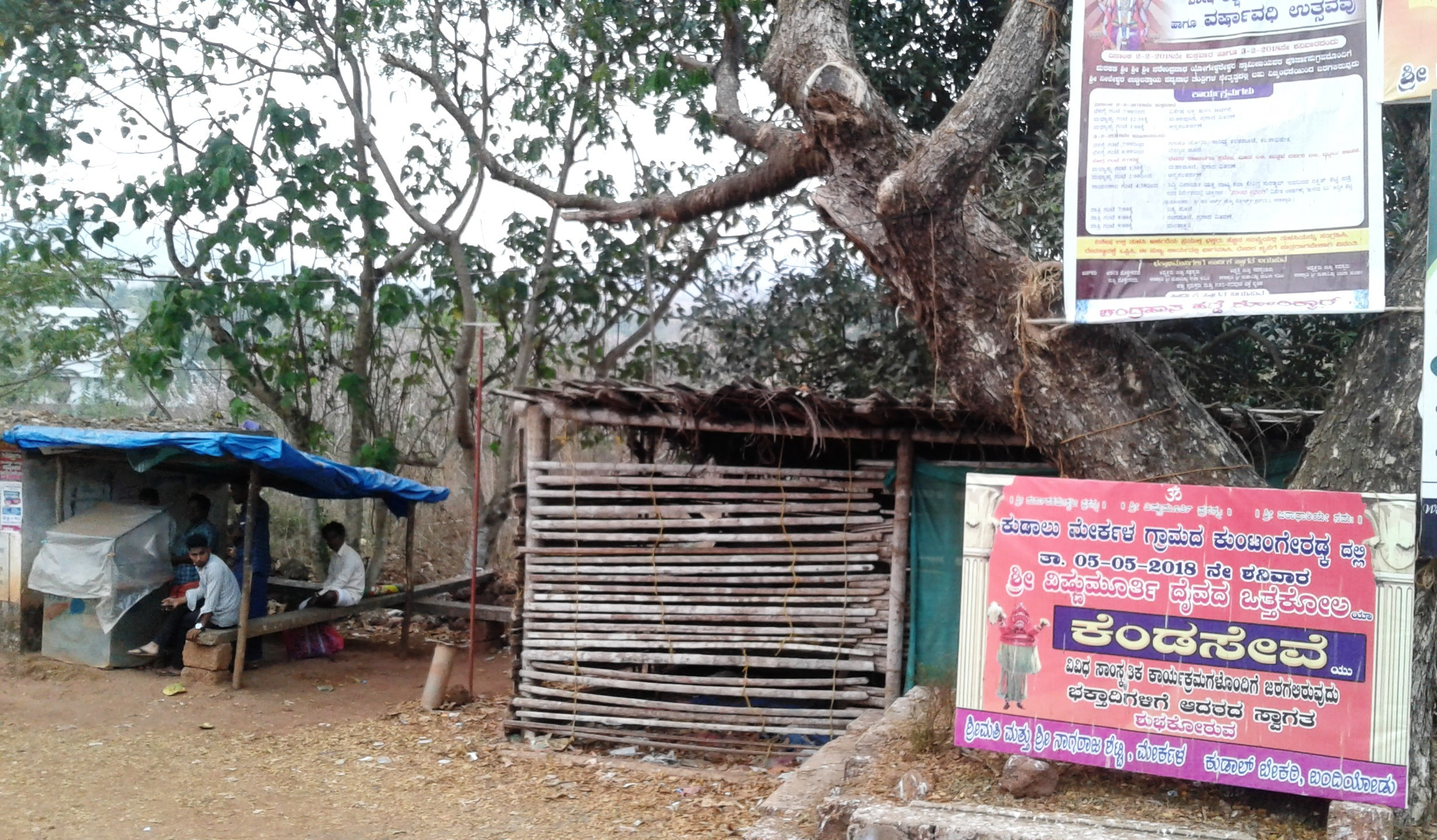
Permude Junction, Dharmathadka

Dharmathadka is a small village in Kasaragod district of Kerala state, India.

== Location ==
Dharmathadka is 30 km north-east of Kasaragod town.

== Tourism ==
Posadigumpe mountain in Dharmathadka which is an ideal picnic centre and tourist resort located on a hillock 487.68 metres above sea level in Dharmathadka. From the hill top one can see the Arabian Sea, Manglore, Kudremukh, etc.

== Transportation ==
Local roads have access to National Highway No.66 which connects to Mangalore in the north and Calicut in the south. The nearest railway station is Manjeshwar on Mangalore-Palakkad line. There is an airport at Mangalore.

== Languages ==
This locality is multi-lingual. The people speak Malayalam, Kannada, Tulu, Beary bashe and Konkani. Migrant workers also speak Hindi and Tamil languages. This village is part of Manjeswaram assembly constituency which is again part of Kasaragod (Lok Sabha constituency)

== Health ==
Dharmathadka is one of the areas with large number of HIV patients. 970 HIV cases were registered in Kasaragod district. Ten HIV deaths were reported from Kasaragod district within a short period of two months in 2016. There is no special facility or doctors for HIV patients in this area. HIV affected areas in Kasaragod include Nileshwaram, Manjeshwar, Bhandiyod, Vellarikundu, Kasaragod town and Padannakkad.

== Image gallery ==
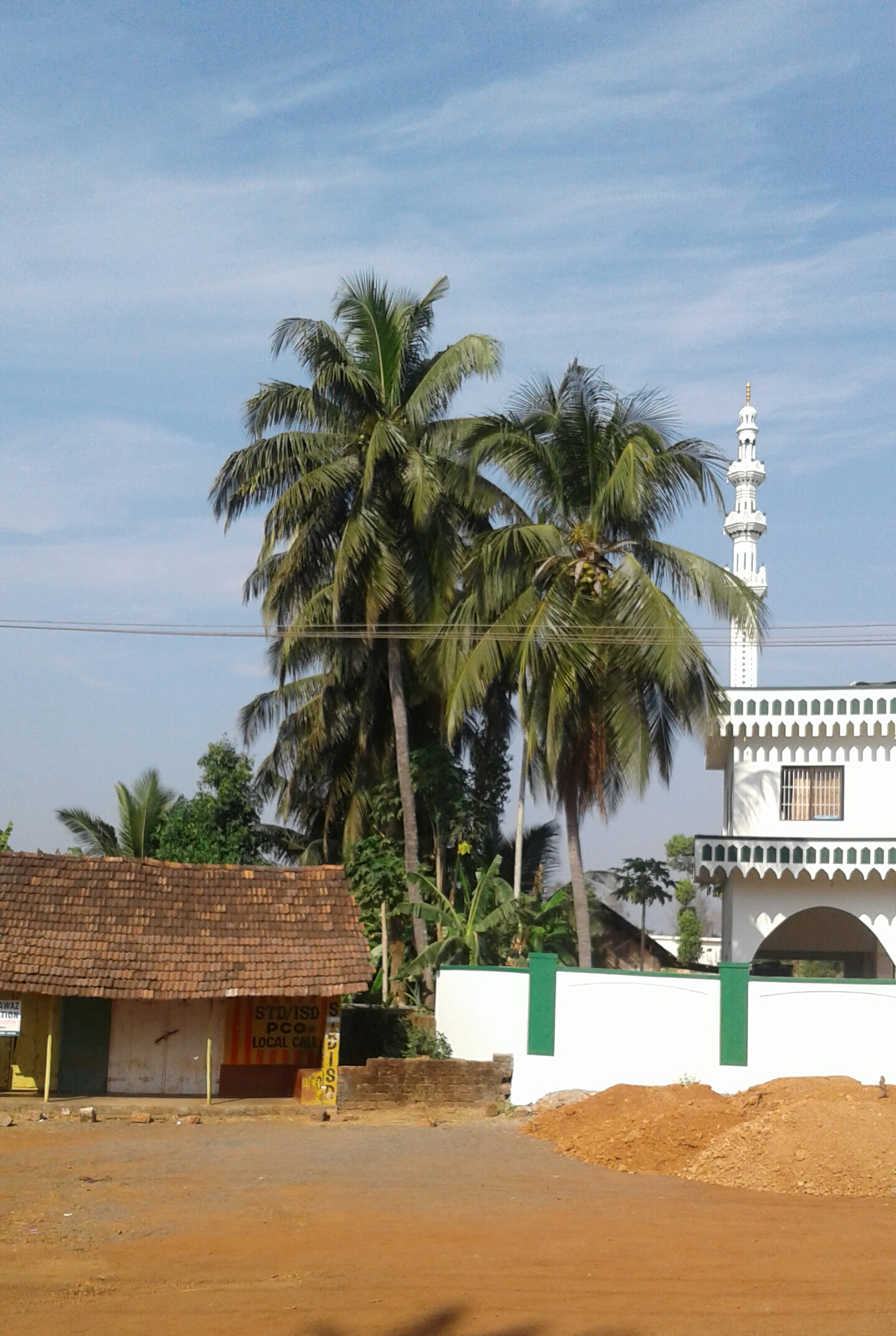
Chevar

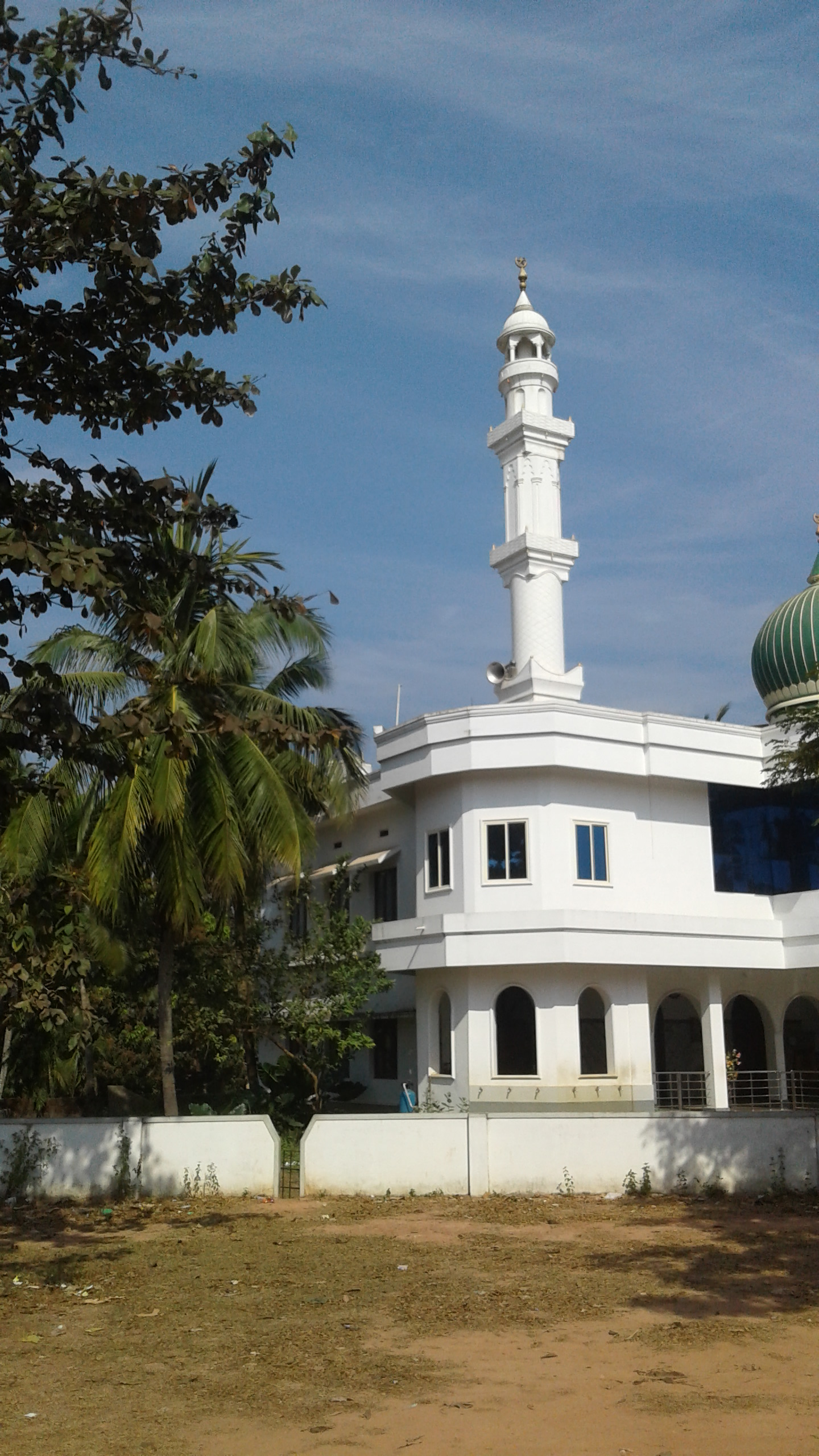
Adka
