= Kubanoor =

- village
- Location in Kerala, India Kubanoor (India)
- Coordinates: 12.6640974°N 74.9488941°E
- Country: India
- State: Kerala
- District: Kasaragod
- Taluk: Manjeshwaram

Languages
  - Official: Malayalam, English
- Time zone: UTC+5:30 (IST)
- PIN: 6XXXXX
- Vehicle registration: KL-

Kubanoor is a village near Uppala in Kasaragod district in the state of Kerala, India.

== Location ==
It is located around 3 km from Kaikamba junction in Uppala-Bayar road.

== Languages ==
This locality is an essentially multi-lingual region. The people speak Malayalam, Tulu, Beary bashe and Konkani. Migrant workers also speak Hindi and Tamil languages.

== Administration ==
This village is part of Manjeswaram assembly constituency which is again part of Kasaragod (Lok Sabha constituency)

== Transportation ==
Local roads have access to National Highway No.66 which connects to Mangalore in the north and Calicut in the south. The nearest railway station is Manjeshwar on Mangalore-Palakkad line. There is an airport at Mangalore.
