= Posadigumpe =

Posadigumpe ( പൊസഡി ഗുംപെ) is a monolith hillock in Manjeshwaram taluk of Kasargod district of Kerala state, south India at an altitude of 1060ft and is the northern most point in state which is above 1000ft from msl. It also has a point that is part of Great Trigonometrical Survey.

== Tourism ==
Posadigumpe is a picnic spot and tourist resort located on a hillock 487.68 metres above sea level near Bayar village, 30 km north-east of Kasaragod which is promoted by DTPC Kasaragod under Kerala Tourism. It is proposed to develop the hill as a tourist attraction. From the hill top one can see the Arabian Sea, Mangalore and Kudremukh. The place is accessible from NH 17 via Bandyodu or Uppala.

== Languages ==
This locality is an essentially multi-lingual region. Malayalam and Tulu are main language here. The people here also speak Havyaka, Byari, Konkani, Kannada languages.

== Administration ==
This village is part of Manjeshwar Assembly constituency which is again part of Kasaragod (Lok Sabha constituency) and is part of Kasaragod district of Kerala.

== Transportation ==
It is situated between Paivalike and Seethangoli on Hill Highway and local roads have access to National Highway No.66 at Uppala, Kumbla and Kasaragod. The nearest railway station is Kumbla in Shoranur–Mangalore section which is 23 km away. Nearest airports are Mangalore (55 kms) and Kannur International Airport (136 kms).
