= Hidayath Nagar =

Village in Kerala, India

Hidayath Nagar is a small town in Uppala, a town in Kasaragod district, Kerala. It is located about 1 kilometre (0.62 mi) north of the main junction in Uppala.

== Transportation ==
Local roads have access to National Highway No.66 which connects to Mangalore in the north and Calicut in the south. The nearest railway station is thalanga railway station and Manjeshwar on Mangalore-Palakkad line. There is an airport at Mangalore.

== Languages ==
This locality is an essentially multi-lingual region. The people speak Malayalam, Kannada, Tulu, Beary bashe and Konkani. Migrant workers also speak Hindi and Tamil languages. This village is part of Manjeswaram assembly constituency which is again part of Kasaragod (Lok Sabha constituency)
