= Sonkal =

Residential location in Uppala, Kerala, India

Sonkal is a small local residential location in Uppala, in Kasaragod district, Kerala.

== Transportation ==
Sonkal can be reached by turning east sfrom Kaikamba junction in Uppala. Navy street and Shanthigiri are the nearby villages. Obrala village near Sonkal is famous for Duff music. Local roads have access to National Highway No.66 which connects to Mangalore in the north and Calicut in the south. The nearest railway station is Manjeshwar on Mangalore-Palakkad line. There is an airport at Mangalore.

== Languages ==
This locality is an essentially multi-lingual region. The people speak Malayalam, Kannada, Tulu, Beary bashe and Konkani. Migrant workers also speak Hindi and Tamil languages.

== Administration ==
This village is part of Manjeswaram assembly constituency which is again part of Kasaragod (Lok Sabha constituency)

- List of Cities and Towns in Kasaragod district
