= Bandiyod =

Town in Kasaragod district, Kerala, India

Coordinates: 12.640°N 74.928°E

Bandiyod (formerly Badoor Kaikamba) is a small town in the Kasaragod district of Kerala, India. It is located midway between Mangalore and Kasaragod.

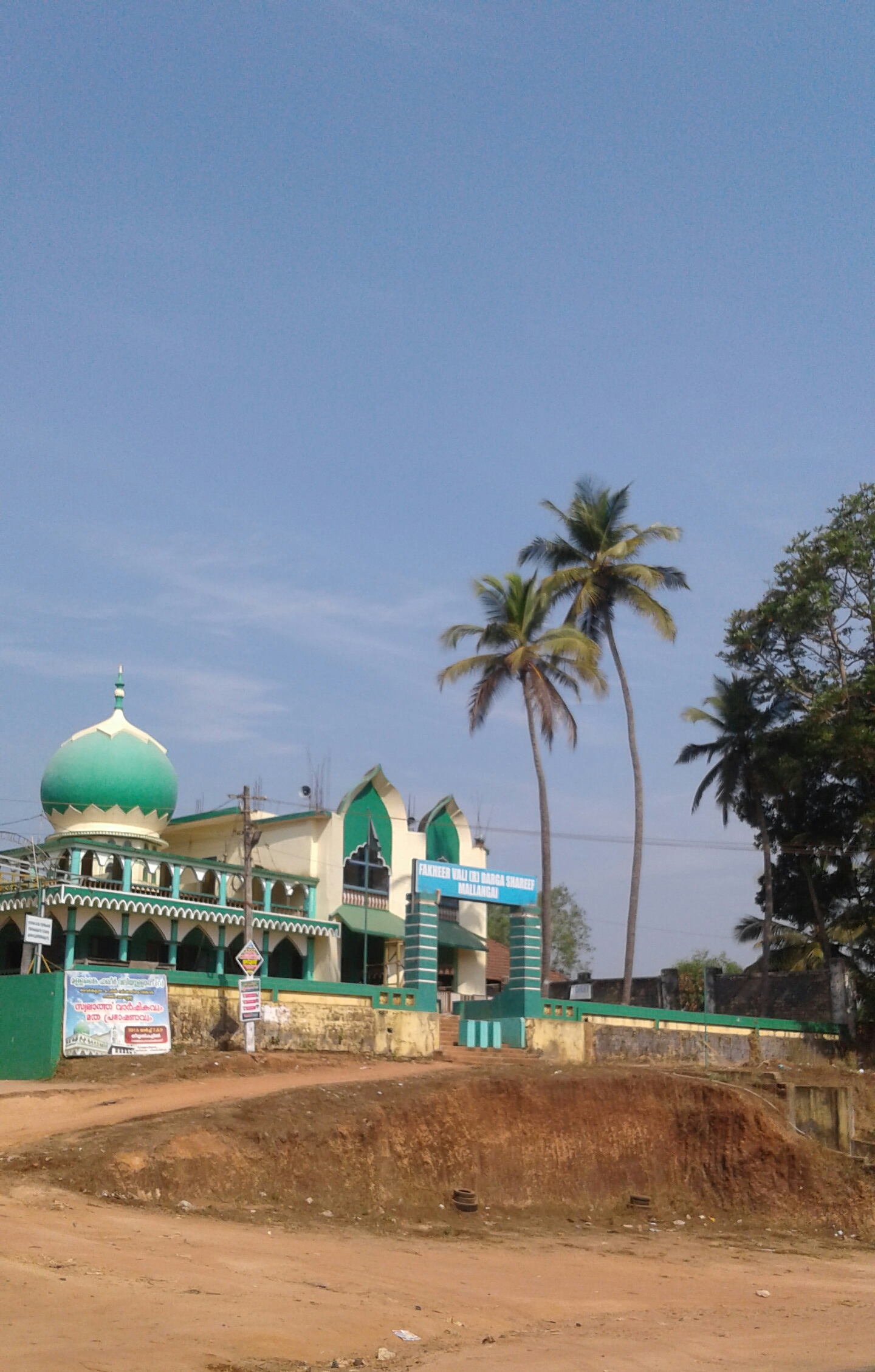
Fakir Dargah, Bandiyod Highway Junction

== Transportation ==
Local roads have access to National Highway No. 66, which connects to Mangalore in the north and Calicut in the south. The nearest railway stations are Kumbla and Uppala on the Mangalore-Palakkad line. There is an airport at Mangalore.

== Languages ==
This locality is an essentially multi-lingual region. The people speak Tulu, Malayalam, Urdu, Beary, Kannada and Konkani. Migrant workers also speak Hindi and Tamil languages. This village is part of Manjeswaram assembly constituency which is again part of Kasaragod (Lok Sabha constituency).

== Health ==
- Shetty's Clinic --Dr.Radhakrishna Shetty
- Bandiyod Specialist Hospital (BSH), Adka Road,
- Ayu Sagar Ayurvedic Hospital
- Afia Clinic
- Doctors Lab
- Nisha hospital (closed)

== Image gallery ==
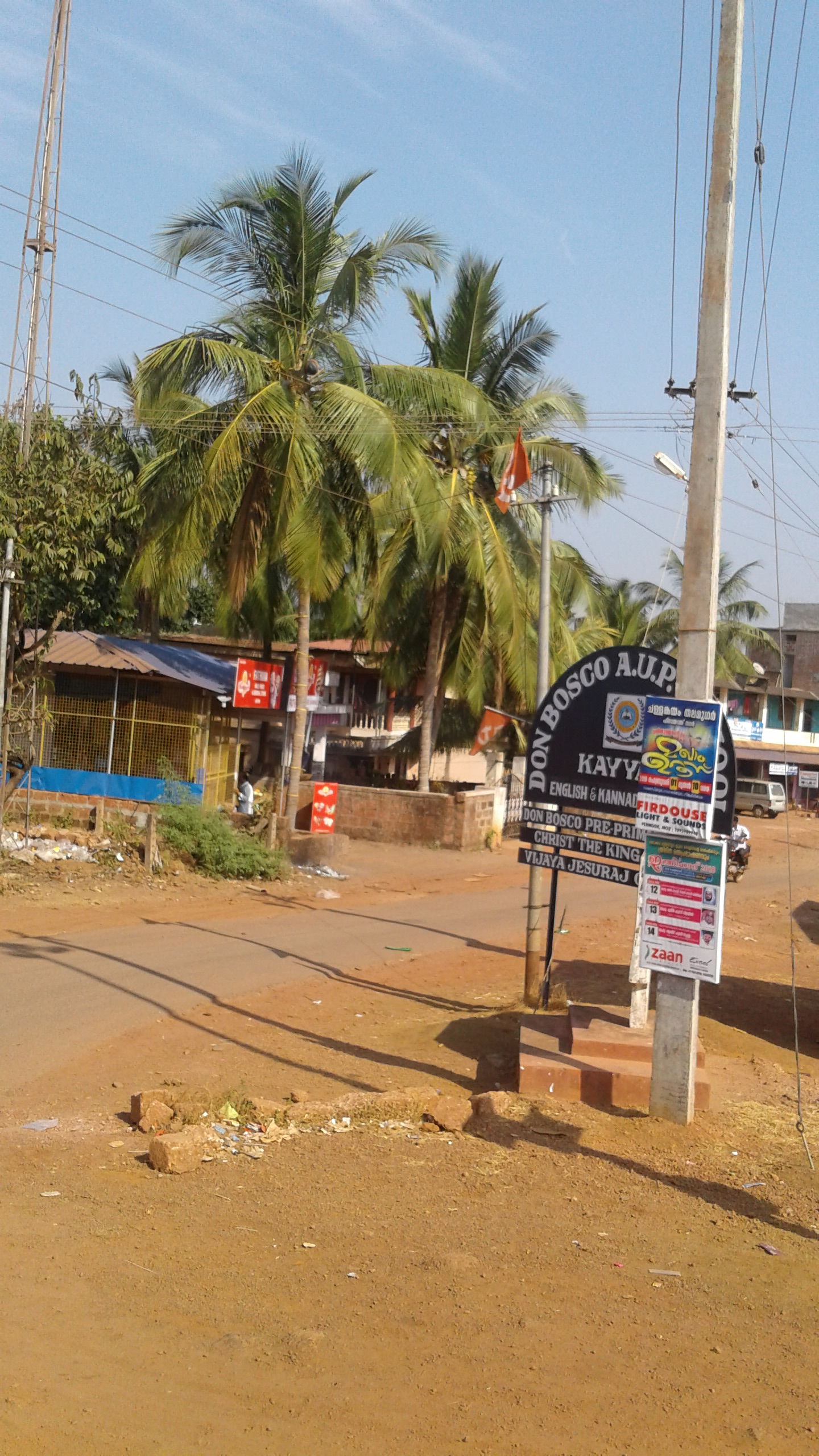
Kayyar

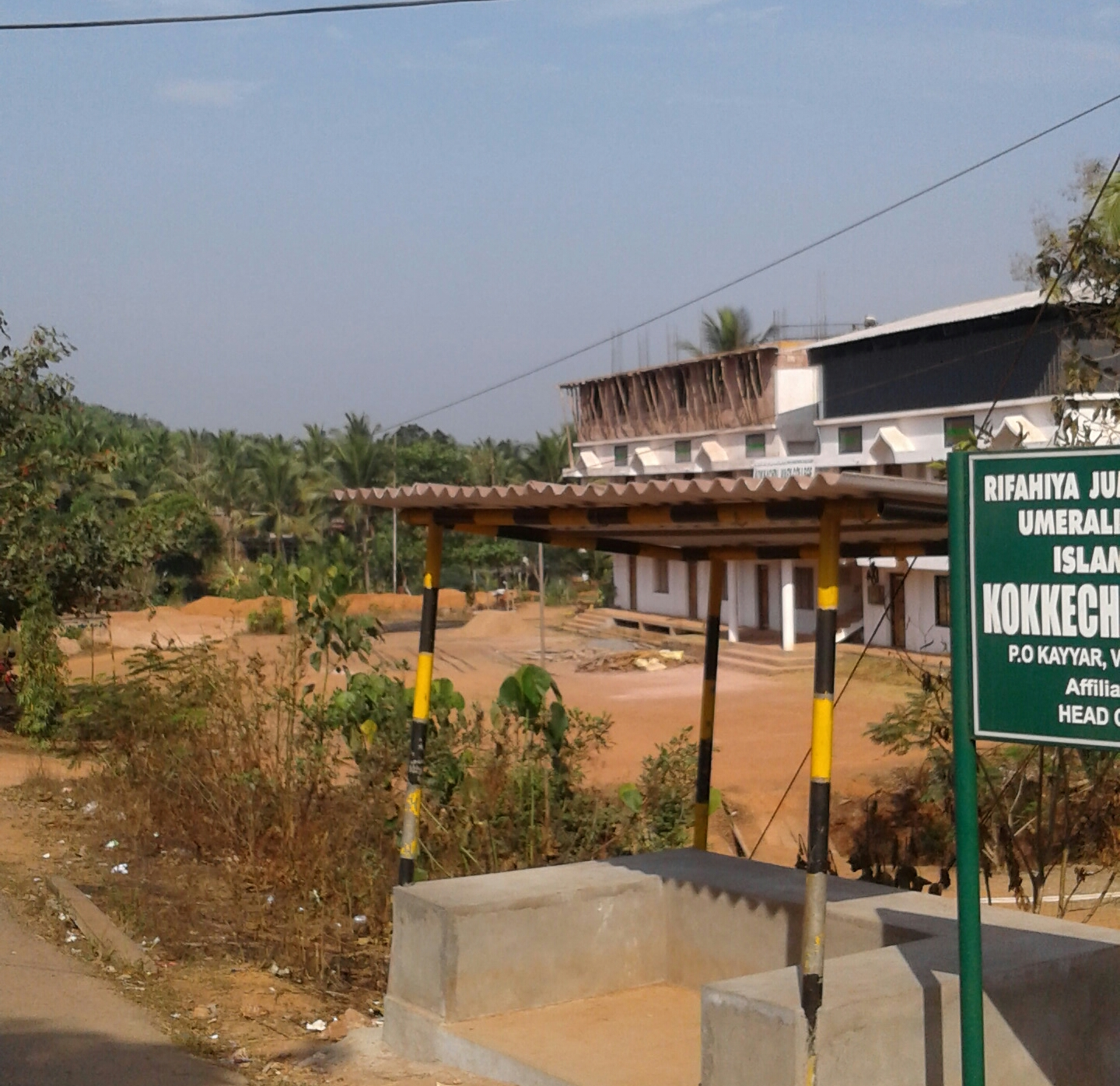
Wafi College

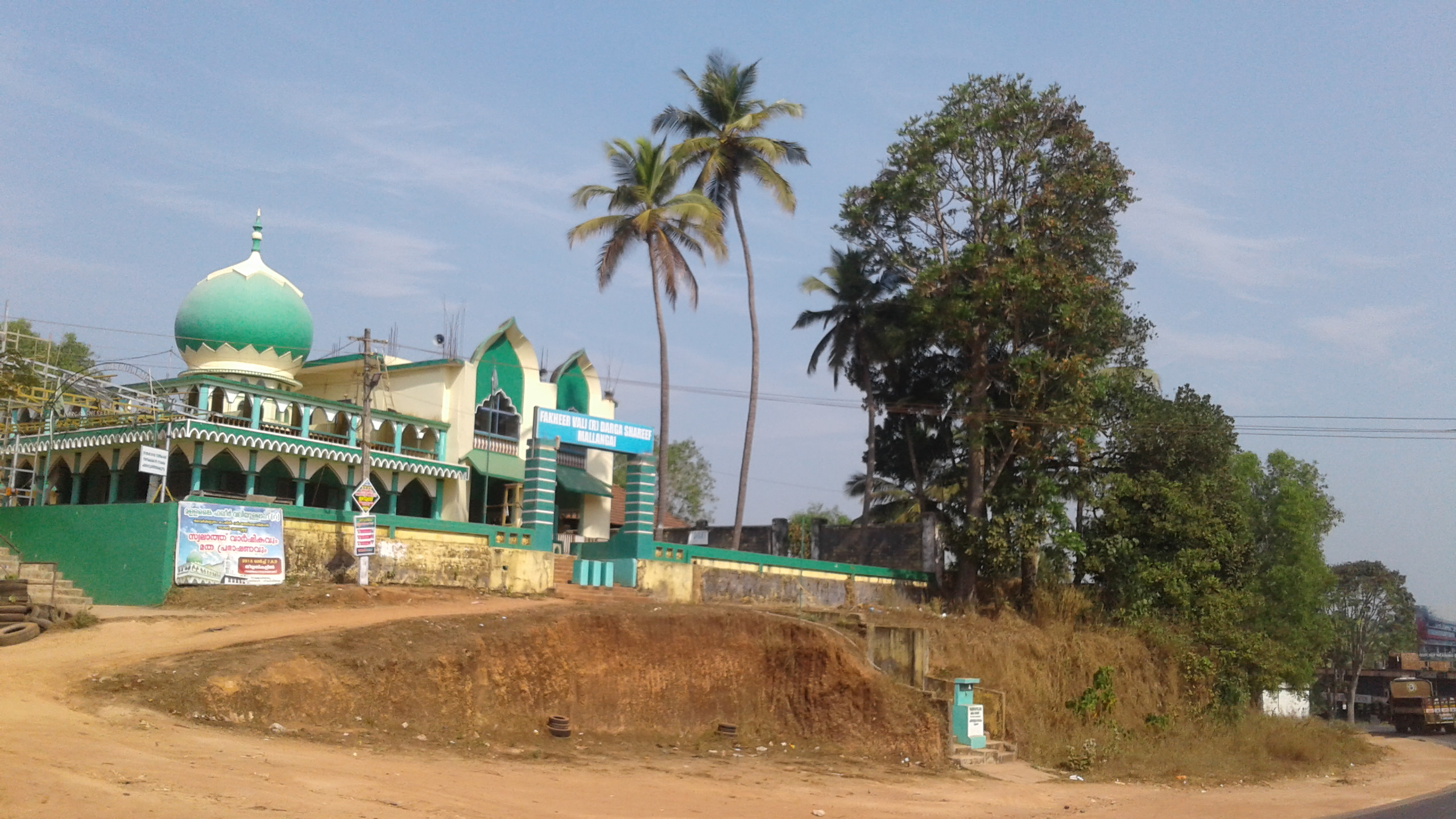
Mallangai

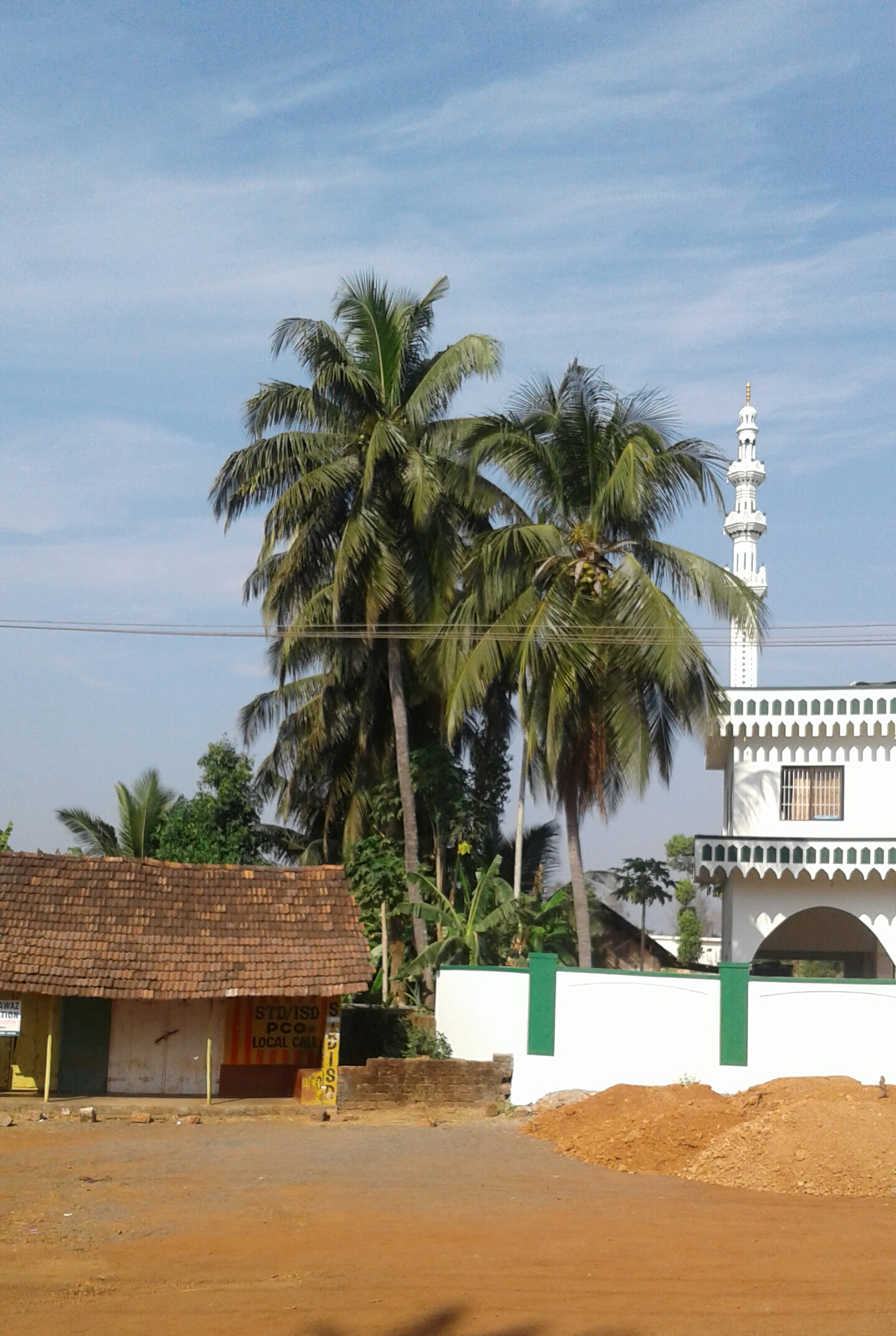
Chevar

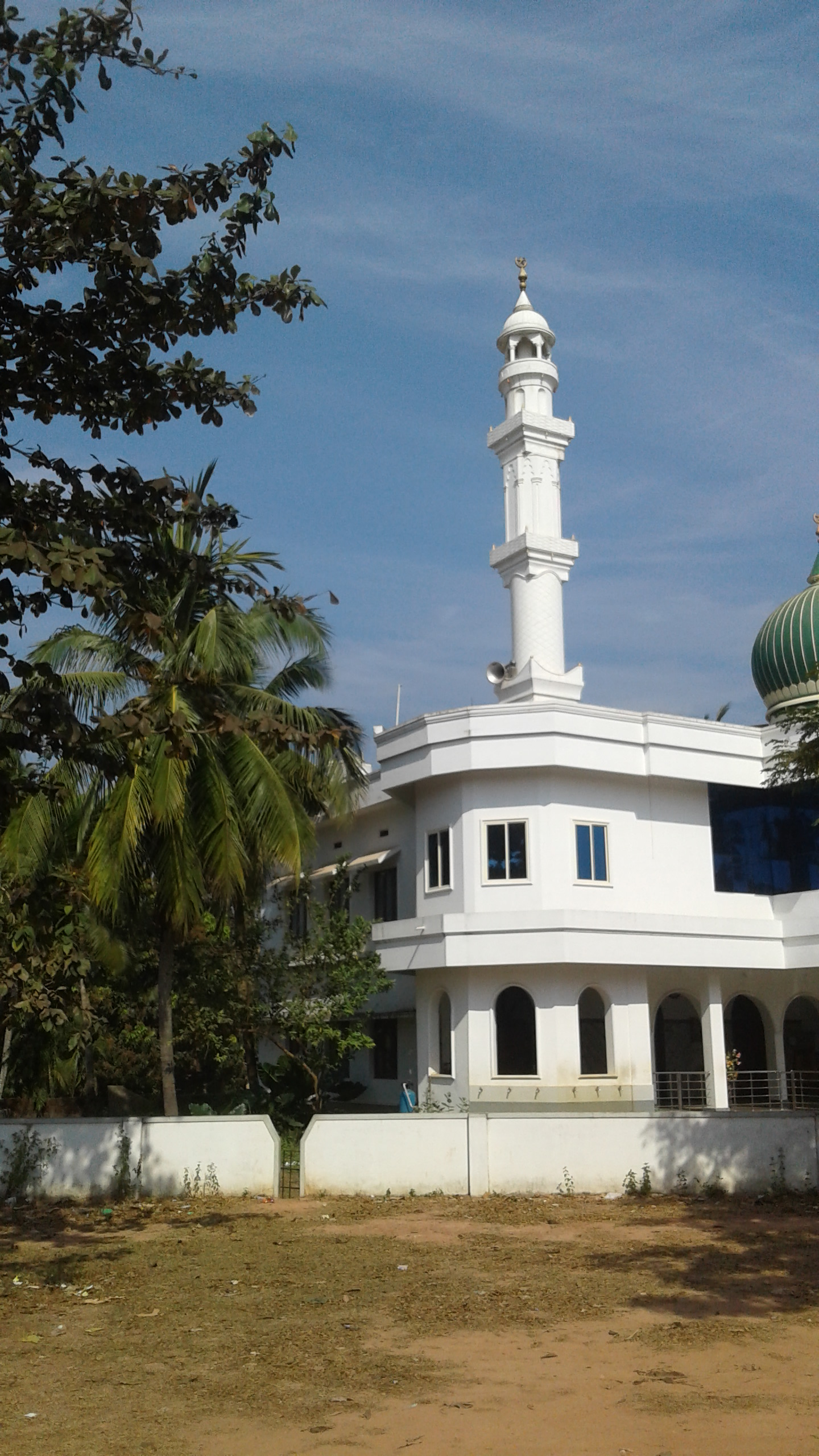
Adka
