= Kondevoor =

Village in Kerala, India

Kondevoor is a small village in Uppala, Kasaragod district, Kerala state, India.

== Landmarks ==
Kondevoor is known for Shri Gayathri Matha Temple and Sadguru Shree Nithyananda Vidyapeeta High School, a higher secondary school with about 350 students, both national and international. The school is under the administration of Shri Nithyananda Yogashrama.

== Languages ==
This locality is an essentially multi-lingual region. The people speak Malayalam, Kannada, Tulu, Beary bashe and Konkani. Migrant workers also speak Hindi and Tamil languages.

== Administration ==
This village is part of Manjeswaram assembly constituency which is again part of Kasaragod (Lok Sabha constituency)

== Transportation ==
Local roads have access to National Highway No.66 which connects to Mangalore in the north and Calicut in the south. The nearest railway station is Manjeshwar on Mangalore-Palakkad line. There is an airport at Mangalore.
