= Anekallu =

Village in Kasaragod, Kerala, India

- Village
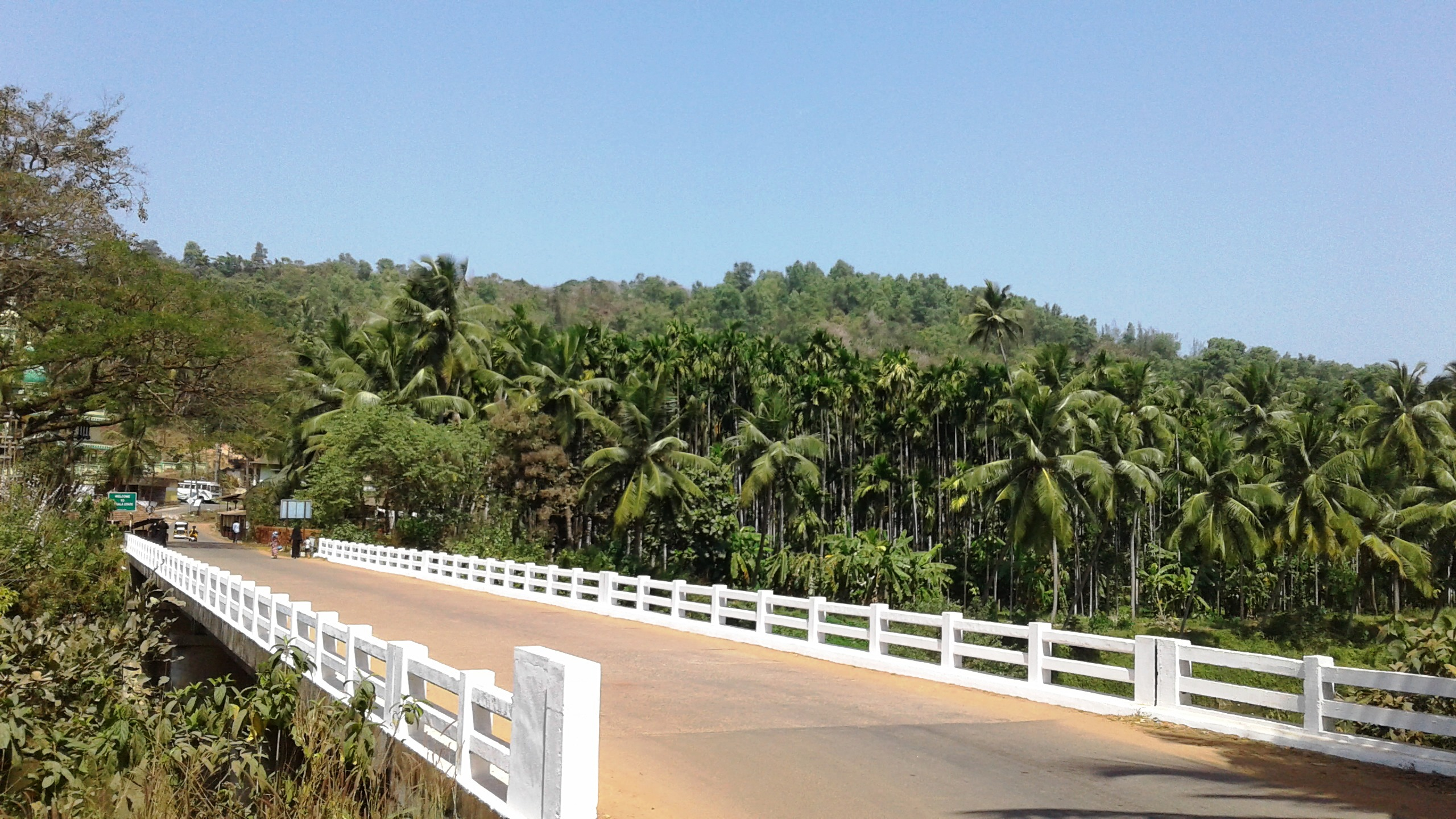
- Anekallu Bridge

- Location in India
- Coordinates: 12°45′08″N 74°59′39″E
- Country: India
- State: Kerala
- District: Kasaragod

Anekallu/Anekal is a small village near Uppala in Kasaragod district of Kerala state, India surrounded with forests.

The village is located on a boarder, shared among the Kerala and Karnataka. The local people speak Kannada, Malayalam, and also Tulu, Havyaka and Konkani.

== Location ==
Anekallu is located on the eastern border of Kerala with Karnataka state. It is 36 kilometres (22 mi) from the district headquarters at Kasaragod. It can be accessed by bus from Uppala or Hosangadi on the Mangalore-Calicut highway.

The village is the location of a bridge that separates the two states of Kerala and Karnataka.

== Gallery ==
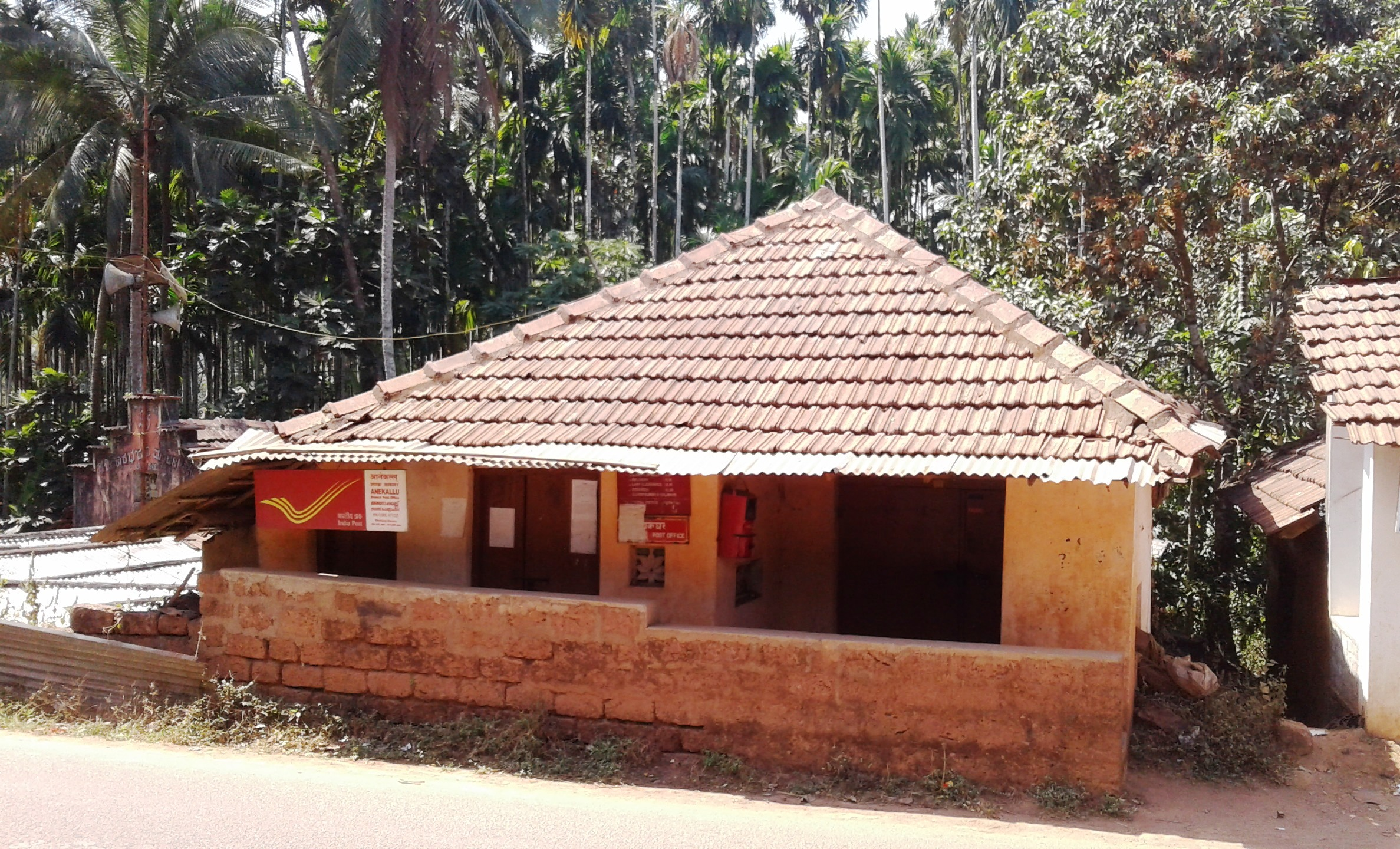
Post Office

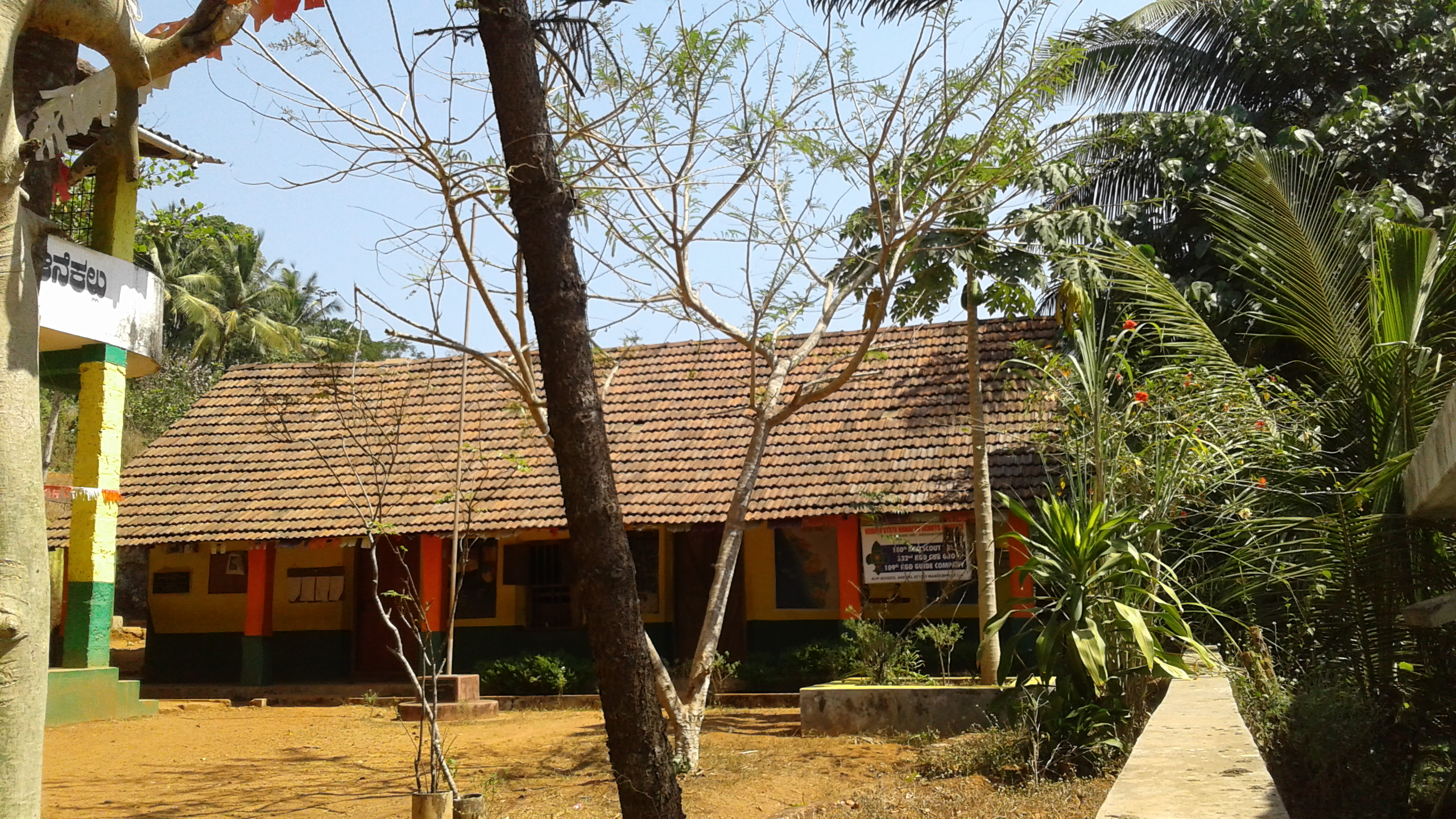
Primary School

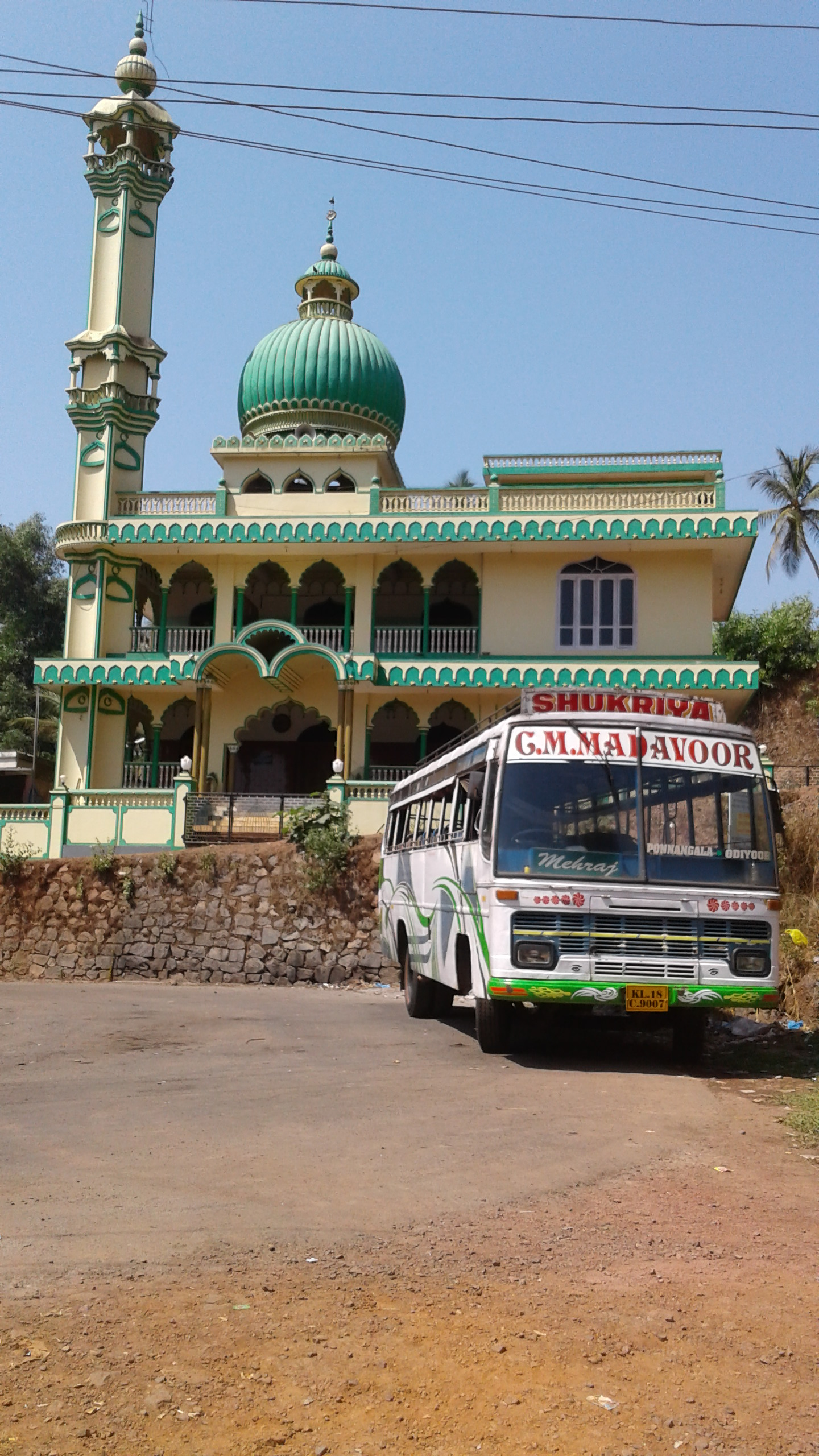
Maimoon mosque

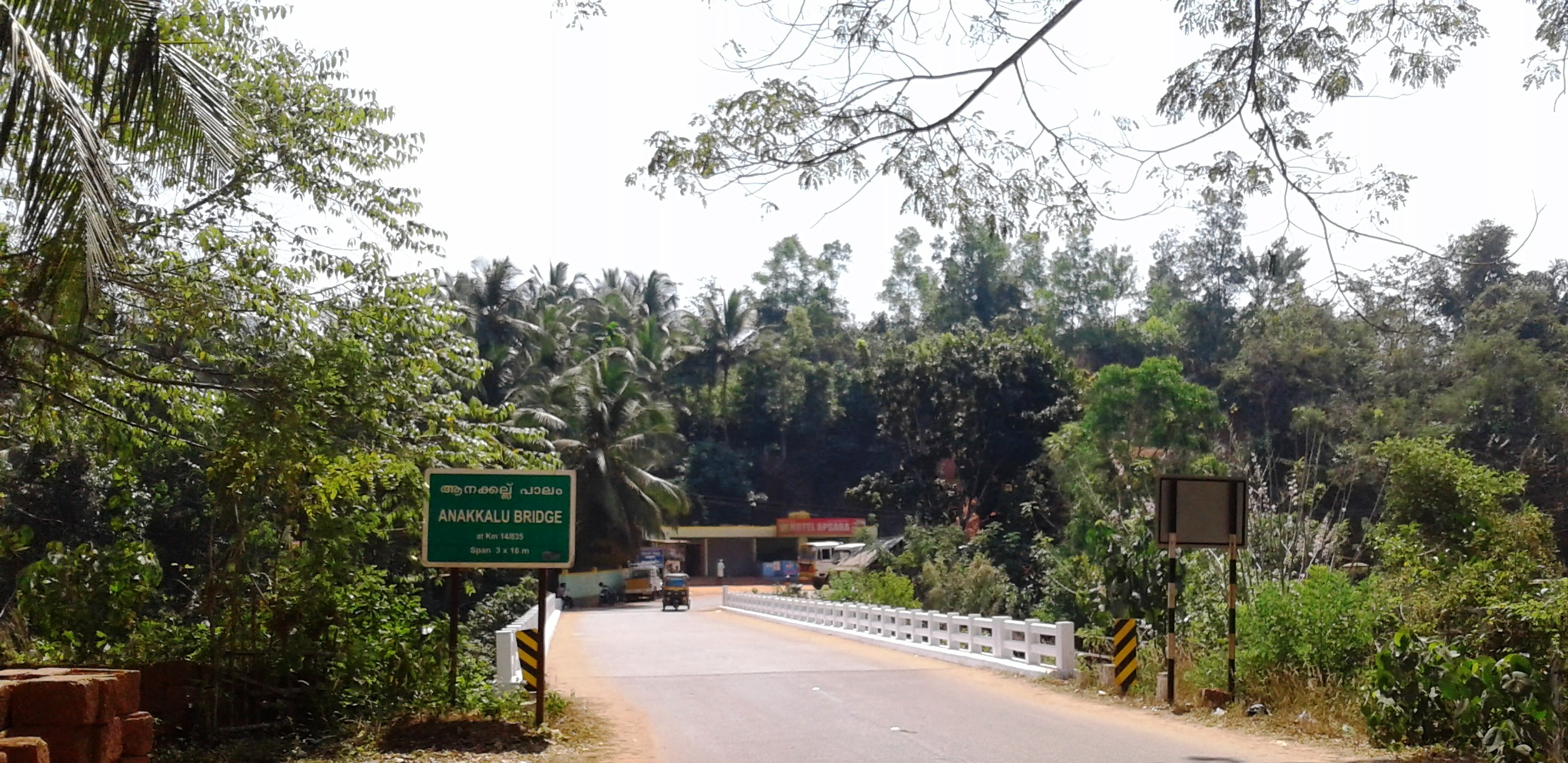
The bridge

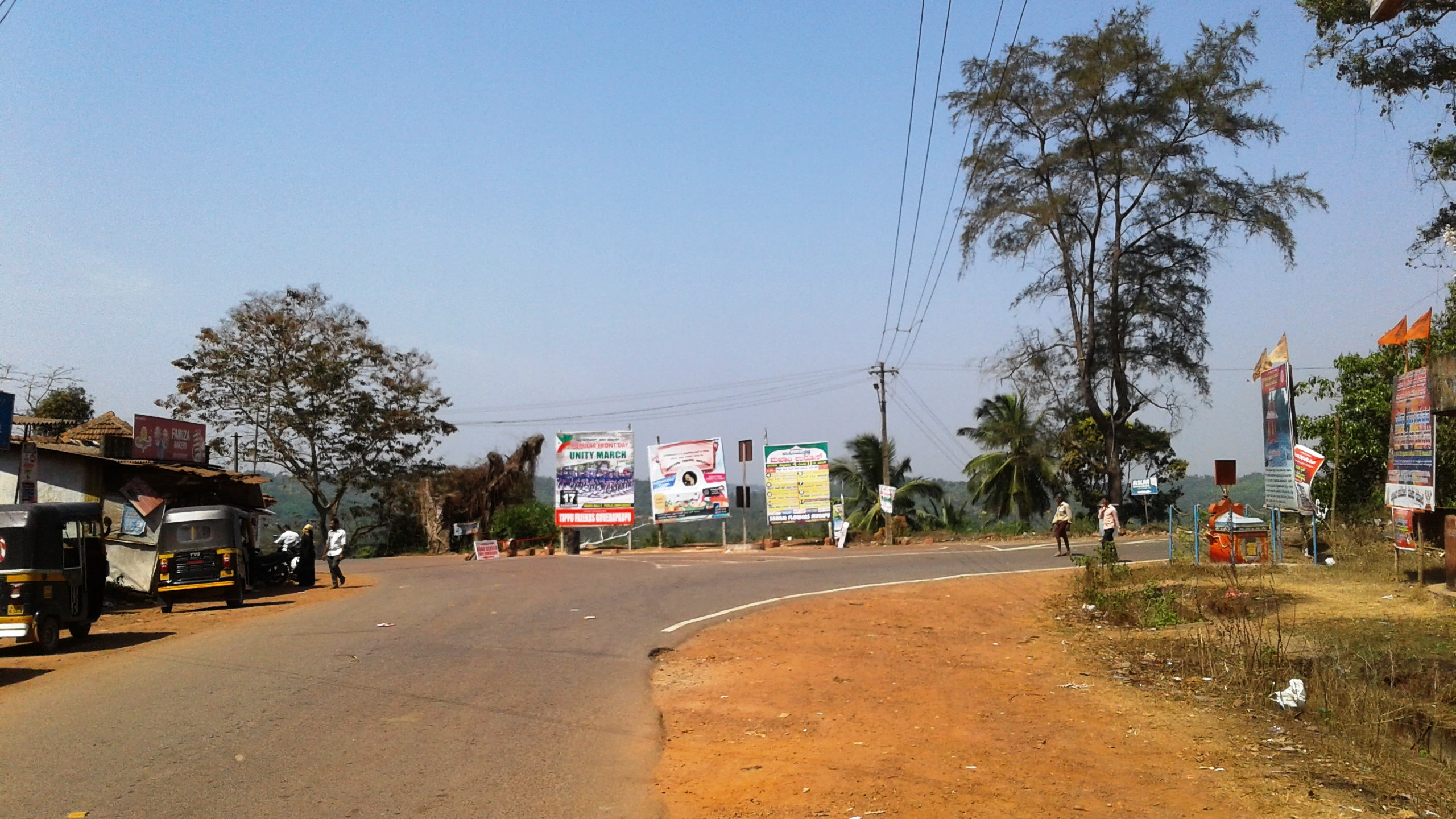
Guveapadavu hills

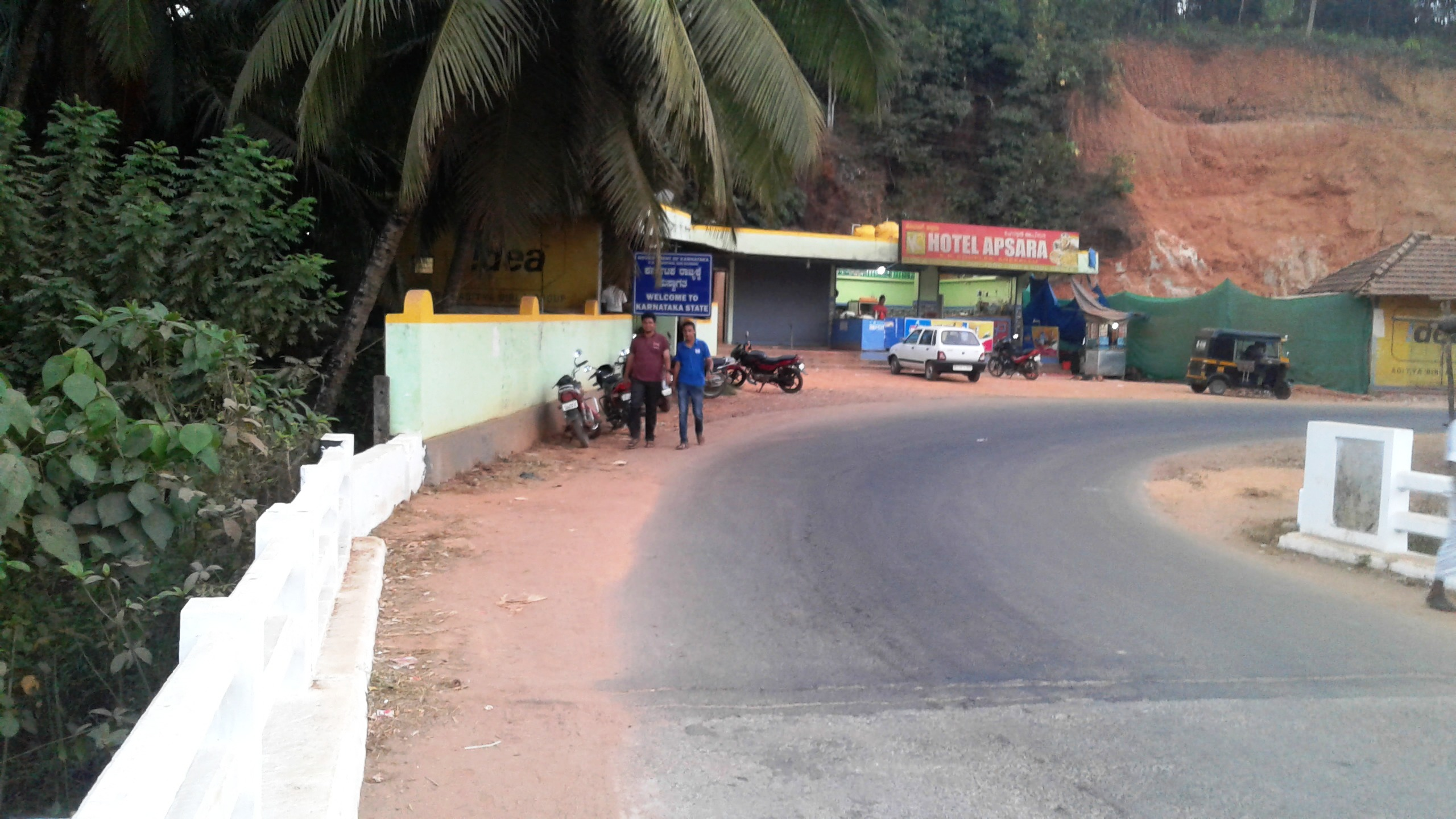
Anekallu town
