= Uppala Gate =

- Town
- Location within Kerala Location within India
- Coordinates: 12.6°N 75.0°E
- Country: India
- State: Kerala
- Region: Malabar
- District: Kasaragod
- Taluk: Manjeshwar
- Time zone: UTC+5:30 (IST)
- PIN: 671322
- Telephone code: 04998
- Vehicle registration: KL-14

Uppala Gate is a small town in Uppala, Kasaragod district, Kerala. It is located about 1 kilometre (0.62 mi) north from the Uppala town.

== Transportation ==
Local roads have access to National Highway No.66 which connects to Mangalore in the north and Calicut in the south. The nearest railway station is Manjeshwar on Mangalore-Palakkad line. There is an airport at Mangalore.

== Languages ==
This locality is an essentially multi-lingual region. The people speak Malayalam, Kannada, Tulu, Beary bashe, Urdu and Konkani. Migrant workers also speak Hindi and Marathi languages.

== Administration ==
This village is part of Manjeswaram assembly constituency which is again part of Kasaragod (Lok Sabha constituency)
