= Deenar Nagar =

Coordinates: 12.652°N 74.948°E

Deenar Nagar is a small town in Kasaragod district, Kerala, India. Deenar Nagar is located about 3 km inwards to Bandiyod, a small town between Kasaragod and Mangalore. It is around 19.7 km north to the Kasaragod town and 39 km south to Mangalore.

== Sports ==
Football and cricket are given major importance in Deenar Nagar. Other sports like volleyball and gori are also played there.

Dilkush Stadium is one of the best in the area and one of the oldest football clubs in the Kasaragod district.

Victory Arts & Sports Club (VASC) Deenar Nagar is one of the oldest clubs, established in 1951 which is prominent in football, cricket & volleyball.

== Mosques ==
Muhiyuddeen Jumah Masjid is the only mosque in Deenar Nagar.

== Transport ==
=== Air ===
The nearest airport to Deenar Nagar is Mangalore International Airport, which is around 44.8 km away from the town. Kannur International Airport, which is 141 km from the town is under construction. Other airports near Deenar Nagar is Calicut International Airport, lies about 223 km to the south and Mysore Airport, which is around 259 km to the south east.

=== Road ===
Deena Nagar Bus Station is the only bus station in Deenar Nagar. Private buses are servicing through Deenar Nagar on regular intervals.

== Schools and education ==
Malandoor UP school is situated in Deenar Nagar and is controlled by Kerala Government. There are other few schools nearby like Kunil Education Trust, AJI English Medium School, Shihab English Medium School, Uppala Government School, Meepiry Government School and Ichlangod Government School.

== Languages ==
This locality is an essentially multi-lingual region. The people speak Malayalam, Kannada, Tulu, Beary bashe and Konkani. Migrant workers also speak Hindi and Tamil languages. This village is part of Manjeswaram assembly constituency which is again part of Kasaragod (Lok Sabha constituency)

== Infrastructure ==
=== Garden City Auditorium ===
The region's only Auditorium, Garden City Auditorium, was established in 2018. Garden City Auditorium can accommodate around 2000-3000 people and can be used for occasions like weddings, meetings, etc.
