= Kanyana =

Village in Karnataka, India

Kanyana is a village in the southern state of Karnataka, India. It is located in the Bantwal Taluk of Dakshina Kannada district in Karnataka. The majority of the population are Hindus, Catholics and Muslims and the main languages spoken are Tulu, Havyaka, Kannada, Malayalam and Konkani.

== Demographics ==
As of 2011 India census, number of household are 1465, Kanyana had a population of 7,650 with 3,771 males and 3,879 females.

== Image gallery ==
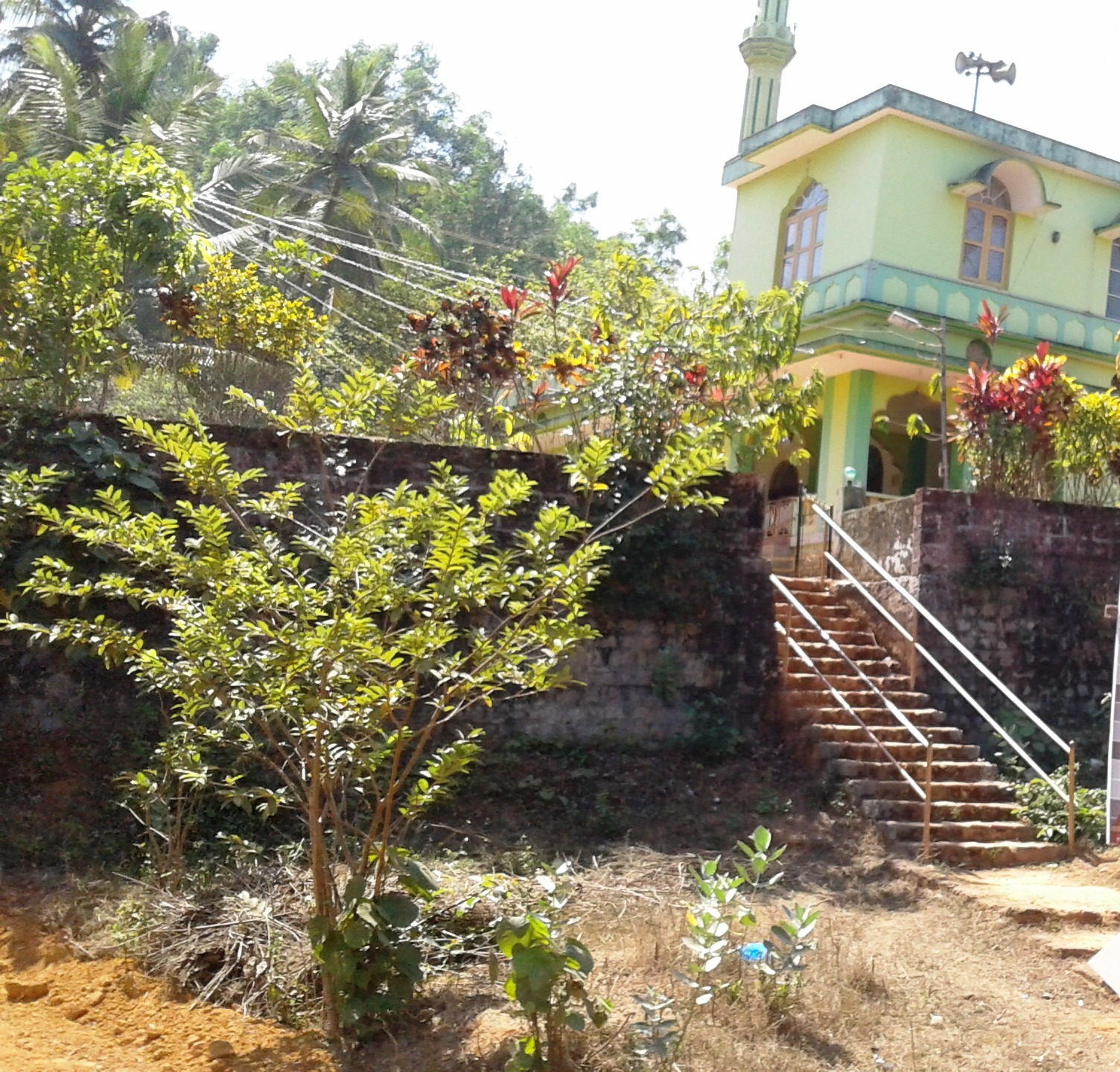
Kukkaje

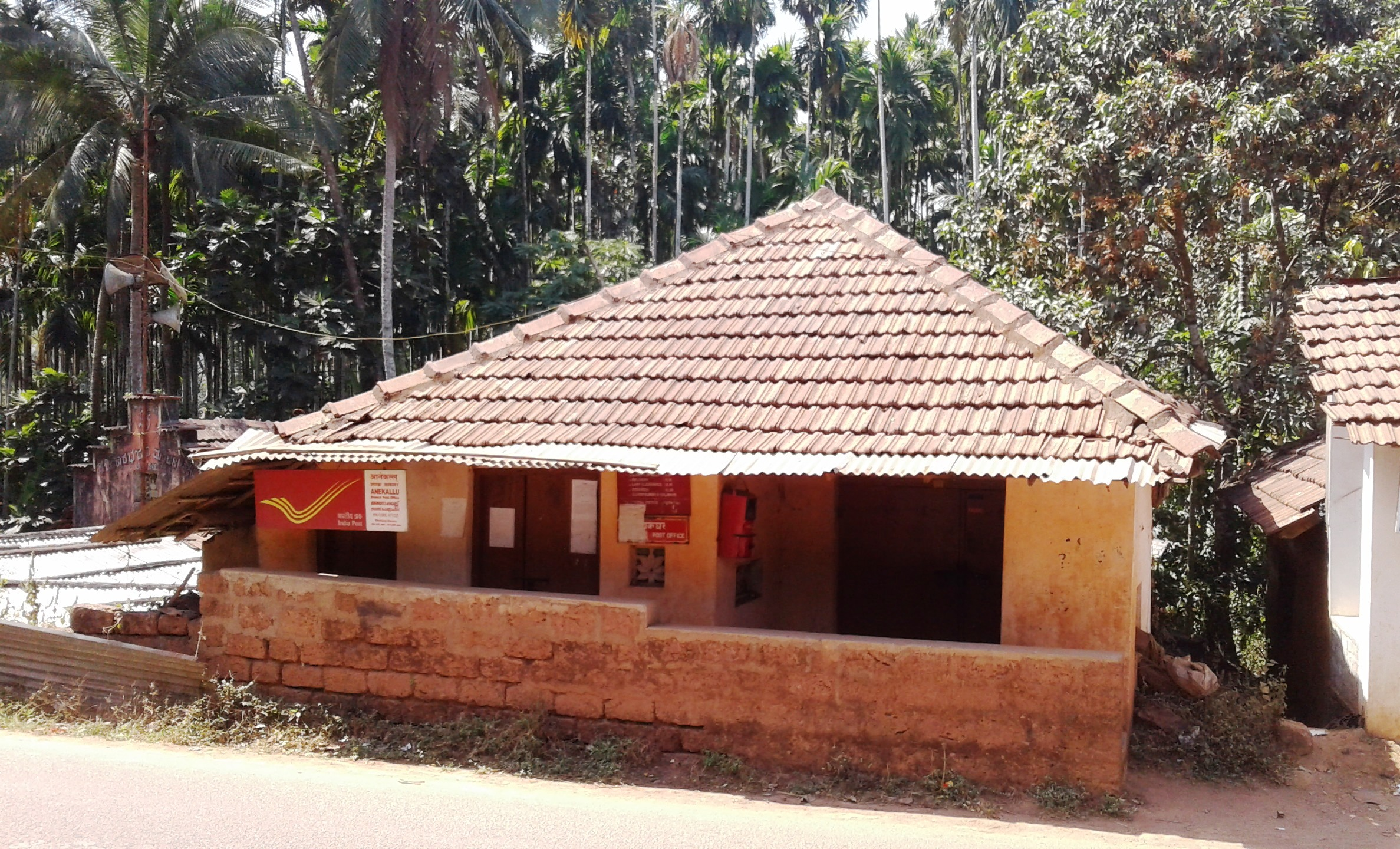
Anekallu

== See also ==
- Mangalore
- Anekallu

== Dakshina Kannada ==
- Districts of Karnataka
