= Bayar, Kasaragod =

Bayar
- Village
- Location in Kerala, India Bayar (India)
- Coordinates: 12°41′0″N 75°0′0″E
- Country: India
- State: Kerala
- District: Kasaragod
- Taluk: Manjeshwaram

Government
  - Body: Paivalike Grama Panchayat

Area
  - Total: 24.49 km^{2} (9.46 sq mi)

Population (2011)
  - Total: 11,057
  - Density: 451.5/km^{2} (1,169/sq mi)

Languages
  - Official: Malayalam, English
  - Regional: Tulu, Malayalam
- Time zone: UTC+5:30 (IST)
- Postal code: 671322
- Vehicle registration: KL-14

Bayar is a village in Kasaragod district in the state of Kerala, India. Bayar is 12 km (7.5 mi) far from the Uppala town.

== Demographics ==
As of 2011 India census, Bayar village had a population of 11,057 with 5,642 males and 5,415 females. Bayar village has an area of 24.49 km^{2} with 2,022 families residing in it. Population in the age group 0-6 was 1,159 (14.4%) which constitutes 583 males and 576 females. Bayar had overall literacy of 90.5% where male literacy stands at 94.9% and female literacy was 86%.

== Geography ==
This small village is entirely surrounded by many hills. Bayar is about 4 km away to one of the beautiful picnic spot called Posadi Gumpe. It is situated to northeast to Kasargod. It is the border of Karnataka. Posadi Gumpe has a chilly climate and a fresh air about it at all times. Agriculture is main occupation here. Here we can find commercial crops like Arecanut, Coconut, Cocoa, Vanilla. Also we can find Spices like Pepper. Paddy cultivation is also found in this region. This village is part of Manjeswaram assembly constituency which is again part of Kasaragod (Lok Sabha constituency). This is also a part of Paivalike Grama Panchayath.

== Temples ==
Bayar is famous for ancient temples "Sri Panchlingeshwara Devasthanam" and "Shree Durgaparameshwari Temple Avalamutt".

1. At Panchalingeshwara temple, deity lord siva is in pancha meaning five linga form (Sadyojāta, Vāmadeva, Aghora, Tatpuruṣa and Īśāna).
2. Sri Durgaparameshwari temple at Avalamutt is over 600 year old, managed by Karhade Brahmin community. Navaratri is most celebrated event at this place.

== Festivals ==
"Badiyaru Nemotsava" is the most famous religious festival of the village which takes place around the month of April for about a week. People celebrate Navarathri, Ganesha Chathurthi, Sri Krishna Janmashtami, Maha Shivarathri, Sharada Pooja, Badiyaru Jathre, Aayudha Pooja, Deepavali, Bayar Badriya Juma Masjid, Bayar Jaram Darga, Shareef Fathima Masjid Ponnangala Ramzan, Eid-Ul-Fitar, Pernal. The village has rich cultural talents in Yakshagana. Most beloved sport is volleyball, kabaddi, cricket, and football.

== Languages ==
This locality is an essentially multi-lingual region. The people speak Malayalam, Tulu, Beary bashe, Havyaka, Konkani and Karhade Basha is spoken among Karhade Brahmin community. Migrant workers also speak Hindi and Tamil languages.

== Schools ==
- Heddari A.U.P. School Bayar Muligadde
- Prashanthi Vidya Kendra, Bayar
- Cheral English Medium School Bayar
- A.L.P. School Bayar, Perodi
- A.L.P school Avala
- Mahdanul Uloom Madrasa Bayar

== Transportation ==
Local roads have access to National Highway No.66 which connects to Mangalore in the north and Calicut in the south. The nearest railway station is Manjeshwar on Mangalore-Palakkad line. There is an airport at Mangalore. It is 56 km away from Mangalore International Airport and 141 km Away from Kannur International Airport.

== Image gallery ==
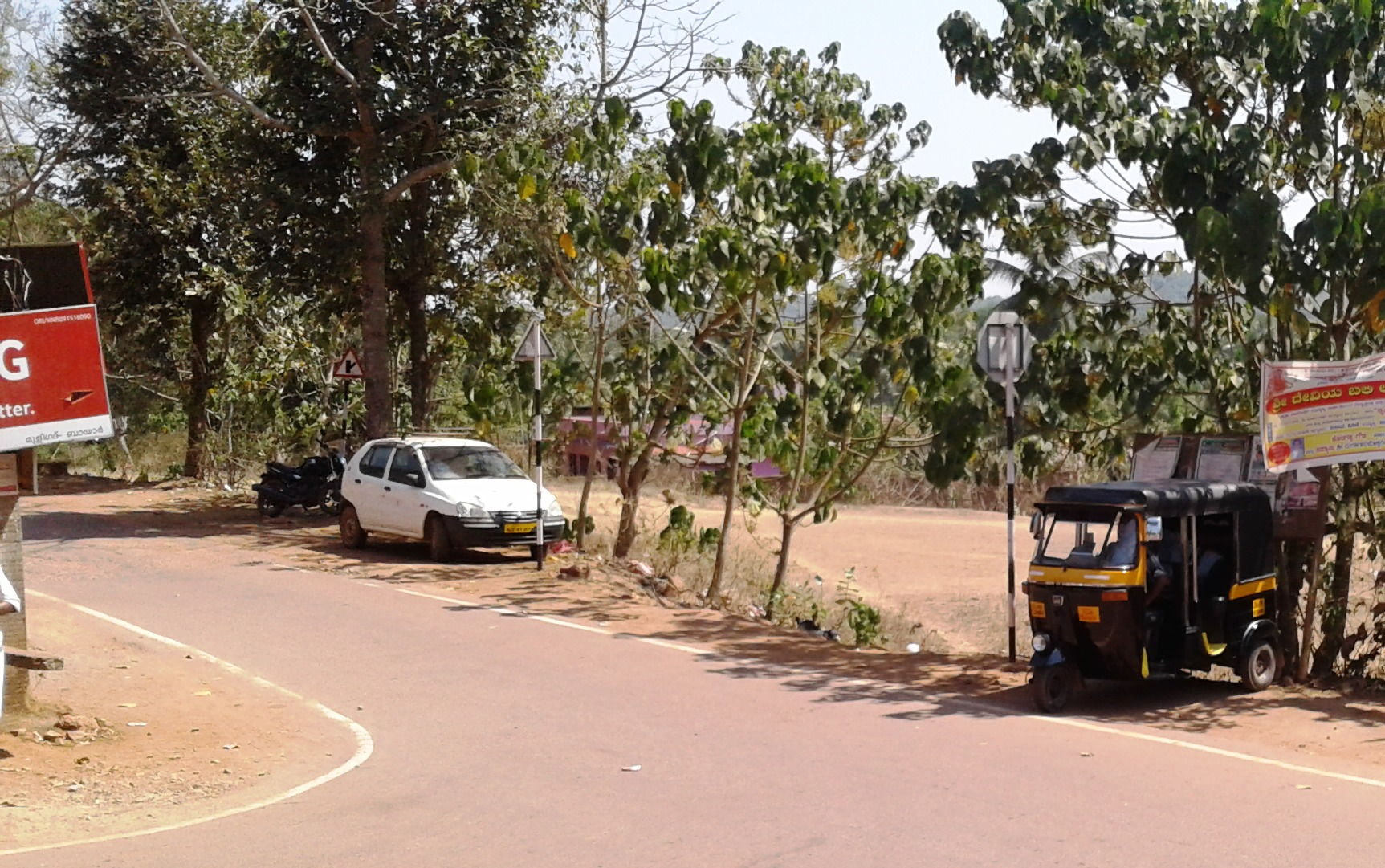
Mulighadhe

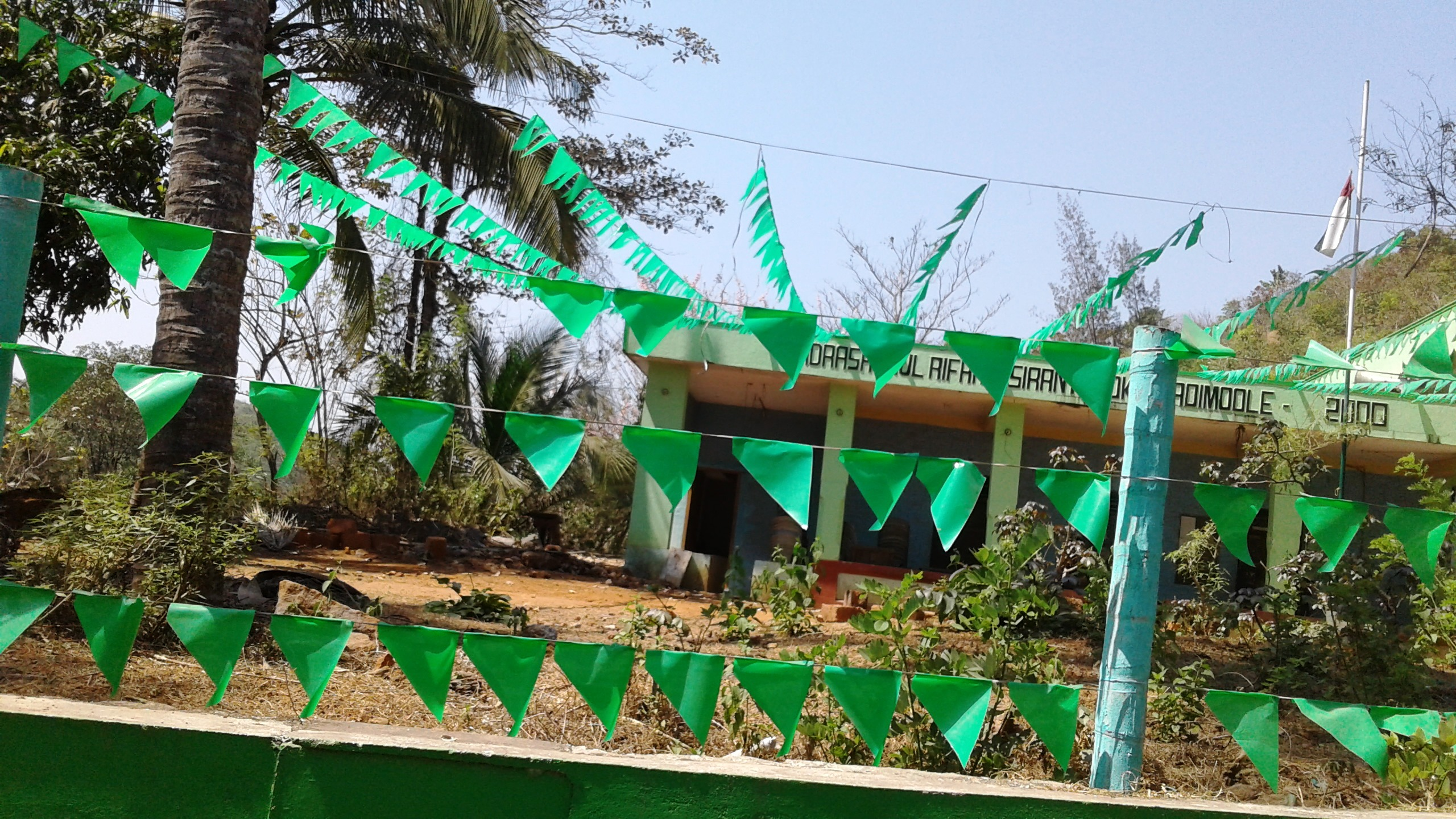
Sinthadka
