= Uppala =

- Town
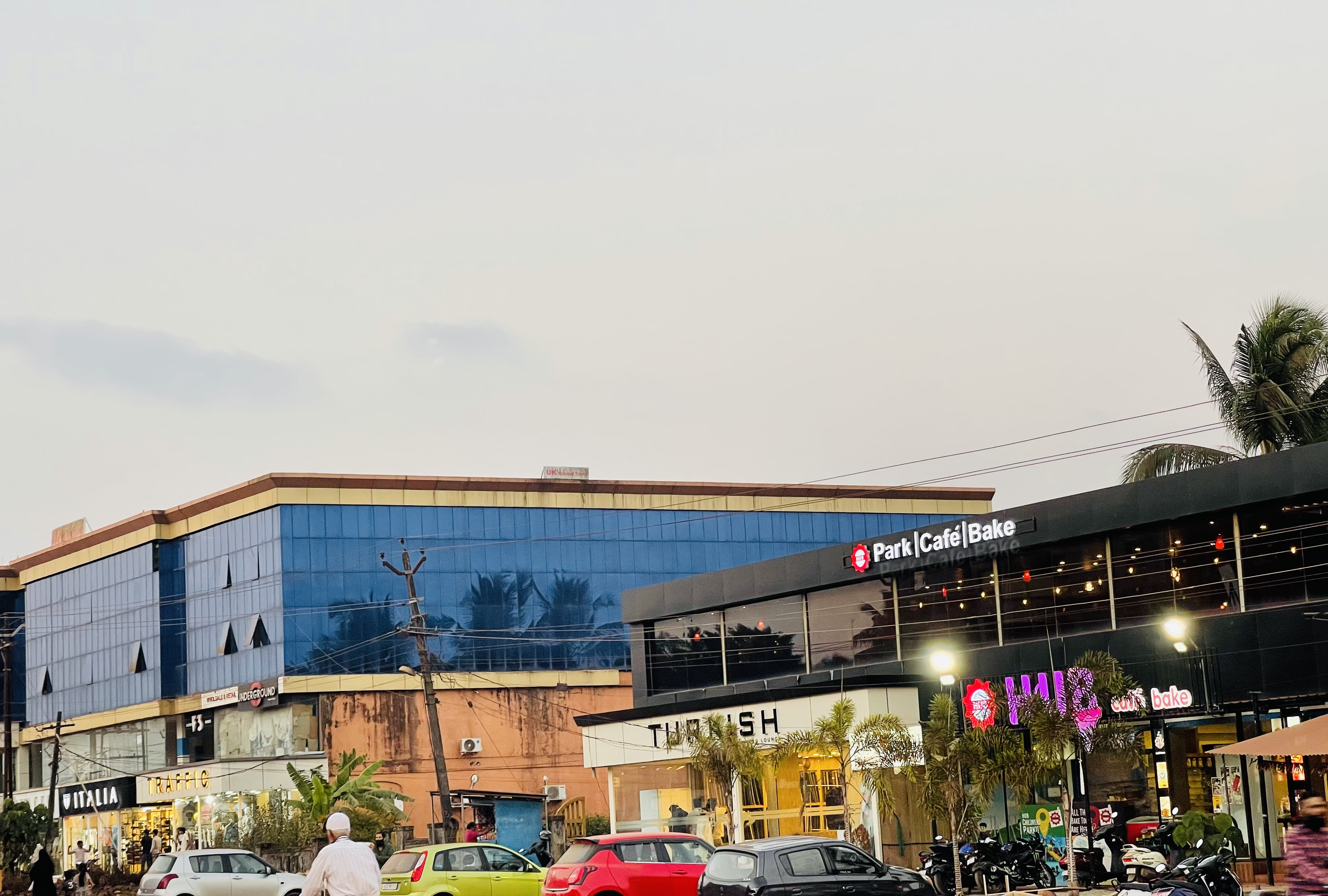
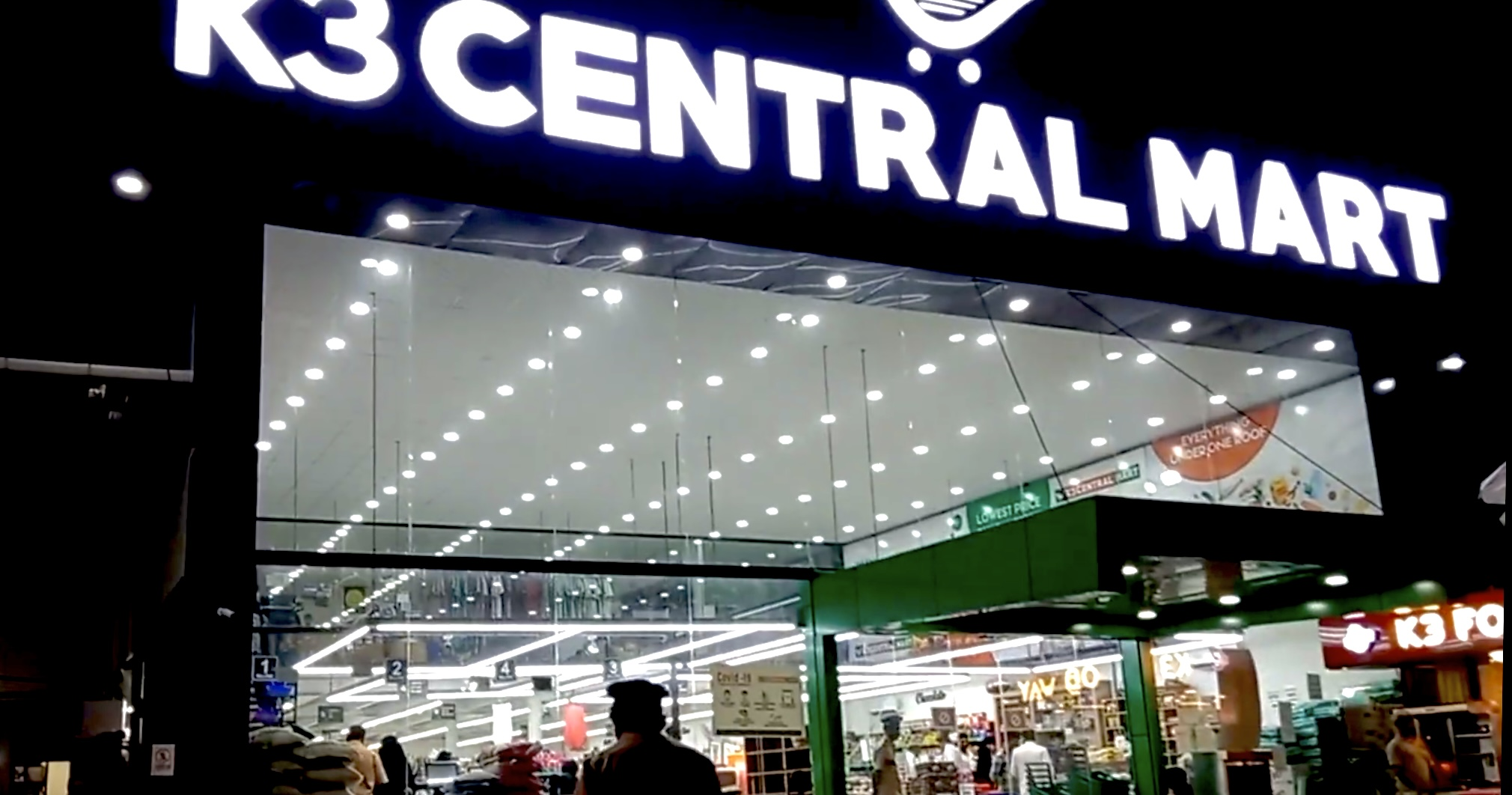
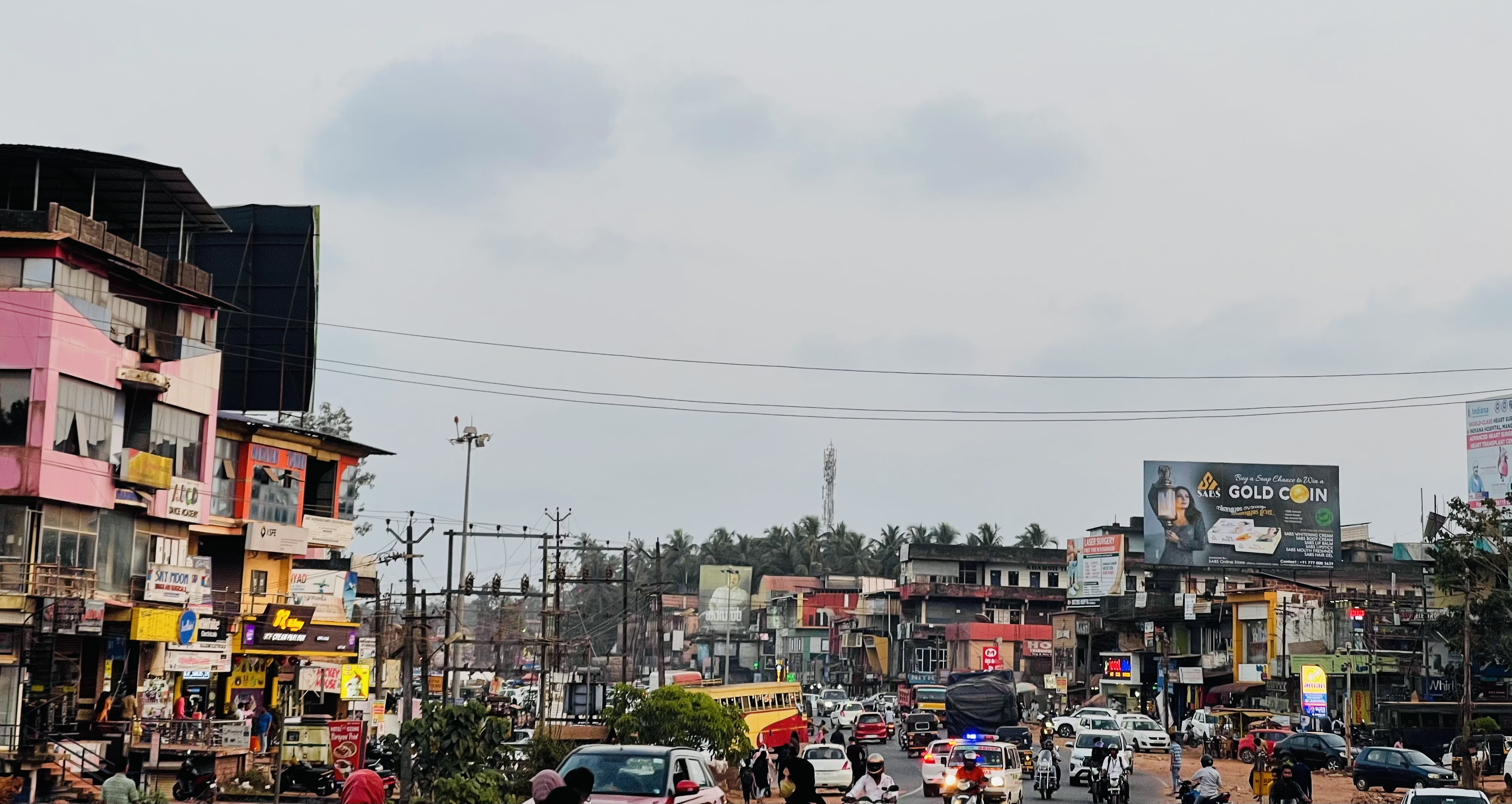
- From Top to bottom: Hidayath Bazar, K3 central mart, NH66 Near Bus Stand Uppala

- Location in Kerala, India Uppala (India)
- Coordinates: 12°40′40″N 74°54′25″E
- Country: India
- State: Kerala
- Region: North Malabar
- District: Kasaragod
- Taluk: Manjeshwaram

Government
  - Body: Mangalpady Grama Panchayat

Area
  - Total: 10.2 km^{2} (3.9 sq mi)
- Elevation: 20 m (66 ft)

Population (2011)
  - Total: 22,953
  - Density: 2,250/km^{2} (5,830/sq mi)
  - Grama Panchayat: 48,441

Languages
  - Official: Malayalam
  - Regional: Tulu
- Time zone: UTC+5:30 (IST)
- PIN: 671322
- Telephone code: 04998
- Vehicle registration: KL-14
- Lok Sabha constituency: Kasaragod
- Niyamasabha constituency: Manjeshwaram
- Sex ratio: 1096 ♀/♂
- Literacy: 91%
- Climate: Tropical monsoon (Köppen-Geiger)
- Avg. summer temperature: 29.5 °C (85.1 °F)
- Avg. winter temperature: 26 °C (79 °F) 98 kilometres (61 mi)
- Precipitation: 3,801 millimetres (149.6 in)

Uppala is a town and headquarters of the Manjeshwaram taluk in the Kasaragod district, Kerala, India. It is geographically located midway from Kasaragod to Mangalore. Easy geographical access and lack of major towns nearby are the key reasons for the town to develop exponentially, especially in the past decade. Uppala is 22 km north of Kasaragod and one of the fastest-growing urban settlements in the Kasaragod district. It is well-known as an important trade hub in the northernmost part of Kerala state.

== Location ==
Uppala is located midway between Kasaragod and Mangalore. It is around 22 km north of Kasaragod and 24 km south of Mangalore . Uppala is located about 586 km north of the state capital, Thiruvananthapuram. National Highway 66, which used to be known as NH 17, passes through the town. Uppala used to be known as Kurchipalla.

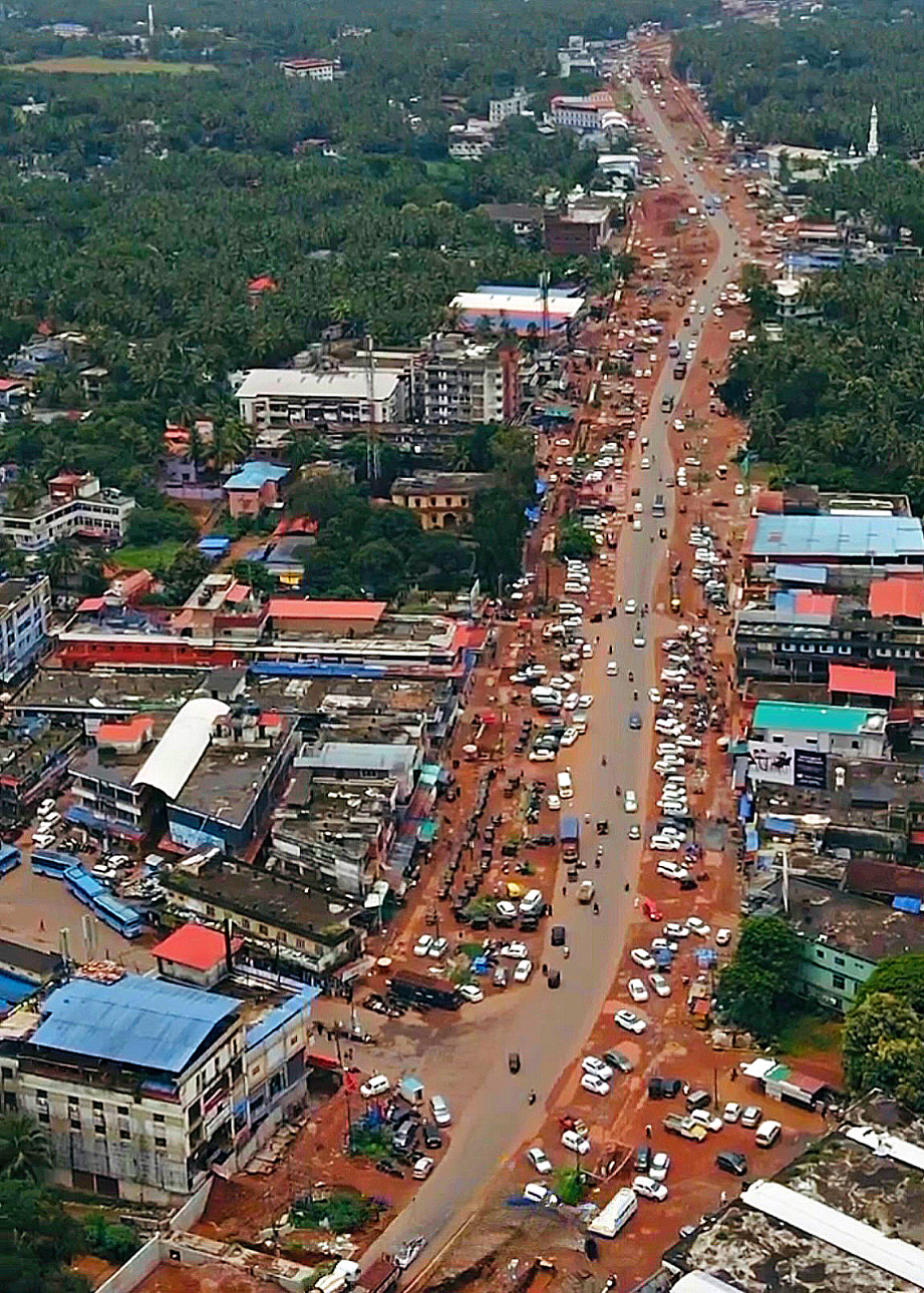
Birds Eye view of Uppala before flyover construction towards South

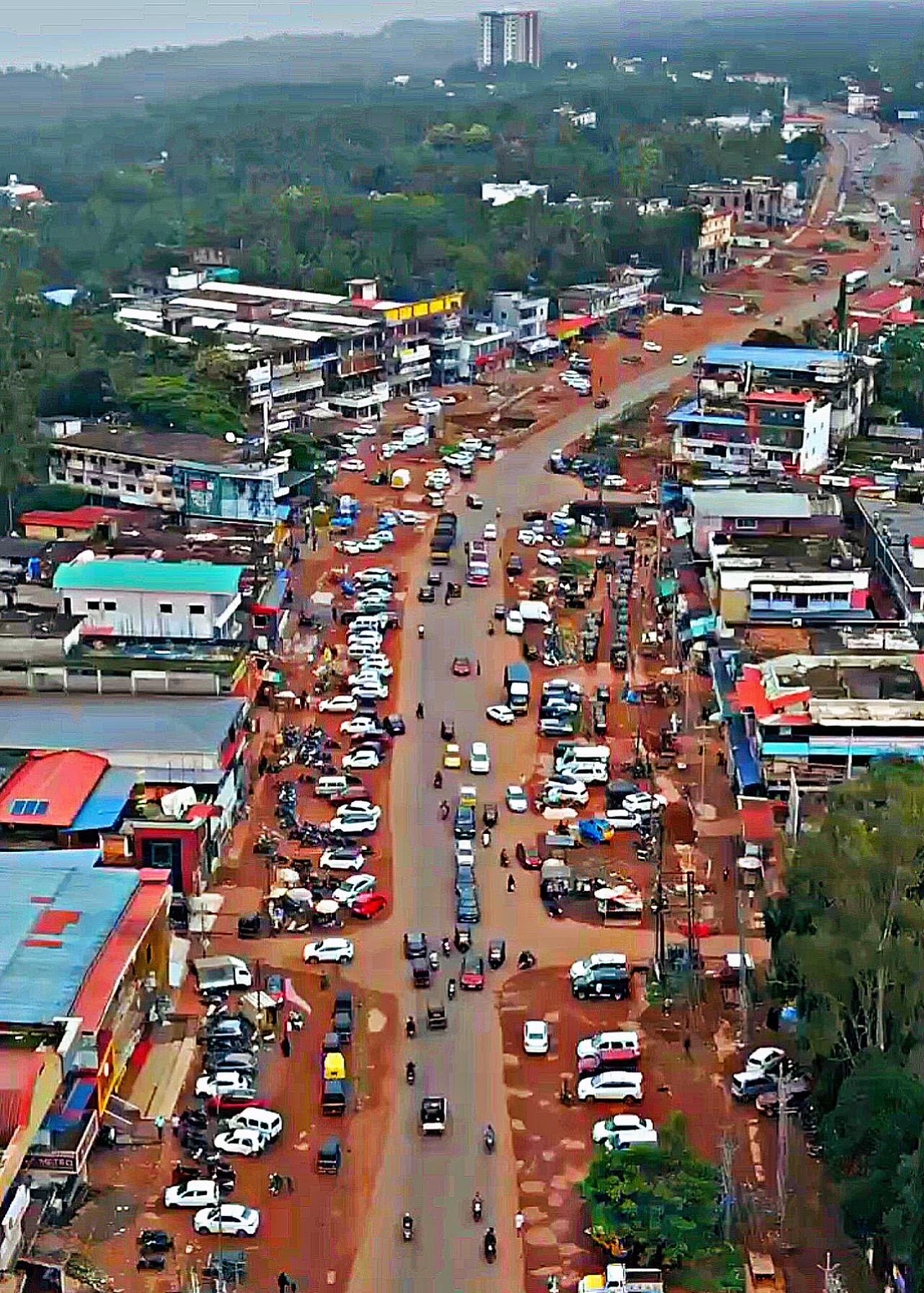
Birds Eye view of Uppala before flyover construction towards North

Uppala is located near the Arabian Sea, and has a very low elevation of nine metres. The town is densely populated near the National Highway 66.

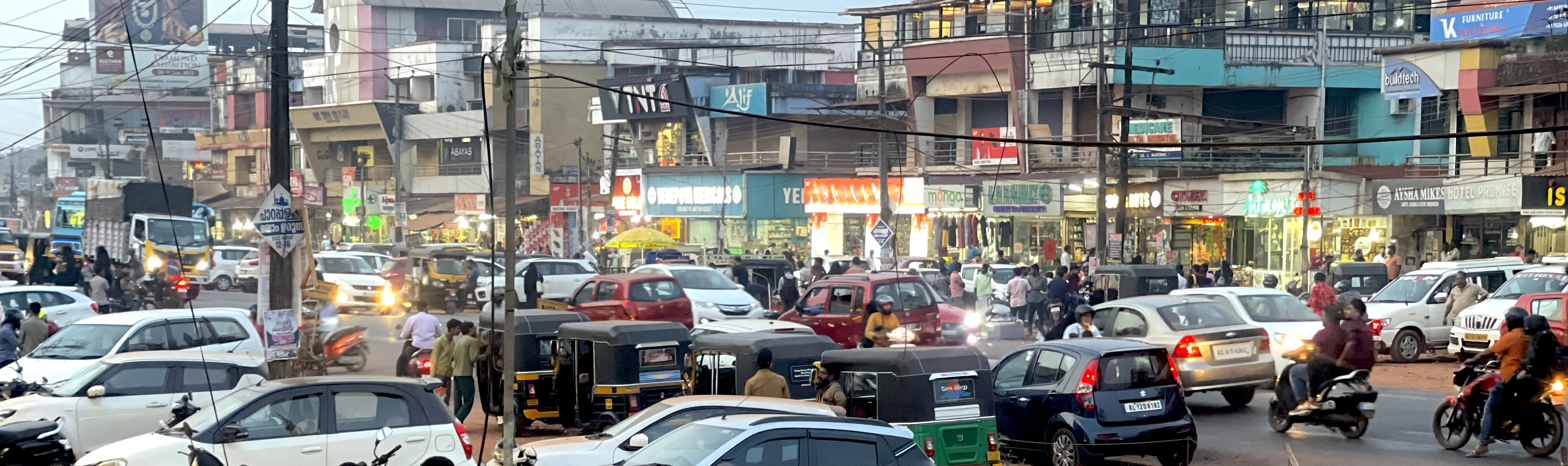
The buzzing Bazaar

== Geography ==
The geographical coordinates of Uppala are: 12° 68' 0" North, 75° 54' 0" East.

Uppala lies in the western coast of south India, between the Western Ghats and the Arabian Sea. Uppala River is also known as Kalai River, originates from the Veerakamba Hills in Karnataka. Uppala River enters Kerala through Manjeshwar thaluk(Uppala) in Kasaragod and finally ends near Uppala Gate. The length of the river is about 50 km. The Uppala River originates at about 150 m height from the sea level. Uppala river constitutes about 50 square kilometres in Kasaragod district. Hence it is the 25th largest river in kerala state.

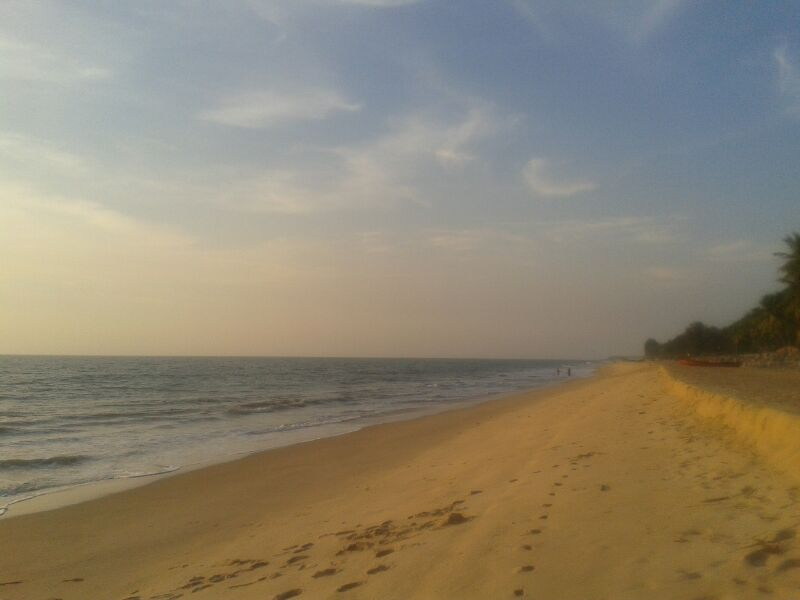
Uppala Beach at sunset

Uppala's beaches include Uppala Beach, Aila Beach, Moosodi Beach and fishing zone, Ayyoor-Parakkatta Beach, Ayyoor-Peringady beach and Berika Beach.

Uppala is the neighbouring town for Kumbla, Bandiyod, Manjeshwar, Paivalike, Puttur, Vittal, Kasaragod and Mangalore.

Suburbs of the town include Cherugoli (Mangalpady), Deenar Nagar, Uppala Gate, Hanafi Bazar, Nayabazar, Moosodi, Hanuman nagar, Kondevoor, Kodibail, Songal, Kodanga, Pathwadi, Baliyoor, Mulinja, Mannamkuzhi, Bappaithotti, Manimunda, Kukkar, Kaikamba (Bombay Bazar), Turti, Bhagavathi, Kuntupuni, vikram bazar, Hidayath Bazar, Hidayath Nagar, Pachilampara, Aila, Kuntupuni, Hajimalang Road, Bekoor, Kubanoor, Kedakkar .

== Climate ==
Uppala has a tropical climate. In most months, it receives significant rainfall. There is only a short dry season and it is not very effective. The Köppen-Geiger climate classification is Am. The average annual temperature in Uppala is 27.1 °C. About 5277 mm of precipitation falls annually.

The driest month is February, with 5 mm of precipitation. Most precipitation falls in July, with an average of 1560 mm.

The warmest month of the year is April, with an average high temperature of 33.8 °C. In January, the average low temperature is 22 °C. This is the lowest average temperature of the year.

The difference in precipitation between the driest month and the wettest month is 701 mm. The average high temperatures vary during the year by 11.8 °C.

Climate data for Uppala, India
Month	Jan	Feb	Mar	Apr	May	Jun	Jul	Aug	Sep	Oct	Nov	Dec	Year
Mean daily maximum °C (°F)	33 (91)	33 (91)	33 (91)	33.8 (92.8)	32 (90)	29 (84)	28 (82)	28.3 (82.9)	29 (84)	31.1 (88.0)	32.5 (90.5)	32.6 (90.7)	33.8 (92.8)
Mean daily minimum °C (°F)	22 (72)	23 (73)	25 (77)	26 (79)	27 (81)	25 (77)	25 (77)	24.3 (75.7)	23.9 (75.0)	24.2 (75.6)	23.8 (74.8)	23 (73)	22 (72)
Average rainfall mm (inches)	22.2 (0.87)	5.74 (0.23)	16.54 (0.65)	56.1 (2.21)	224.5 (8.84)	1,217.4 (47.93)	1,560.2 (61.43)	1,129.4 (44.46)	571.2 (22.49)	313.2 (12.33)	125.2 (4.93)	36.4 (1.43)	5,277.6 (207.78)
Average rainy days (≥ 0.1 mm)	4	2	7	7	21	30	31	30	26	25	17	10	210
Average relative humidity (%)	68	68	71	71	76	83	85	85	84	80	74	69	71
Source: worldweatheronline.com

== Demographics ==
As of the 2011 Indian census, Uppala census town had population of 15,498 which constitutes 7,312 males and 8,185 females. Uppala census town has an area of 5.45 km^{2} (2.10 sq mi) with 3,057 households. The male female sex ratio was 1119 women per 1000 men higher than state average of 1084. In Uppala, 14.03% of the population was under 6 years of age. Uppala had an average literacy of 91.2% higher than the national average of 74% and lower than state average of 94%: male literacy was 95.5% and female literacy was 87.5%. People in Uppala speak many languages including Malayalam, Urdu, Tulu and Kannada.

Religions in Uppala town

source:Uppala Town Population Census 2011 - 2024
1. Muslims (74.5%)
2. Hindu (25.2%)
3. Christians (0.11%)
4. Jains (0.02%)
5. Not stated (0.00%)
6. Sikh (0.02%)
7. Buddhist (0.00%)
8. Other (0.09%)

== Civic administration ==
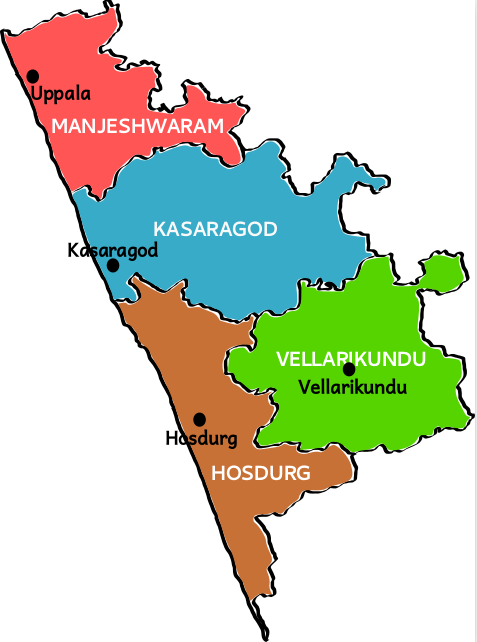
Taluks in Kasargod

Uppala is a taluk headquarters of Manjeshwaram Taluk, Kasaragod. The taluk office is at Main Junction, Uppala. Other government institutes in Uppala are Village office, which is in Nayabazar, Mangalpady Panchayath office at Nayabazar, Fire and Rescue station at Ambar, Community Health Center at Nayabazar, AEO'S Office, Uppala Post office, Mangalpady Post Office, Krishi Bhavan at Ambar and veterinary hospital at Ambar.

Uppala also has K.S.E.B. on Pathwadi road, Kerala Water Authority Pump House at Cherugoli, cultural centre and library at Nayabazar, Lion's Club at Nayabazar, and Govt Kerosene Supply bunk at Ambar.

== Transportation ==
=== Air ===
The nearest airport to Uppala is Mangalore International Airport, which is around 37 km away from the town. Kannur International Airport, which opened in late 2018 is 143 km away from the town. Other airports near Uppala are Calicut International Airport, about 225 km to the south; and Mysore Airport, around 255 km to the south east.

=== Road ===
Uppala is situated on NH-66 . It has a bus station and has a minute to minute bus facility to Kasaragod and Mangalore. Uppala is well connected by road to Mangalore, Udupi, Manipal, Puttur, Kasaragod, Kannur, Calicut, Kochi and Thiruvananthapuram.

Uppala-Bayar road connects Uppala with Paivalike, Bayar and leads to Kanyana, Vittal and Puttur in Dakshina Kannada district, Karnataka. Uppala bus station also provides buses to Puttur via Paivalike, Uppala to Badiyadka, Heroor and many other places. Buses which moves from Mangalore to Thiruvananthapuram stops in Uppala Bus Station. There are both private and government buses. Taxi facilities are available in the town. There are a few auto sheds in the town, which have autorickshaws.

=== Rail ===
Uppala has a railway station, west from the heart of the town, where the passenger and only one express train stop. Most of the students and workers travels daily by train to Mangalore from Uppala.

The station's main problem is lack of train service (train stops). Only few trains stop at Uppala railway station, and express trains do not stop here, affecting thousands of daily passengers. Railway authorities degrades this station without providing enough express train stops, ignoring people’s proposal for voluntarily making reservation facility here which could have proved the high revenue potential of this station and by providing more importance to neighboring Manjeshwaram and Kumbala stations even though Uppala has more potential than these two places.

The station was built during British India. It is historically important because of its design of construction and structure. It lies between Kumbla and Manjeshwaram railway station (10 km).

The railway station does not have basic infrastructure facilities like reservation facility, triple tracks, better language service, rest rooms, security force, complaint service, canteen, shops, etc.

=== Sea ===
The State Government have built a new port capable of 275 boats in Moosodi near Manjeshwar.

New Mangalore Port is the neso to Uppala, which is around 33 km to the nor and has another in Kasaragod in the South th

== Economy ==
Uppala is the destination for all the shoppers from north Kasaragod region . The shop category mainly includes fashion, jewellery, food and automobile.

Uppala has a few private high schools but lacks enough quality pre-degree college and degree colleges for higher studies, which forces a huge number of students to rely on the neighbouring states like Karnataka.

Uppala is also home to many multi-millionaires, but the town lacks the basic infrastructure like quality hospitals, pre-degree colleges, degree colleges, waste management systems, proper two laned road connectivity with neighbouring places, Railway ROBs, a better railway station or municipality status due to lack of vision from their government leaders.

== Education and health ==
=== Hospitals ===
Uppala has small and old government hospital at Nayabazar. Small private hospitals like KNH Hospital at Uppala railway station road and Health Care Center has got underwhelming health infrastructure and cleanliness for present standards. Hence the people in town are forced to travel to nearby towns and cities for medical purposes, which are not in less than 20 km radius of Uppala.

=== Education ===
This town also has one of the fine education centres in the district. These centres serves education for many students in the region. Most students here do 10th grade from these centres and favour colleges in Mangalore for their higher education.

== See also ==
- List of cities and towns in Kasaragod district
