= Kadri Manjunath Temple =

Coordinates: 12°53′8.8″N 74°51′20.1″E

Kadri Manjunatha Temple
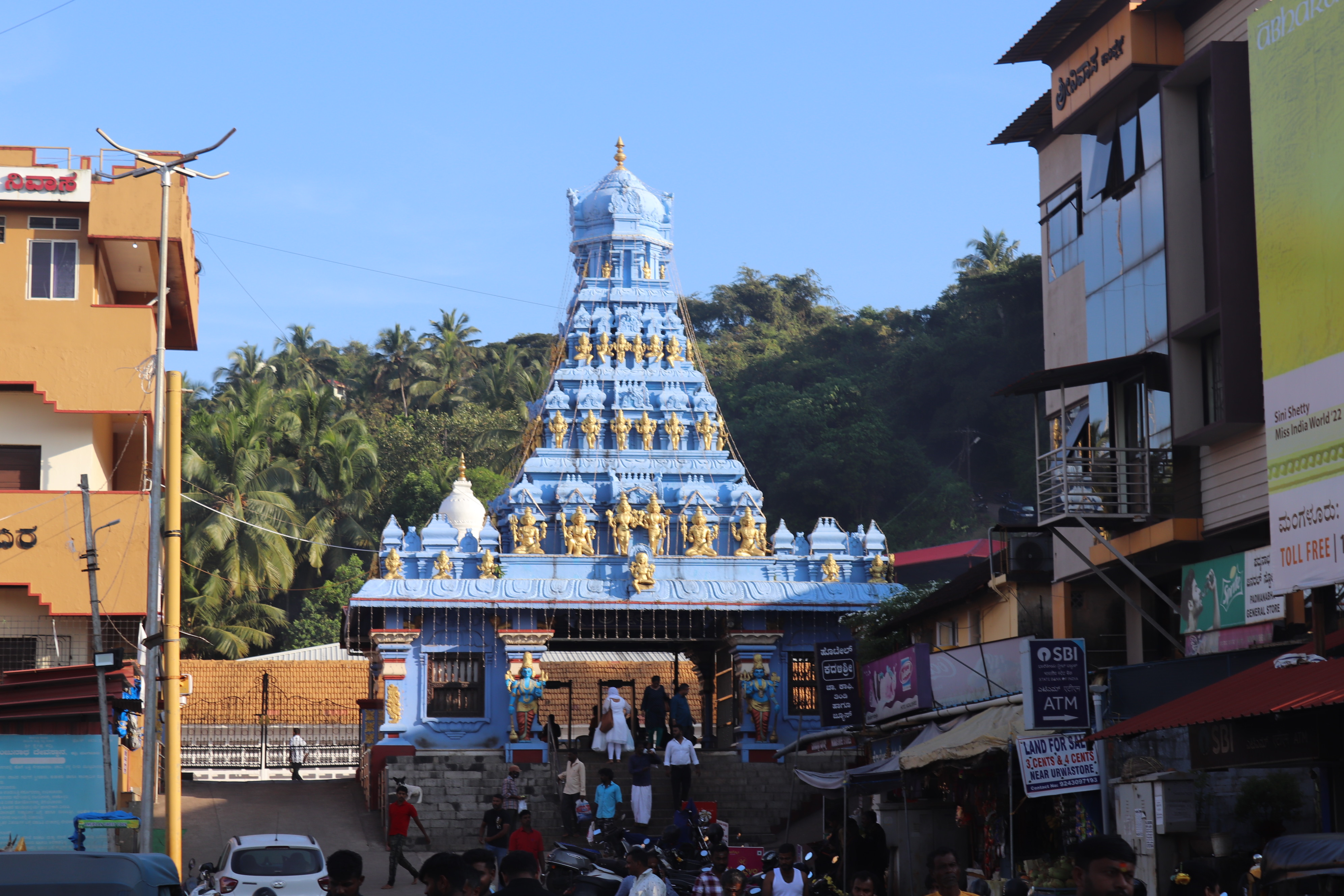

Religion
- Affiliation: Hinduism
- District: Dakshina Kannada
- Deity: Manjunatha (Lord Shiva)

Location
- Location: Kadri, Mangalore
- State: Karnataka
- Interactive map of Kadri Manjunatha Temple

Kadri Manjunatha Temple is a historic temple in Mangaluru in the state of Karnataka, India. The incharge and priests in the temple are Shivalli Madhva Brahmins.

== History ==
The temple of Manjunatheshwara on the hills of Kadri is said to be built during the 10th or 11th century. It was converted to a complete stone structure during the 14th century.

The bronze (panchlauha) idol of Lokeshwar (identified as Brahma), about 5 feet high, of the temple is called as oldest of the South Indian temples. It has an inscription dated 968 CE (or 1068 CE), engraved on the pedestal. The inscription states that King Kundavarma of the Alupa Dynasty installed the Lokeshwara idol in Kadarika Vihara. It mentions Mangaluru as "Mangalapura". The image has three faces and six arms, and holds and hold flowers in two of the arms. The crown depicts a Dhyani Buddha. The image has an ornate prabhavali, and two attendants. It is very well preserved with enameled eyes. There exist two other undated bronze images of similar craftsmanship, one of them is identifiable as an Avalokiteshwar (called Narayana) and other as Buddha (called Vedavyasa). Another stone inscription in Tulu, Kannada and Malayalam scripts of 12-13th century CE, in temple's kitchen, states that the ruler and the local landlords contributed land for the temple. A 1730 CE text Kadli Manjunath Mahatmyam gives an account of the association with Natha Mantha.

It is believed that Parashurama who was living in Sahyadri, killed the Kshathriyas who were cruel and donated the lands to Kashyapa. He prayed to Lord Shiva for a place to live. Lord Shiva assured Parashurama that if he performed a penance at Kadali Kshethra, Lord Shiva would reincarnate as Manjunatha for the betterment of the world. As per Shiva's orders Parashurama threw his axe into the sea and created a place for his penance. Yielding to Parashurama's prayers Lord Shiva appeared to him as Manjunatha with Goddess Parvathi and stayed at Kadri for the betterment of the world. As per the orders of Manjunatha the Sapthakoti Manthras become the seven Theerthas.

This temple has Hindu and Buddhist histories. Buddhism was practised here till the 10th century CE. In spite of the decline of Buddhism elsewhere, devotion to the Buddhist figures of Manjusri and Avalokiteśvara continued in this region. The Nath cult was partly oriented towards Buddhism as well as the Tantric Shiva tradition. As a result, many Buddhist temples were taken over by Hindu traditions. According to M. Govinda Pai this temple was known as Kadri Manjunatha where is Manjunatha relates to Shiva and Kadri is derived from Kadri Vihara which was Buddhist monastery of the Vajrayana cult.

King Kundavarma of the Alupa dynasty left an inscription on the base of the Avalokiteśvara image stating he was devotee of Shiva. This image was not of Buddha, but of Bodhisattva, who was being worshiped as integrated form of Shiva. Further M. Govinda Pai has concluded this was center of Bodhisattva Manjusri's cult. And later on this Bodhisattvas were identified as Saivite deities. Shiv linga and Bodhisattva were worshiped together for centuries at this place until it was converted completely to a Saivite temple. Kadarika Vihara provides firm inscriptional evidence for this transformation.

In front of the temple, at a height there are a number of water ponds. There's a garden surrounding the ponds. When one walks down from there in front of the temple is a huge lightpole. During karthika maasa, deepothsava is held here. There are statues of Machendranath, Gorakanath, Shringinath, Lokeshwara, Manjushri, and Buddha in the temple.

== Description ==
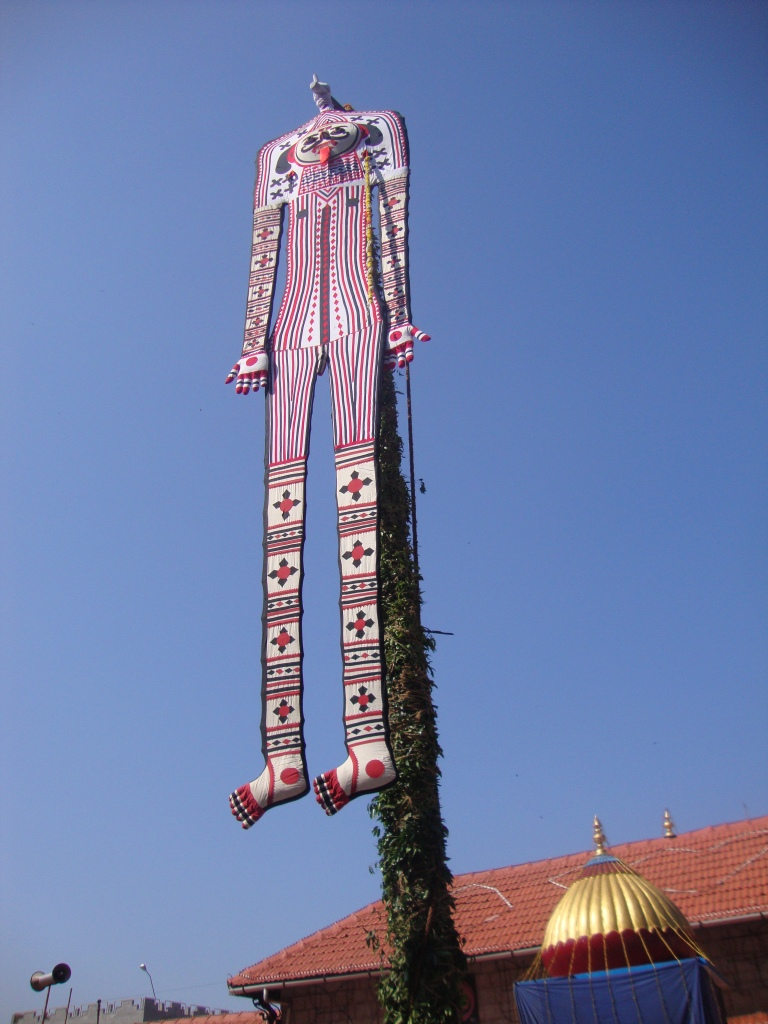
A view near Kadri Manjunath temple

The chief deity of this temple is Manjunatha, which incorporates a Shiva linga. The statue of Lokeshwara in the seated position with three faces and six arms is tipped to be the best bronze statue in India according to the Deccan Herald. It is about 1.5 meter tall.

== Gomukha and water tanks ==
There is a natural spring at an elevated location at the back of the temple. It is called Gomukha. It is believed that the water flows from Bhageerathi river, in Kashi and thereby it gets its name as Kashi Bhageerathi theertha. The water from this spring is let into nine ponds of different sizes adjacent to it. Visitors wash themselves in these ponds before entering the main temple.

== Annual festival ==
Annual Jathra Mahothsava is held during the month of January. Nine days of festival starts on the day of Makara Sankranthi. Bhandara of Malaraya Daiva is paraded from Kadri Kambala Ganada Kottige house ( G.K House kadri kambla, initiative led by DK Ashok) hasiru hore kanikey (requirements of mass feedings) is pompously carried forward. Theertha snana is held at morning, followed by dwajasthambha arohana, lighting of kanchi sthambha, and bali uthsava on the same day.

== Savari Bali ==
Uthsava bali is held for four days, where lord Manjunatha consecutively visits four kattas in the four directions.

1. Bikarnakatte savari
2. Mallikatte savari
3. Mundana katte savari
4. Konchadi katte savari

On the seventh day of festival, after the savari's "Seventh Deepothsava" is held and "Maha Anna Samtharpaney" (mass feeding) is held.

Thousands of people assemble to get fed by the delicacies of prasadam offered.

=== Maha rathothsava ===
Following day of mass feeding, Maha manmaharathothsava, chariot uthsava is held. Devotees all over the world assemble to seek the blessings of lord Shree Manjunatha and to be a part of the grand ceremony.

BELLI RATHOTHSAVA or silver chariot uthsava is then followed.

AVABRITHA SNANA DAY

Thulabhara seve, Avabritha snana, Chandramandalothsava, and Dhwaja arohana is held.

"MALARAYA DAIVA NEMOTHSAVA"

Parva is held for Malaraya daiva, the right servant and Anappa daiva, the left servant of Manjunatha God. Procession of the bhandara from temple to kadri hills where nemothsava is held in the daivasthana for Malaraya and bhanta daiva. After the nemothsava the bhandara is brought back to G.K House kadri kambla, from where it was originally brought from.

Under the guidance of Sudhakar rao Pejawar and mallika kala vrinda, cultural programs are held daily during the annual festival.

Delicious meals or anna prasadham is fed to all the devotees during jathra mahothsava.

Maha pooja, Uthsava bali, Nithya bali, Bhootha bali is held daily.

== See also ==
- Polali Rajarajeshwari Temple
- Sri Gopalakrishna Temple Kumble
- Madhur Temple
- Avalokiteśvara
