= Mappila Theyyam =

Ritual dance worship

Mappila Theyyams are a variant of Theyyam performed in North Malabar especially in Kasaragod district. It is related to the Mappila Muslims of Malabar Coast. This Theyyam is deified by Mavilan, Koppalan and Vannan communities and is done with the cooperation of Hindus and Muslims. The characters of this theyyam are mostly spirits of Mappilas that are related to the local deities. The common names of male Mappila theyyams are Aali, Aandi, Mukri, Poker, Bappiriyan, Kunhali, Mammu, Mammad etc. Ummachi and Naithiyar are the common names attributed to female theyyams.The dialogues of Mappila theyyams have mentions about Islamic migration to Kerala in the 7th century and communal harmony.

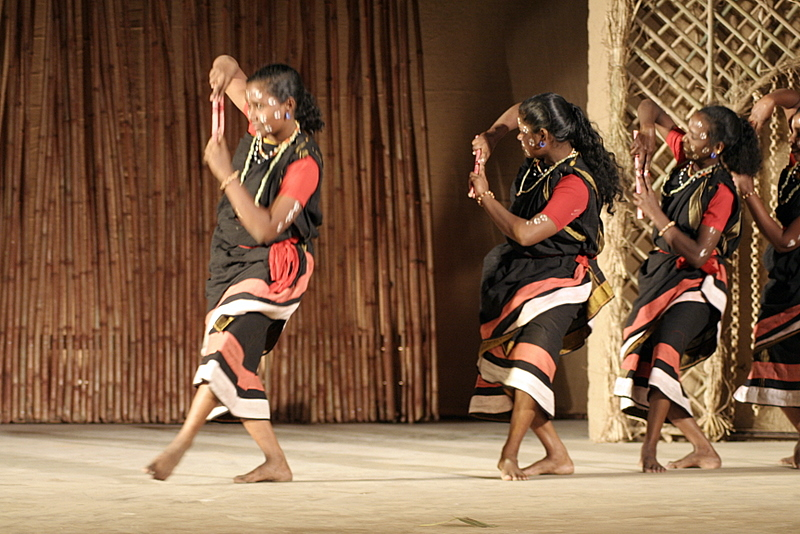
Mavilan Dancers

== Legend ==
The origins of the legend of Mappila Theyyam traces to the kuladevata temple of Kamballur Kottayil Tharavad in Chittarikkal, Kasaragod district. The main deity of the temple is Karinchamundi however, as per folklore the spirit of an mukri of nearby Pulingome Mosque named Kalanthan who died under mysterious circumstances in nearby river is also merged with the main deity. In the annual theyyam proceedings of this temple Kalanthan mukri is represented as Mappila Theyyam along with the Chamundi theyyam. The mappila theyyam starts the divine act by offering banku (prayer call) and offering namaz. It has less ornamentation, facial drawings and captive head gears than Chamundi theyyakolam. This art form represents the syncretism of Mappila Muslims and harmony between Muslims and Hindus that existed in the region since olden times. The ritual traditions of Pulingome Mosque also has similar harmonious elements. The annual Makham Uroos conducted in the mosque begins with cooperation of seniors of Kamballur Kottayil Tharavadu.

== Other Mappila Theyyam ==
There are almost fifteen Mappila Theyyams that are practiced across areas that were under Kolathunadu in Kasaragod district and parts of Kannur district. . The most famous among them besides Kamballur Kottayil Chamundi theyyam are,

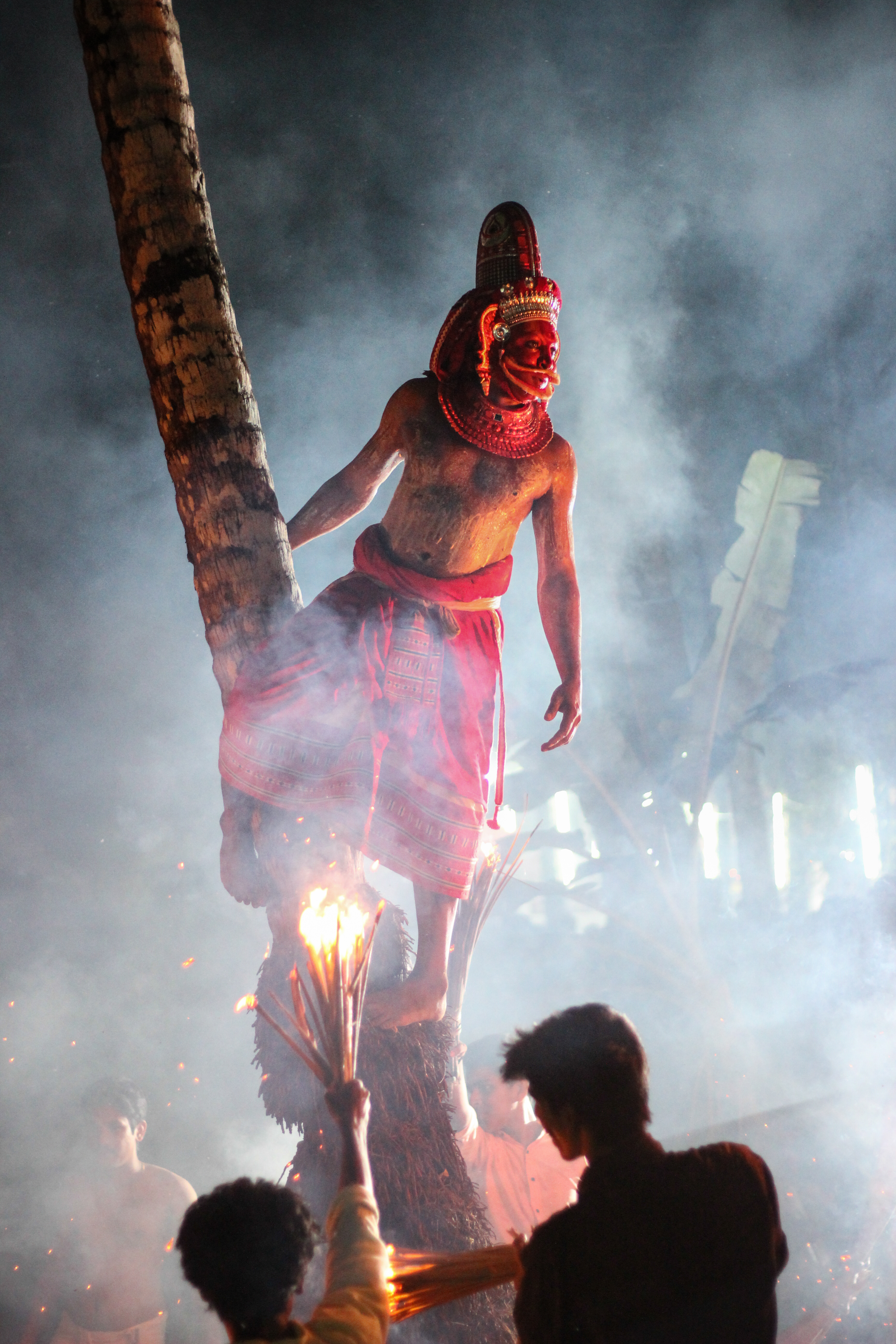
Bappiriyan Theyyam climbing coconut tree at Muchiriyan kavu, Azhikode, Kannur

- Aalitheyyam practiced in Kumbla performed by members of Vannan caste is linked with the legend of Naduvilan tharavad, Arikady.
- Bappiriyan Theyyam practiced in Kannur district, Manjeshwar etc. It has decorated head gear.
- Koyi Mammad Theyyam at Mouveni Sree Devi Kovilakam in Narkkilakad, Chittarikkal.
- Naithiyar Theyyam of Ettikulam, Ramanthali
- Ummachi Theyyam practiced in areas of Allada Swaroopam.
- Beevi Theyyam at Pappinisseri

== See also ==
- Temples of Kerala
- Uttama Villain
- Padayani
- Neeliyar Bhagavathi
- Thirayattam
- Thiyyar history
- Islam in Kerala
- Theyyam
