= Arya Poonkani =

Regional Hindu goddess

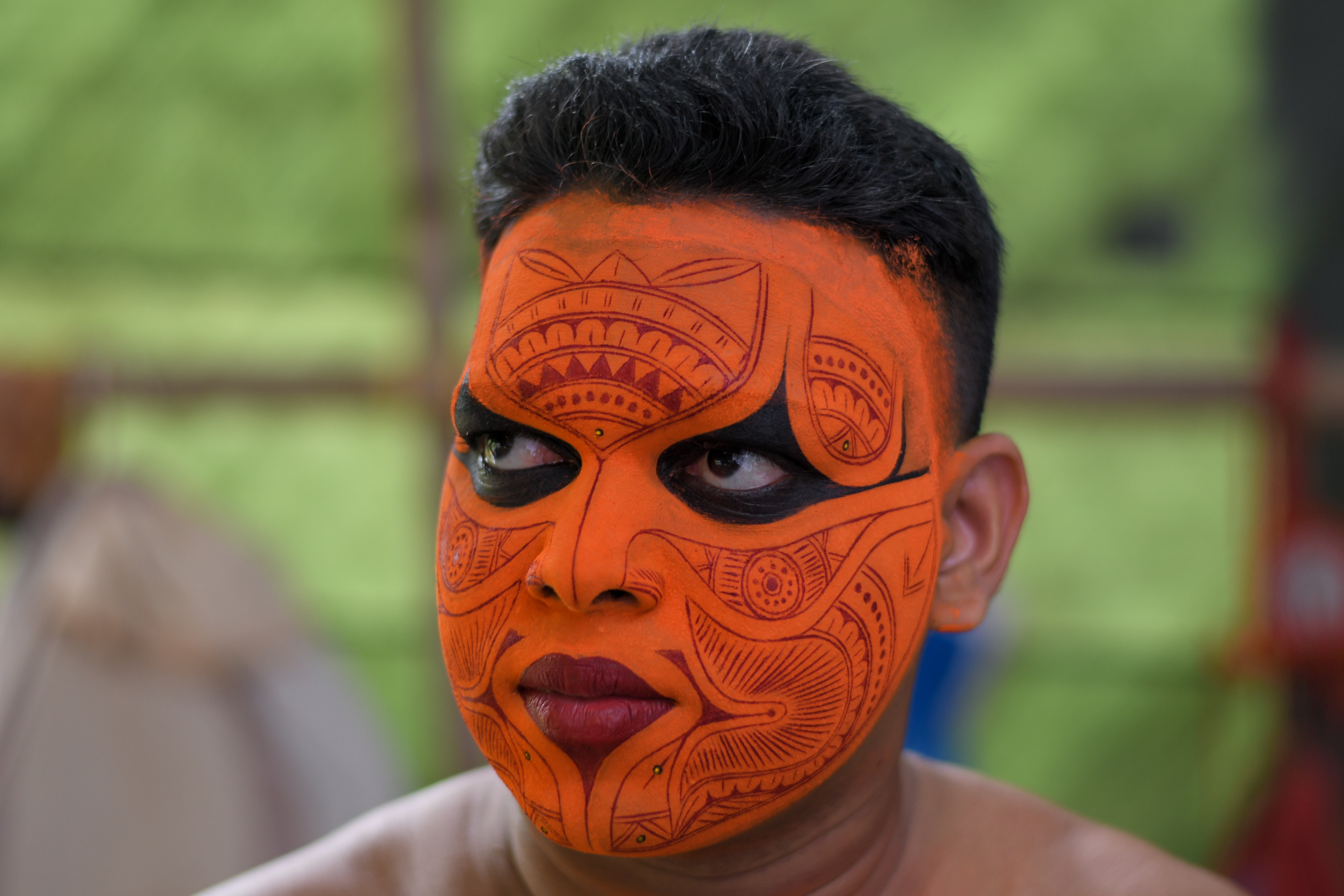
- A theyyam performer with face art of Arya Poonkani theyyam
- Affiliation: Hinduism
- Region: North Malabar, Kerala, India

Arya Poonkani, also known as Aryakkarakani, is a female deity worshiped in the North Malabar region in Kerala, India. Arya Poonkani is worshipped and performed as Arya Poonkani Theyyam. With the theyyam of Arya Poonkani, Bappiriyan Theyyam is also performed in the shrine.

== Myth ==
According to the myths, Arya Poonkani was born as the daughter of Aryapattar and Aryapattathi. As she grew up, she became obsessed with ornaments and jewels.

Arya Poonkani and her brothers, who were travelling in search of pearls for her marriage, got caught in a storm and were separated by a shipwreck. They took hold of the wreckage of the wrecked ship and spent seven days at sea, and on the eighth day they all came ashore. When they reached the shore, they separated from each other.

Arya Poonkani, worried by the sea, sees Bappiriyan, a Muslim sailor going in a small boat in the sea. At first he ignores Arya Poonkani's call for help, but she surprises him with her magical skills and takes Bappiriyan with her to rush his brothers. Finally they find her brothers in Venmalatinkara, but they were not ready to go with her and decided to settle there. Then Arya Poonkani and Bappiriyan continues the journey and reaches the Kooran hills on the North Malabar coast. There they are enshrined in the Thaliparamba Kaithakeel temple. After the shrine in Thaliparamba, many other shrines built across the North Malabar region.

== Theyyam ==
Aryakarakanni is a theyyam with very beautiful facial art and slow movements. Unlike most of the other theyyam who perform without any footwear, Arya Poonkani theyyam appear wearing a traditional footwear made of wood. Bappiriyan the sailor, is also performed as theyyam from where Arya Poonkani theyyam is performed. The myth of Bappiriyan, who is believed to be a Muslim and Arya Poonkani, a Hindu goddess is an example of Hindu-Islamic religious harmony in Kerala.
