= Thalangara Thoppi =

Thalangara Thoppi (Thalangara Cap) is a traditional hand-made prayer cap of Muslims made at Thalangara, in the southern side of Kasaragod town of Kerala. This caps are made out of pure cotton and have found mention even in the 14th century writings of Ibn Battuta. It is also called as Omani caps in Gulf Cooperation Council countries.

== Significance ==
This caps are made out of pure cotton and they have stiff sides and designs like Persian prayer rugs. Before mechanized Taqiyah (cap) manufacturing, this caps were widely exported to Persian Gulf Southeast Asia and North Africa. Presently the bulk arrival of caps from Bangladesh and China have reduced demand and production of caps from Thalangara. A single Thalangara cap has exquisite detailing and it requires 15 – 20 days of hand work and it costs 5 times the price of a machine made cap. There is currently only a single craftsman named Abdul Raheem in Thalangara who manufacture this caps.

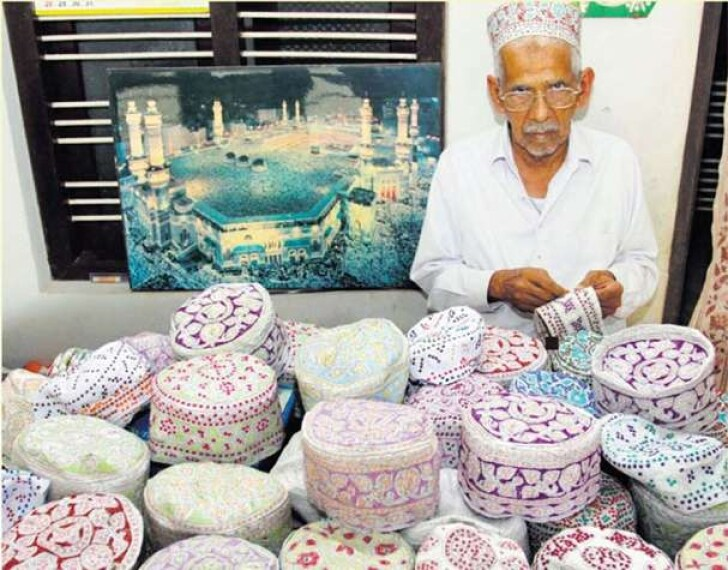
Renowned Thalangara thoppi craftsman Aboobacker Musaliyar

In olden times cap making was a very active cottage industry in the region employing significant numbers. There are many who buy this caps as souvenirs during the visit to Malik Dinar Mosque in Ramadan month. It is one among the remarkable Islamic traditions in Malabar in lines of Beypore Uru, Koyilandy hookah, Mappila Theyyam etc.

== See also ==
- Malik Dinar
