= Arikady Fort =

Fort in India

Arikady Fort / Kumbla Fort
- Arikady, Kumbla, Kasaragod district
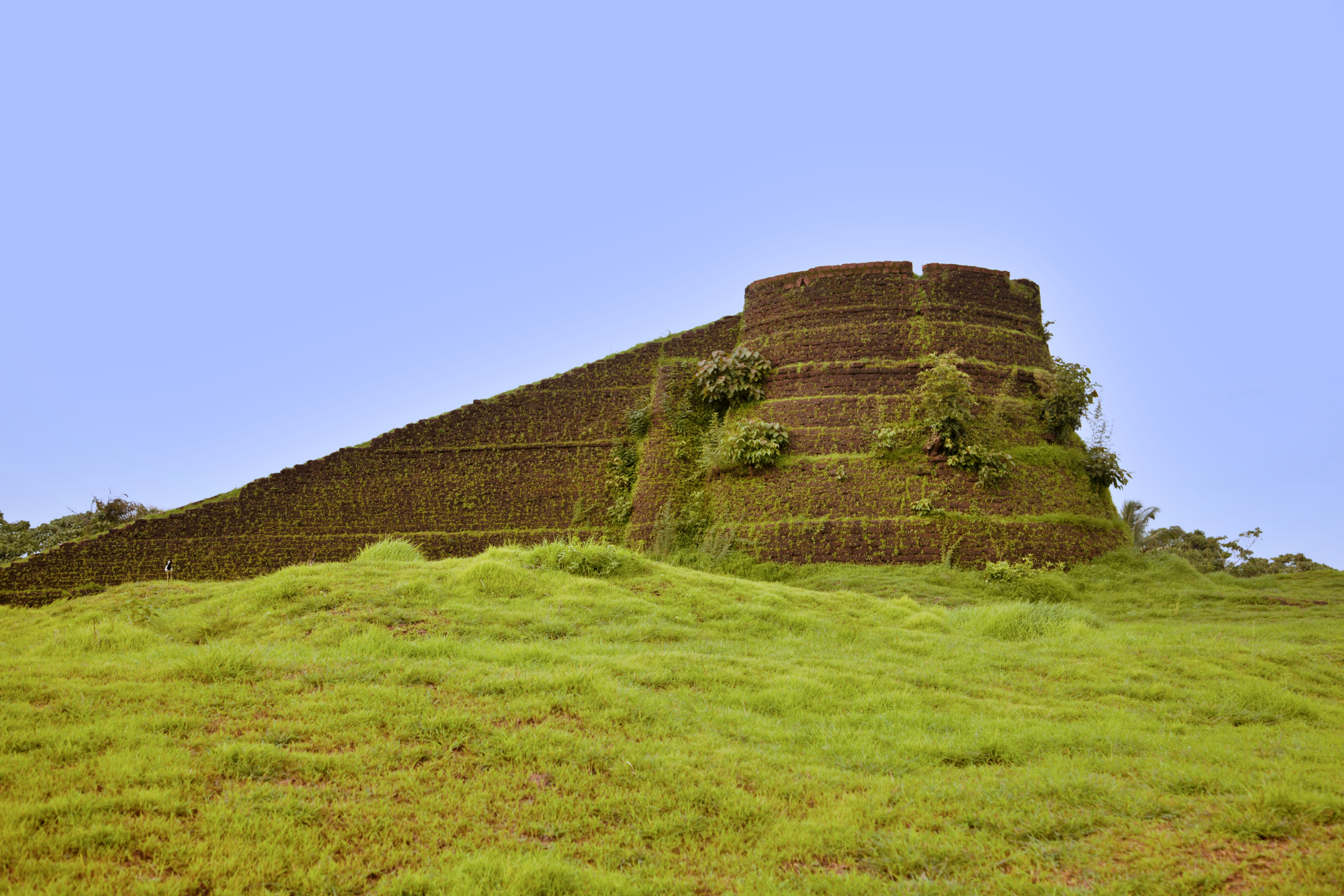
- Arikady fort

Site information
- Open to the public: Yes

Location
- Location of the fort
- Coordinates: 12.618380°N 74.945290°E

Arikadi Fort is a fort located in the Kasaragod district of Kerala, India. It is also known as Kumbla Fort. The fort is located at a distance of 1 km from Kumbla on the NH 66 National Highway between kumbala River and shiriya River There is a Hanuman temple just below the fort.

Excavations by a team from the Department of Archeology, University of Kerala in 2015 uncovered a large hall possibly meant for congregation. The excavation was carried out as part of the 'A Survey of Forts' research project jointly funded by the University Grants Commission (UGC) and the University of Kerala. Excavations have also uncovered large quantities of roof tiles, local pottery, Chinese pottery, lead bullets and the mold used to make them.

== Geography ==
The fort is located in the Arikady village in Kumbla, Kasaragod district. The nearest railway station and busstand is at Kumbla and the nearest airport is Mangalore International Airport. The fort is located on a lateritic hillock on the right bank of the Arikady River.

== History ==
According to the South Canara Manual, the Keladi Nayakas (1500–1763) who had their capitals at Keladi, Ikkeri and Bednore in Karnataka built few forts in the Hosdurg-Kasargod region of Kerala. Arikadi Fort is one of them. According to historical records, Arikady Fort was built by Ikeri Hiriya Venkadappa Nayak in 1608. In the second volume of the South Canara District Manual, Stuart records that there was an inscription in Kannada at the entrance to the fort, which states that the fort was built by Nayak.

Other histories are also being told. Most commonly, it is believed that the fort was built during the reign of Tipu Sultan. Another belief is that it was built for the headquarters of the Kumbala dynasty. Another belief is that the fort existed during the reign of the Kolathiri Rajas and that after the collapse of the Kolathiri kingdom and the Vijayanagara Empire, the area came under the control of the Ikkeri Nayakas and they rebuilt the forts.

Some historians say that the fort was under the rule of the Maypadi Kovilakam, which had jurisdiction from Kumbala to the Chandragiri river. The area was under their control during the heyday of the Vijayanagara Empire, which was later handed over to the Nayaks of Bednore and the local king acted as their feudatory. After the fall of the Vijayanagara Empire, it fell into the hands of the Mysore rulers and after the defeat of Tipu Sultan by the British, the fort fell to the British control.
