= Polali Rajarajeshwari Temple =

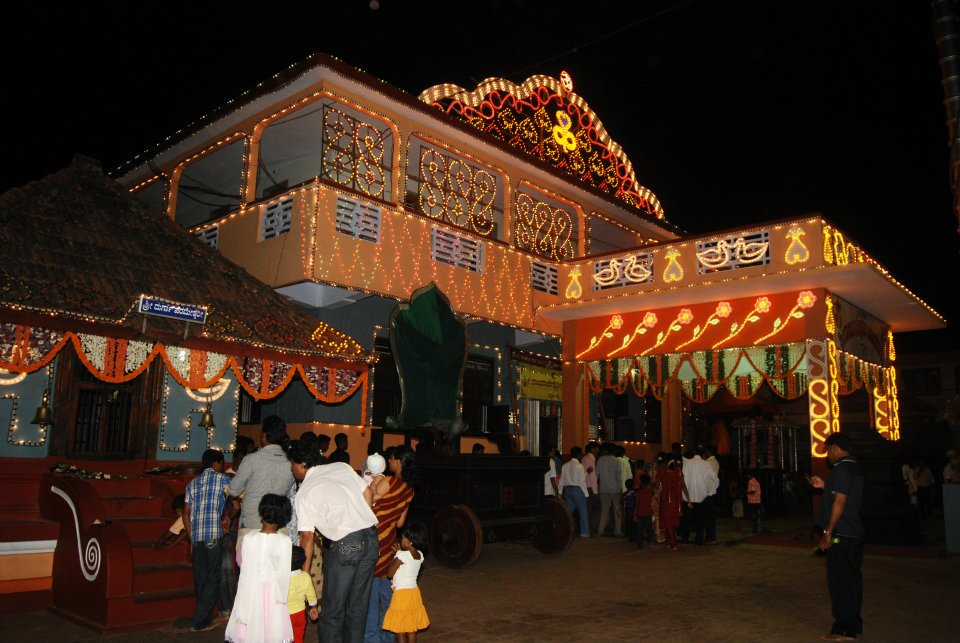
- Polali Rajarajeshwari Temple during festival

- Location in Karnataka

Religion
- Affiliation: Hinduism
- District: Dakshina Kannada district
- Deity: Shri Rajarajeshwari Subramanya
- Festival: Polali Chendu festival
- Features: Tower: Simha; Temple tank: Phalguni

Location
- Location: Polali
- State: Karnataka
- Country: India
- Coordinates: 12.933954°N 74.955291°E

Architecture
- Type: Hindu architecture
- Creator: King Suratha
- Completed: 8th Century AD

Specifications
- Direction of façade: Sitting
- Temple: 1
- Monument: 2
- Inscriptions: Ashoka inscriptions

Polali Rajarajeshwari Temple is a temple in Polali, Dakshina Kannada district in Karnataka.

== Etymology ==
The place where the temple was located was known as Pural in ancient times. The word Pural means Flute in Tulu language. The origin of the word Pural is the Mugera language. The word Pural or Purel also has the meaning of changing sides, which may also apply in this case as the river takes an abrupt turn near the temple. In Sanskrit, it was referred to as Paliapura, which later came to be known as Polali in Kannada. In several ancient epigraphs and records, the main deity of the temple was referred to as Porala Devi.

== History ==
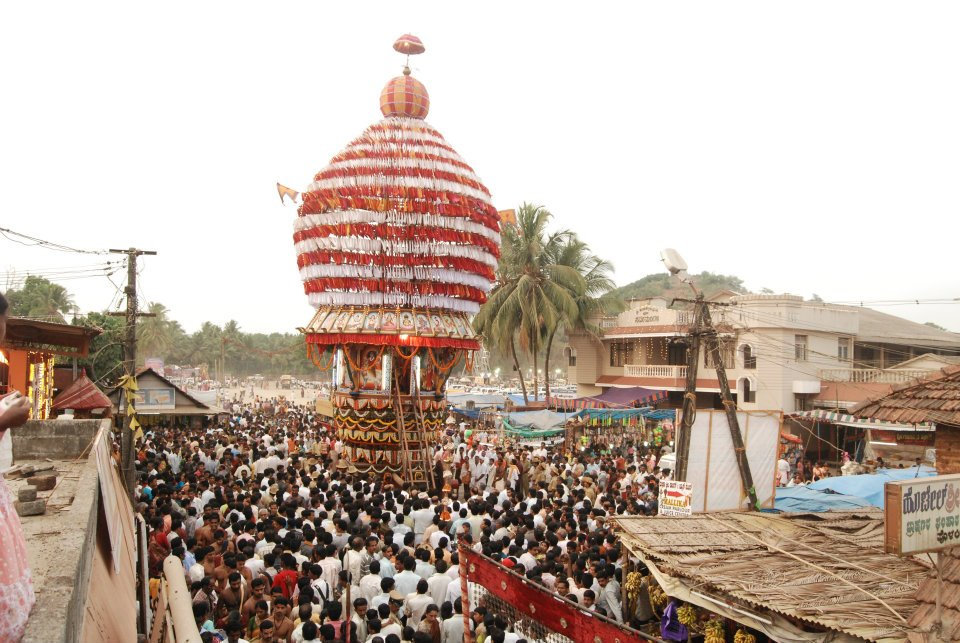
Temple car festival

According to an inscription discovered in the vicinity of the temple, the temple around the clay idol was built in 8th century AD. It is a widely held belief that the temple was built by King Suratha, and that the king offered his own crown, studded with precious jewels,

== Architecture ==
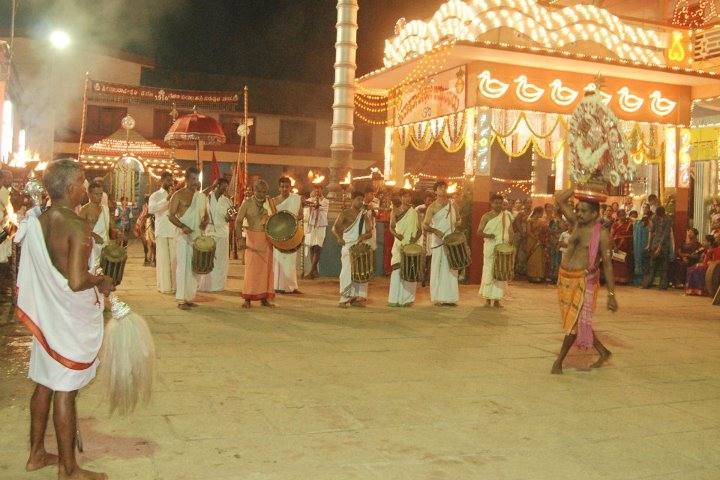
Temple bali

Records written by Abdul Razzak in 1448 suggest that the temple was initially built from molten brass. He recorded that the temple had four platforms. An image of the deity, 5 to 6 feet in height, with red rubies for eyes were present on the highest of the platforms. Today, the idol of the main deity, Shri Rajarajeshwari is a stucco image of the deity with a height of 10 feet. The clay used for making the idol was specially prepared with herbal mixtures for added strength. The temple also has smaller idols for other deities including Subramanya, Bhadhrakali, Mahaganapathi and Saraswathi. During a religious event named Lepashta Gandha, the idols are coated with a special soil mixture with eight medicinal properties once every 12 years. The soil used for coating was prepared hundreds of years ago and not prepared freshly on each occasion. The roof of Mukhamantapa, a section of the temple has many Gods and Goddesses exquisitely carved in wood. The roofs of other sections of the temple like the Dhwajastambha, the Garbagriha and the Pillar of lights are covered in copper plates.

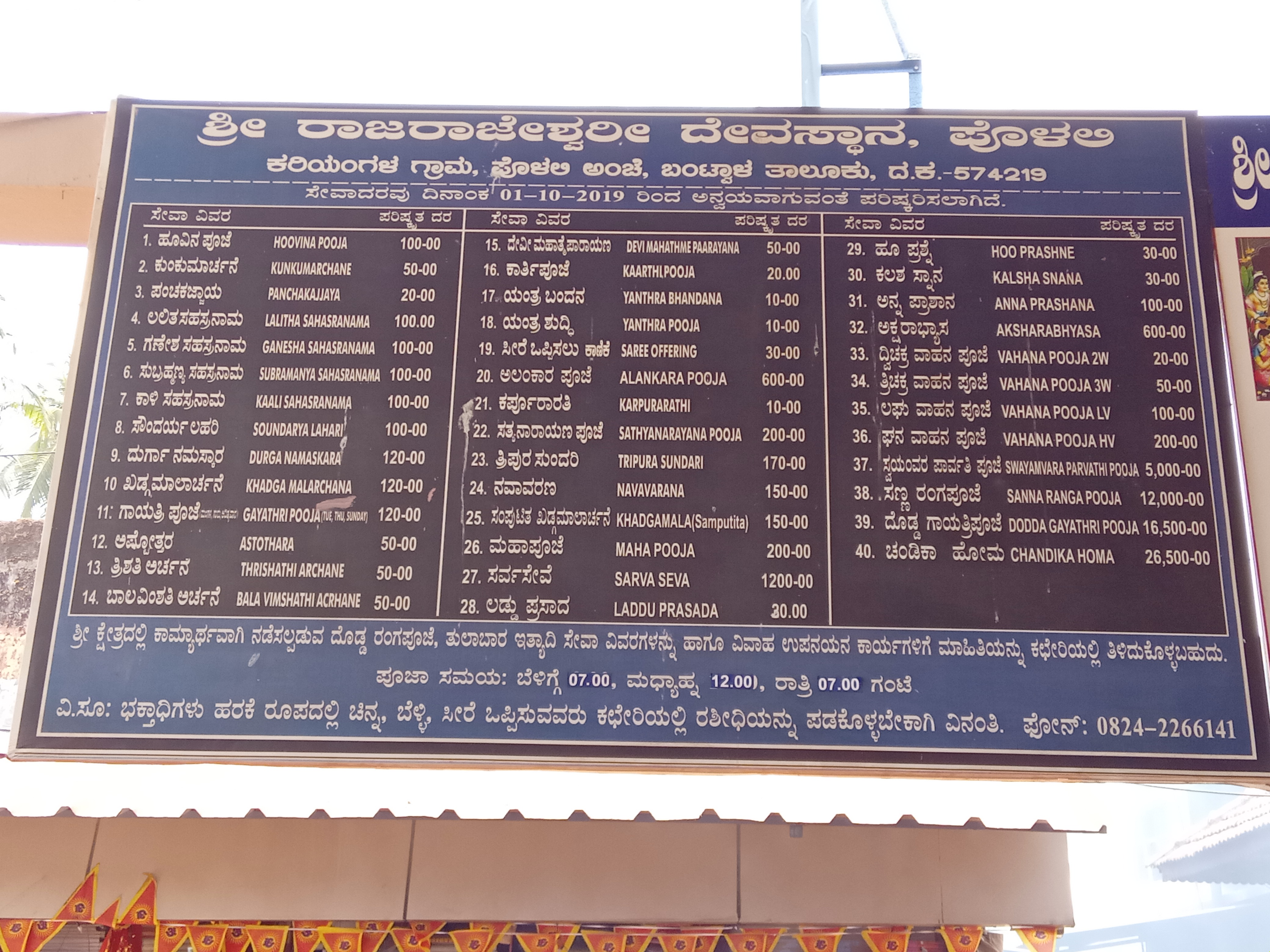
pooja details at sri rajarajeswari temple

== Polali Chendu festival ==
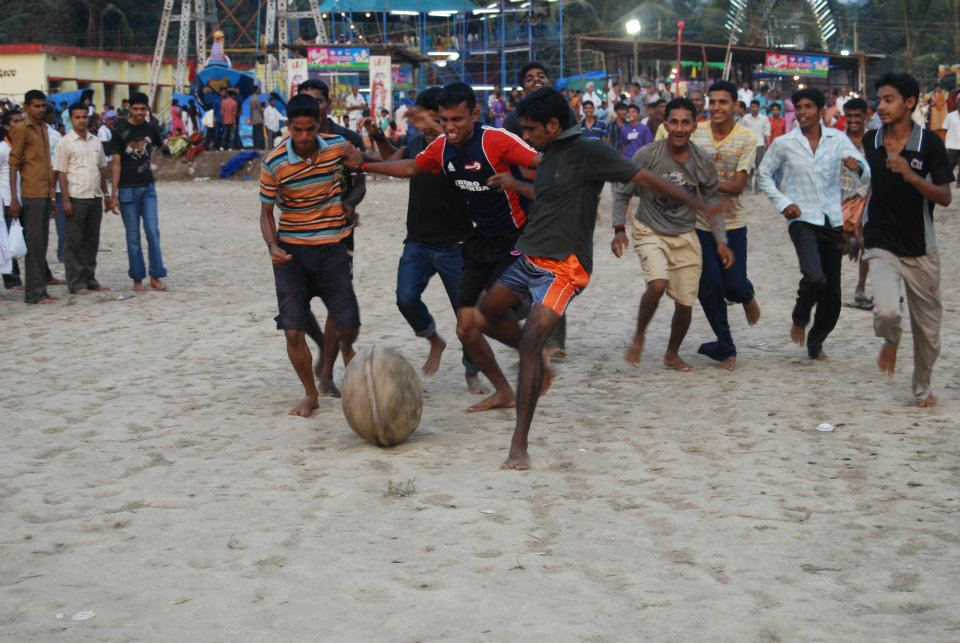
Chendu game

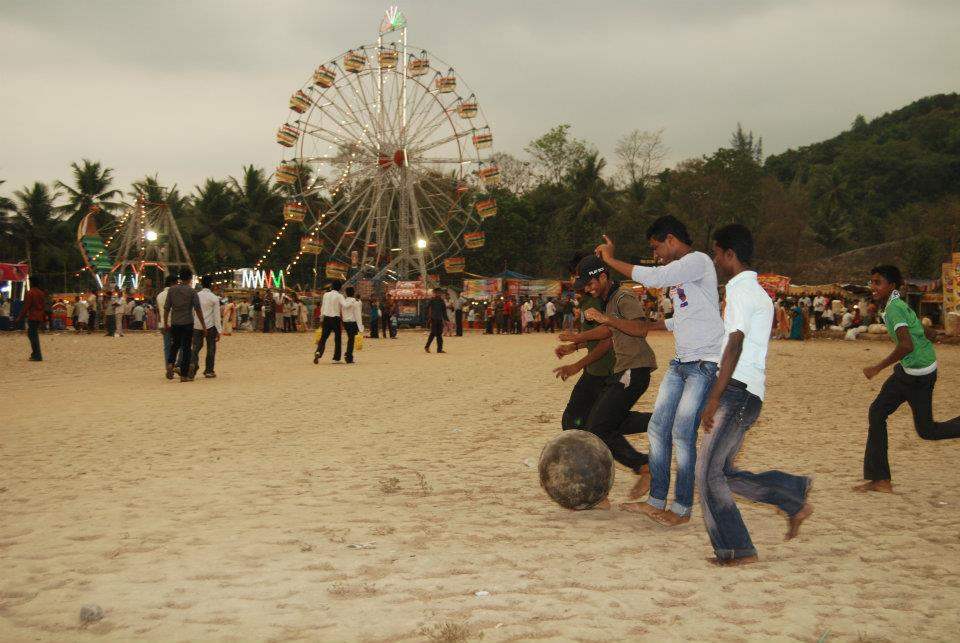
Football game during Chendu Festival

The Polali Chendu festival, also known as the football festival, is a popular football game. Up to five hundred people compete in the games, and any number of people may compete. The objective of the game is to get the ball to the opposition's side. The game historically represents the fight of good over evil and the car festival at the end of the games are said to represent the victory of the good over the evil.

== Annual festival ==
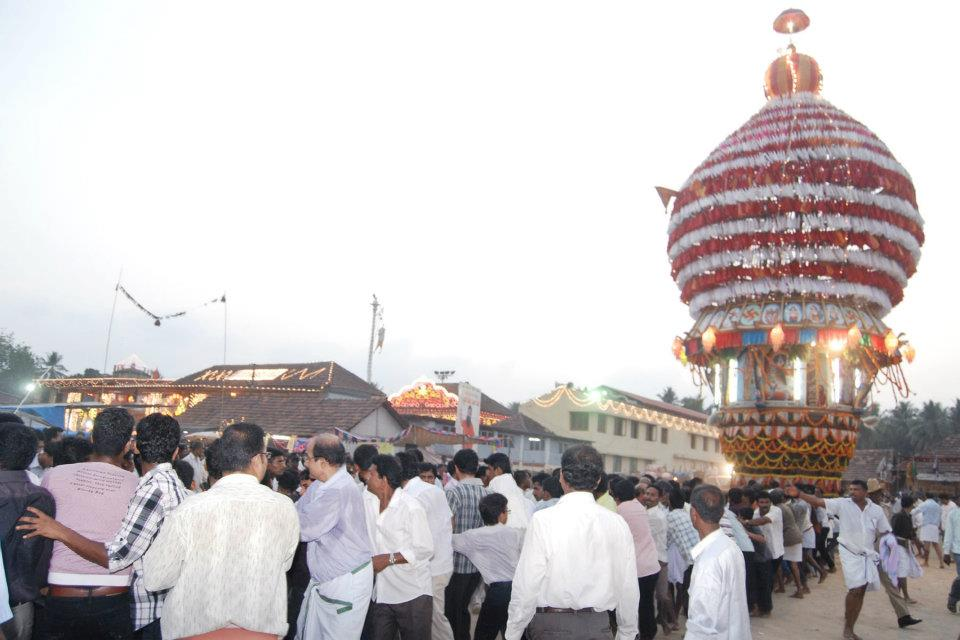
Temple car during festival

An annual festival is celebrated at the temple during the month of March. The festival lasts for one month. During the festival the idol of the temple deity is placed on a circular crown called Prabhavathi, which is beautifully decorated for the purpose. On the 4th day of the festival, the idol is placed on Simhasana Katte, a platform approximately 100 metres from the temple and a special pooja is performed.

== See also ==
- Madhur Temple
- Sri Gopalakrishna Temple Kumble
- List of Hindu temples in India
