= Polali =

- village
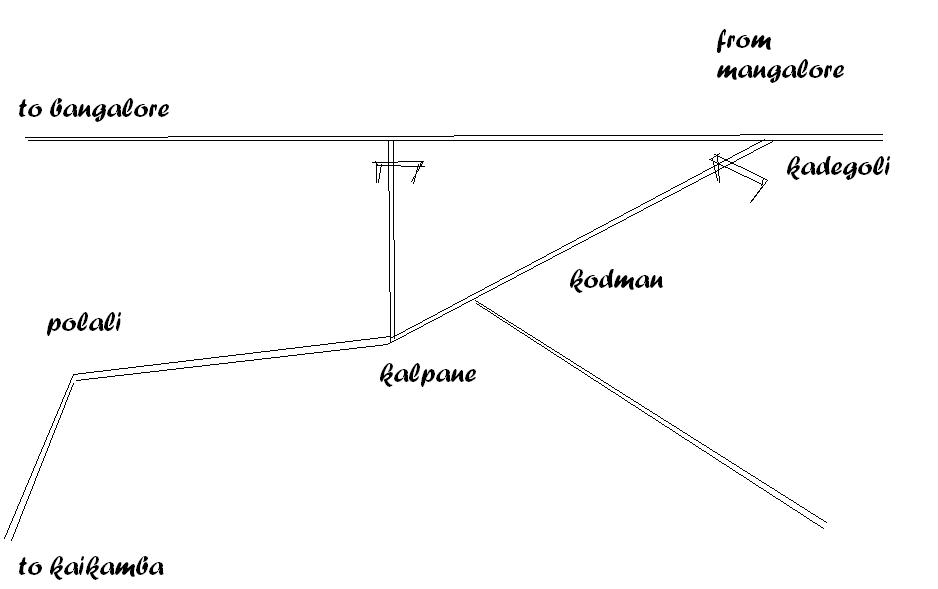
- Polali route map from Mangalore-Bangalore road
- Country: India
- State: Karnataka

Languages
  - Official: Kannada
- Time zone: UTC+5:30 (IST)

Polali is a village in Bantwal taluk, in the Dakshina Kannada (South Canara) district of Karnataka state in India. Polali is known for the Rajarajeshwari Temple. Raja Rajeshwari is an icon of Shakti. Polali Shri Raja Rajeshwari temple hosts a month-long annual jaatra held in the month of March and April. The temple is thronged by devotees during this time. A fair is also held in the premises of the temple.

== History ==
Shri Rajarajeshwari temple is located at Polali in Kariyangala Village of Bantwal Taluk in Dakshina Kannada District of Karnataka State. Shri Kshetra Polali is in the heart of this village surrounded by high hillocks and wide paddy fields. River Phalguni flows from east on the northern side a furlong way from the temple. It turns left towards south at the back of the temple in the Western side. This place was being called as Pural and the deity in the temple was known as Porala Devi in several old records and ancient epigraphs available.

Puliapura is its Sanskrit version. In Tulu this is called Pural. It is believed that King Suratha got the temple constructed, installed the image and placed his own crown on the head of the image. This is an ancient temple. This temple has been alluded to in the Ashokan inscriptions and in the reports of the foreign travelers who visited India. Queen Chennammaji of Keladi visited Polali and got a grand chariot constructed for the temple.

Being a pilgrimage Centre, Polali attracts travelers and tourists. Polali Chendu is a festival held in this temple, which is performed during annual festival of the temple on April.
