= Kumbla =

- Town
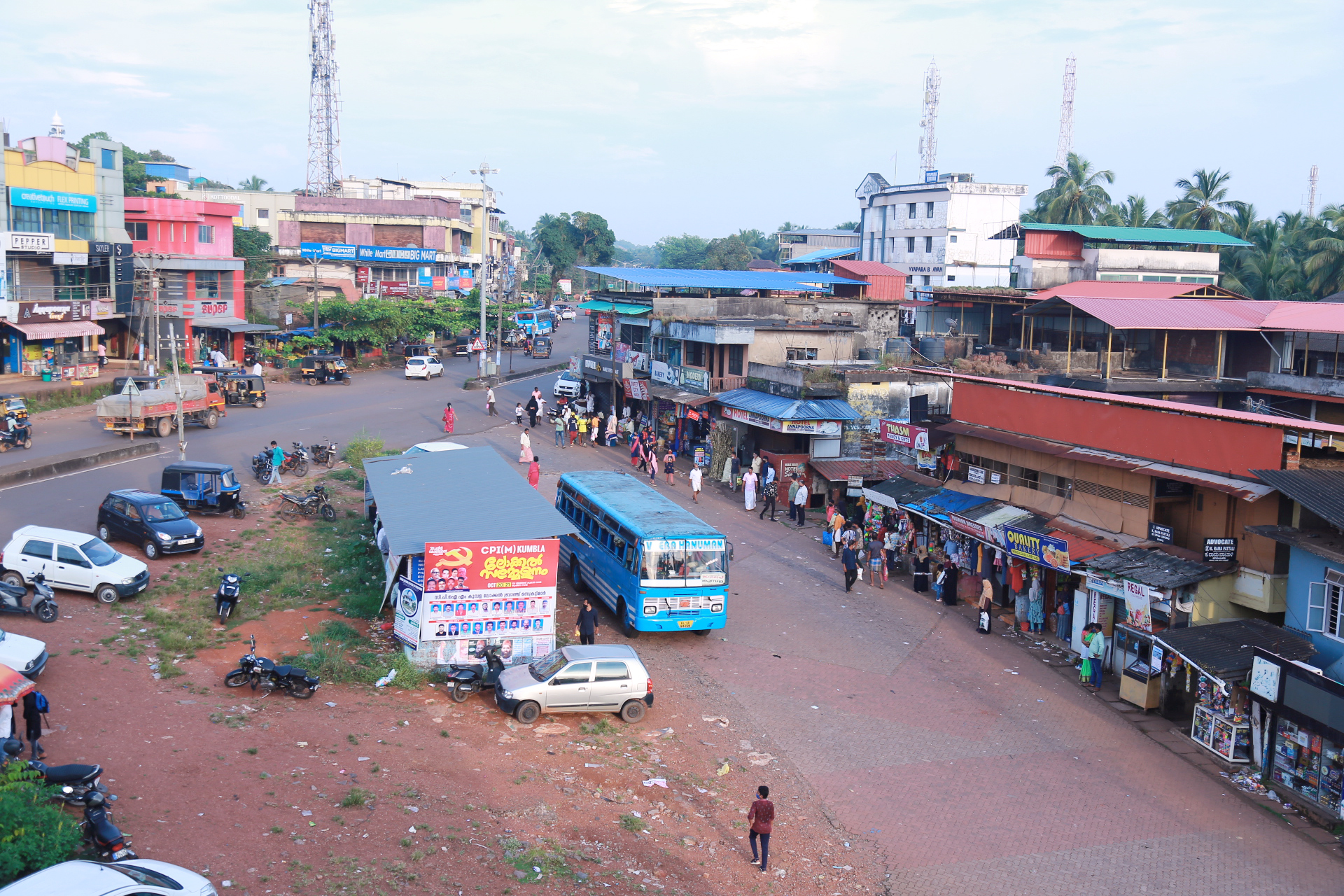
- Kumbla Town Bus stand

- Location in Kerala, India Kumbla (India)
- Coordinates: 12.5946°N 74.9472°E
- Country: India
- State: Kerala
- District: Kasaragod

Government
  - Type: Panchayati raj (India)
  - Body: Grama Panchayat

Area
  - Total: 40.18 km^{2} (15.51 sq mi)

Population (2011)
  - Total: 46,691
  - Density: 1,162/km^{2} (3,010/sq mi)

Languages
  - Official: Malayalam, English
- Time zone: UTC+5:30 (IST)
- PIN: 671321
- Telephone code: 4998
- Vehicle registration: KL-14
- Nearest city: Kasaragod
- Lok Sabha constituency: Kasaragod
- Civic agency: Panchayat

Kumbla is a small town in the Kasaragod district of Kerala state in India. It is located 12 km north of Kasaragod town.

== History ==
Kanvapura, the original name, was derived from the name of Maharshi Kanva. Since then the name has morphed into "Kanipura" via oral transmission. The historic and ancient temple of Gopalakrishna in Kumble was believed to have been conceived by Kanva Maharshi. Kumble was once the seat of the Kumbla Kings l, who ruled the southern part of Tuluva Kingdom. Ramacharitam, probably the oldest literary work written in Old Malayalam, which dates back to 12th century CE, is thought to have written somewhere near Kumbla as its manuscripts were discovered from Nileshwaram and the poem mentions about Ananthapura Lake Temple in Kumbla in detail. Kumbla was a small port in ancient times. The Kumbla dynasty, who swayed over the land of southern Tulu Nadu wedged between Chandragiri River and Netravati River (including present-day Taluks of Manjeshwar and Kasaragod) from Maipady Palace at Kumbla, had also been vassals to the Kolathunadu kingdom of North Malabar, before the Carnatic conquests of Vijayanagara Empire. The Kumbla dynasty had a mixed lineage of Malayali Nairs and Tuluva Brahmins. They also claimed their origin from kadambas of Karnataka. Francis Buchanan-Hamilton states that the customs of Kumbla dynasty were similar to those of the contemporary Malayali kings, though Kumbla was considered as the southernmost region of Tulu Nadu. Kannada kingdoms focused on Kasaragod in the 16th century CE. The Vijayanagara Empire attacked and annexed Kasaragod from the Kolathiri Raja with Nileshwaram as one of the capital in the 16th century. In the 16th century A.D. (1514), Duarte Barbosa, the Portuguese traveller, visited Kumble and he had recorded that he had found people exporting rice to the Maldives in exchange of coir According to Barbosa, the people in the southwestern Malabar coast of India from Kumbla in the north to Kanyakumari in the south had spoken a unique language, which they called as "Maliama" (Malayalam). If he is right, then the kingdom of Kumbla would be the northern end of Malayalam region in the first quarter of 16th century CE. When Tippu Sultan captured Mangaluru, the Kumble Raja fled to Thalassery; but he returned in 1799 and after an unsuccessful fight for independence, submitted to the British Empire and accepted a small pension of Rs. 11,788 per annum in 1804. Parthisubba, the great Yakshagana exponent, known as Father of Yakshagana was born here in the 18th century.

== Demographics ==
As of 2011 Census, Kumbla Grama Panchayat had total population of 46,691 among which 27,033 lives in Urban areas with 5,168 households and 19,658 people in rural areas with 3,506 households. Males constitute 22,629 (48.5%) and Females constitute 24,062 (51.5%) in Kumbla Panchayat. Population of children in the age group 0-6 is 6,031 (12.9%) in the panchayat limits. Among this, male child constitutes 3,093 (51.3%) and female child constitutes 2,938 (48.7%).

Total number of literates in Kumbla Panchayat is 36,319 which makes overall literacy rate of 89.3%. Total male literates are 18,293 (93.6%) and female literates are 18,026 (85.3%).

Kumbla Panchayat has 2 census towns and 3 revenue villages under its jurisdiction. Koipady and Mogral are the census towns and Arikady, Bombrana and Kidoor are the revenue villages.

== Tourist attractions ==
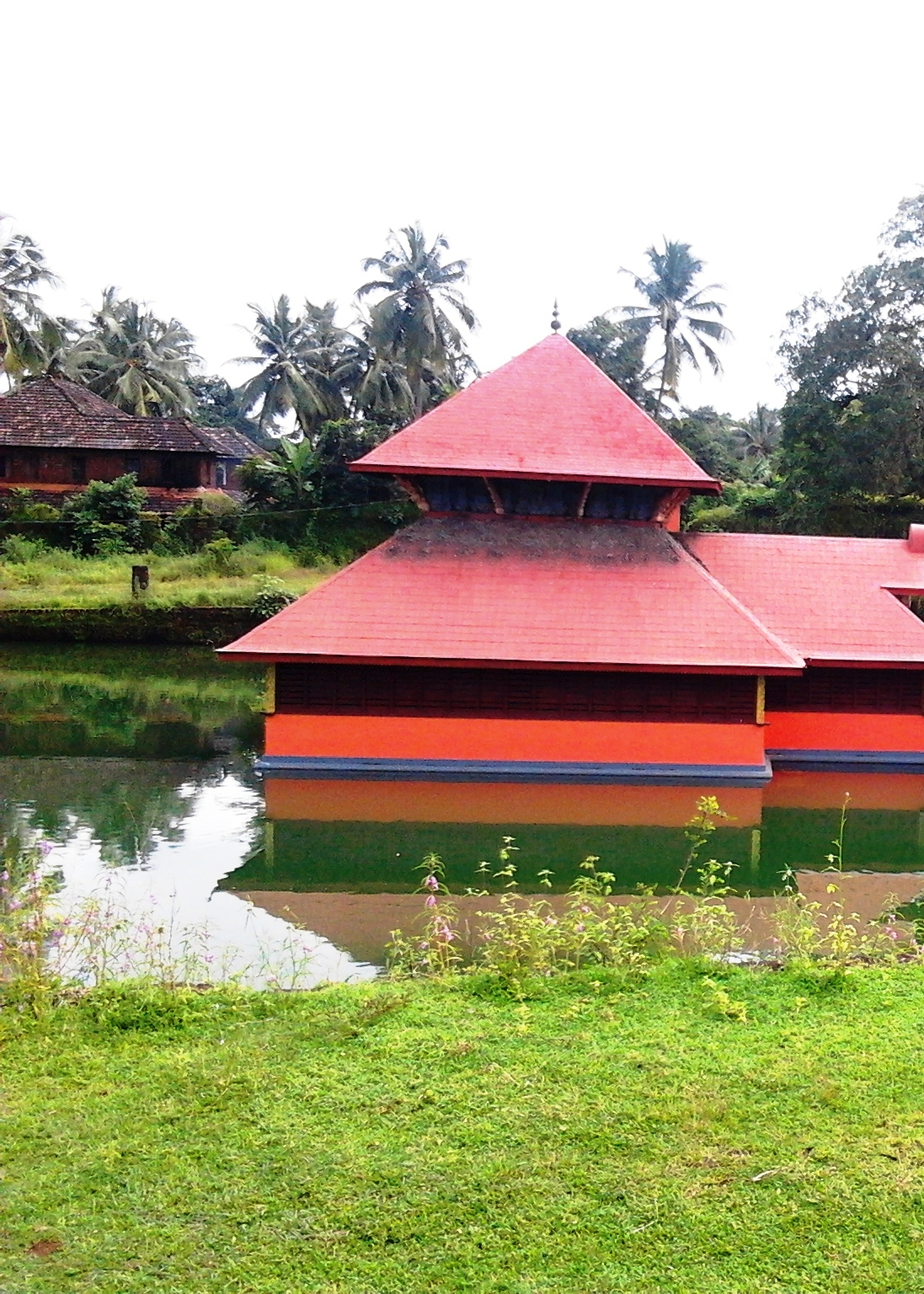

- Ananthapura Lake Temple

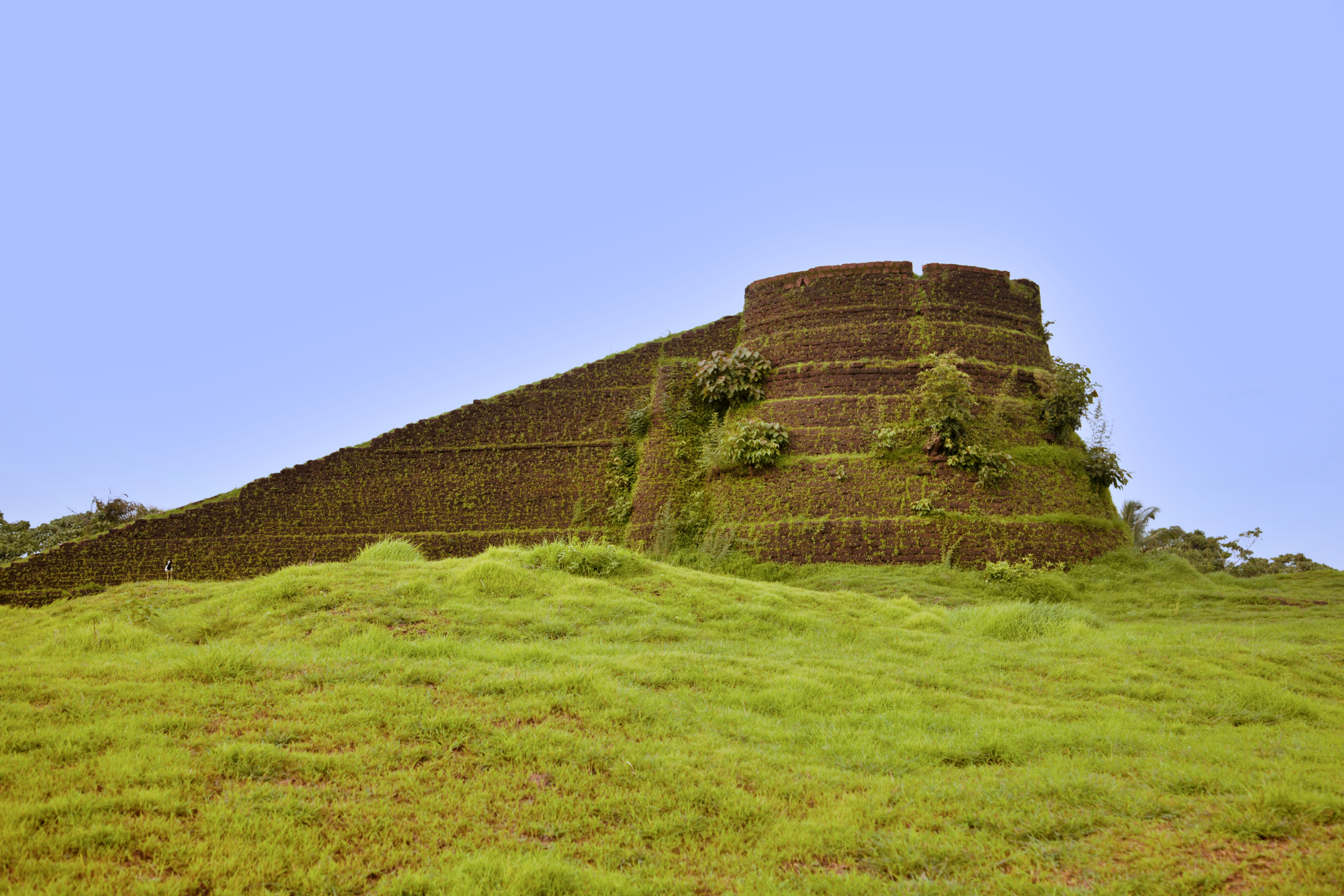

- Arikady fort
- Shree Gopalakrishna temple
- Kumbla River Mangroves

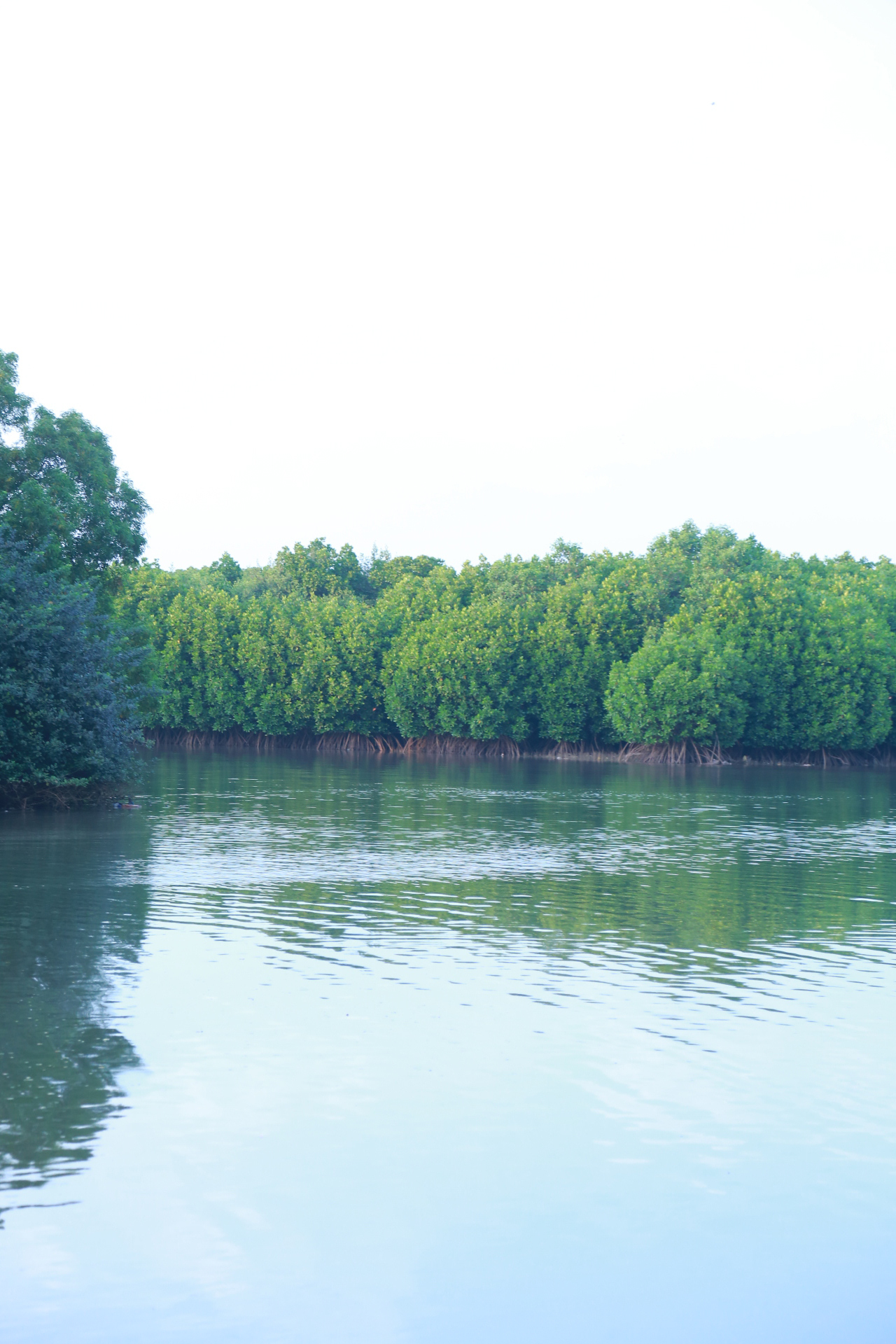

== Notable people ==
- Anil Kumble, former captain and the former coach of Indian national cricket team takes his last name, indicating ancestry or family origins, from this town. Recently one of the main roads to Government Hospital was renamed as Anil Kumble Road in a function conducted by Kumble Panchayat.
- Jagdish Kumble is an Indian professional kabaddi player and coach. He coaches the Telugu Titans in the Pro Kabaddi League. He was member of the India national kabaddi team that won Asian games gold medals in 2002 which was held at Busan. Jagdish Kumble runs a kabaddi academy in Kasargod, Kerala.

== See also ==
- Uppala
- Perla
- Vidyanagar
- Kanipura Sri Gopalakrishna Temple
- Betel Nut
- Bekal Fort
