= Kanipura Sri Gopalakrishna Temple =

Hindu temple in Kerala, India

- Location in Kerala

Religion
- Affiliation: Hinduism
- District: Kasaragod district
- Deity: Shri Gopalakrishna
- Festivals: Annual Festival, Kumble Bedi

Location
- Location: Kumbla
- State: Kerala
- Country: India
- Coordinates: 12.5949093°N 74.9424009°E

Architecture
- Type: Hindu architecture
- Temple: 1

Kanipura Sri Gopalakrishna Temple at Kumbla is an ancient temple situated eight miles due north of the town of Kasaragod in Kerala in South India. This shrine is eulogised as among the extant Abhimana Kshethrams in Vaishnavite tradition. The Krishnashila Idol of the Lord Bala Gopalkrishna had the features of a child and was worshipped by Lord Krishna's foster mother Yashoda. According to local religious beliefs, this idol was presented by the almighty Lord Krishna himself to the sage Maharshi in Dvapara Yuga, who in turn the idol at its present location where the temple still stands today. Historical records state that in the 10th-century, the Temple was renovated by King Jayasimha of the Kadamba dynasty, whose capital was Kumbla and even the administration of his Kingdom was being done in the name of Kanipura Sri Gopalkrishna. The coronation of Kumbla Rajas was being solemnized at Kanipura Sri Gopalkrishna Temple. It is stated that Sri Gopalkrishna Temple has the sanctity of over three Yugas of Treta Yuga, Dvapara Yuga and Kali Yuga. Priests of this temple belong to the Kota Brahmin community.

== History ==
Kanipura Temple was the original seat of the Raja of Kumbla, which was later on shifted to Maipady (Mayapuri). Even to this day, one can see the ruins of the fort at Kumbla (or Kotekar) and Arikadi, which bear testimony to the political importance of Kumbla in the days gone by. Kanipura is only a derivative of Kanvapura. Tradition ascribes the Prathishtah of Sri Gopalkrishna Moorthi of the temple to Kanva Maharshi from whom the name of the place is derived. The other place names such as Kannur (also called Kanva Peetah) within two miles to the east of the temple and the well known Kanva Teertha of the Pejavar Mutt fame near Manjeshwar, also are indicative of the faith of the people in the many legends relating to the association of the sage Kanva with this temple and the surrounding place.

The Sthala-Purana legend claims that after installing the idol, a jet-black granite statue of Balagopalakrishna that was being worshipped by Yashoda, the sage performed Adhishekam to the deity using the Manthrodaka that he had previously saved in his Kamandalu. The Manthrodaka then flowed out as a stream, grew into a river, and eventually joined the western sea not far from the temple. The river is "Kumbha Hole" (Hole means river) which thus is also known as the Kumbhini. The town as well came to be known as Kumbla from this.

The temple, for which extensive repairs and renovations have been carried out, is situated in the heart of the town of Kumbla at the foot of an elevated hill which rises in front of it, with the river Kumbha Hole flanking it on the north. If Srimadanantheshwara, and Sri Vinayaka of Madhur are the deities of the daily worship of the senior Raja of Kumbla, the patta Abhisheka or coronation of the senior Raja in ancient days would have taken place at Kanipura Sri Gopalakrishna temple. The Abhisheka of the Yuvaraja of Kumbla used to take place at Srimath Udaneshwara Temple of Perdala, which in Kumbla Seema is only next in importance to the above four temples.

Kanipura Sri Gopalakrishna's praises have been sung by Parthi Subba, the "father of Yakshagana", along with those of Madhur Sri Mahaganapathi, in several songs. It was in Kumbla that Parthi Subba was born and grew up (in about 1740 to 1800 A.D) and composed all his Yakshagana Prasangas, which earned for him the title of the father of "Thenkku Thittu Yakshagana". He was in the line of the Paatalies of the Kumbla temple, and at the Moodappa seva in Madhur temple in 1797 had presented a copper "Dhara Battal" to that temple inscribed with his name in Kannada, which is presently in use at the Madhur temple.

== Festivals ==
The festival at the Kumbla temple which lasts five days every year commences with Dhwaja Arohanam on the Makara Sankramana day every year. The festival comes to an end with the idol coming back after being dipped in the pond about three kilometres from the temple premises and the holy flag (Kodi) coming down. Popularly known as "Kumble Bedi", because of the display of crackers done in front of the idol. The idol is sat on the Banyan tree platform and the display extends to almost one and half hours. People from different parts of Kerala and Tulunadu assemble for the festival. "Bali" is the typical way of carrying the idol overhead of a poojary who goes around the temple with the idol decorated with flower and ornaments, which is never to be too light. The poojary moves as per the taala of chendamelam and vadyam. First he moves with one of his hands supporting the idol on his head and the other hand swinging. In the end, he removes the support and moves quickly around the temple.

== In the media ==
The temple was in the news in 2012 when the temple was facing a threat of extinction. Situated at a narrow place in between the Arabian Sea and the temple, the National Highway Authorities decided to demolish the temple. Protesting the NHAI's move, on 24 January 2012 pro-Hindu organisations demonstrated a massive rally in the city of Kasaragod. There was a march that was organised which began from Kumble ended at Kasaragod, over 100,000 people from Kasaragod participated in this protest. Sri Pejawar Vishweshwara Swamiji of Udupi, Sri Delampady Balakrishna Tantri of Agalpady, several other socio-religious leaders, Subbayya Shetty, Convenor of Temple conservation committee, IUML MLA's N.A.Nellikkunnu and PB Abdul Razak, BJP leaders Surendran, Ramesh and others headed the protest rally.

== See also ==
- Ananthapura Lake Temple
- Madhur Temple
