= Vidyanagar, Kasaragod =

Vidyanagar
- Town
- Location within Kerala
- Coordinates: 12°31′02.8″N 75°00′44.9″E
- Country: India
- State: Kerala
- District: Kasaragod district

Languages
  - Official: Malayalam, English, Kannada, Tulu
- Time zone: UTC+5:30 (IST)
- PIN: 671123 (Vidyanagar Post Office)
- Telephone code: 04994
- Vehicle registration: KL-14(Kasaragod)
- Nearest city: Kasaragod
- Lok Sabha constituency: Kasaragod (Lok Sabha constituency)
- Climate: Tropical monsoon (Köppen)
- Avg. summer temperature: 35 °C (95 °F)
- Avg. winter temperature: 19 °C (66 °F)

Vidyanagar is a locality in Kasaragod municipality. It is located 5.6 km from Kasaragod Town at the National Highway 66 towards Kannur.

Formerly known as Kunhimavindadi, it was officially renamed as Vidyanagar (place of Great Knowledge) after the opening of Government College, Kasaragod here in 1957. The place has a large population of Muslims, Hindus and Christians .

Vidyanagar is known as the Educational hub of Kasaragod District as it also houses Kannur University B.Ed. center (Located in Chala, Vidyanagar), Govt ITI (Industrial training institute), Kendriya Vidyalaya, TIHSS Naimarmoola, KS Abdullah School, Chinmaya Vidyalaya, PTMAUPS Bedira - Chala etc..

The Kasaragod district Collectorate is also in Vidyanagar.

== Transport ==
=== Road ===
The National Highway 66(formerly NH17) enters Kerala in Kunjathur of Kasargod district, through which major towns in the district are connected to Mangalore. The highway form a backbone of the road network for the district from Talapady, covering major towns like Uppala, Kasaragod, Cherkala, Kanhangad, Nileshwaram and Cheruvathur. The NH exits the district in Kalikadavu (Pilicode) which ends at Edappally.

=== Air ===
The nearest airport to Vidyanagar is Mangalore International Airport, which is around 60 km away from the town. Kannur International Airport, which is 116 km, Other airports near Vidyanagar is Calicut International Airport, lies about 223 km to the south and Mysore Airport, which is around 259 km to the south east.

== Languages ==
Kasargod district is one of the rare districts in India which houses as many as 7 different languages (excluding dialects and tribal languages), with each spoken by a substantial number of people.

== Climate ==
Vidyanagar experiences a Tropical monsoon climate under the Köppen climate classification.

Climate data for Kasaragod, Kerala
Month	Jan	Feb	Mar	Apr	May	Jun	Jul	Aug	Sep	Oct	Nov	Dec	Year
Mean daily maximum °C (°F)	31.4 (88.5)	31.5 (88.7)	32.2 (90.0)	32.7 (90.9)	32.2 (90.0)	29.3 (84.7)	28.2 (82.8)	28.4 (83.1)	28.8 (83.8)	30.0 (86.0)	31.0 (87.8)	31.5 (88.7)	30.6 (87.1)
Mean daily minimum °C (°F)	21.7 (71.1)	22.8 (73.0)	24.3 (75.7)	25.9 (78.6)	25.7 (78.3)	23.9 (75.0)	23.4 (74.1)	23.6 (74.5)	23.5 (74.3)	23.8 (74.8)	23.1 (73.6)	22.0 (71.6)	23.6 (74.6)
Average precipitation mm (inches)	1 (0.0)	1 (0.0)	5 (0.2)	55 (2.2)	262 (10.3)	1,002 (39.4)	1,190 (46.9)	647 (25.5)	338 (13.3)	229 (9.0)	77 (3.0)	18 (0.7)	3,825 (150.5)
Source: Climate-Data.org

== Administration ==
=== Parliament Constituency ===
- Kasaragod

=== Assembly Constituencies ===
1. Kasaragod

== Sports ==
In Vidyanagar, cricket and football are highly prioritized. Along with these, other sports like volleyball and badminton also hold importance.

The region is home to several major stadiums, including the Kasaragod Municipal Stadium & Kasaragod municipality volleyball stadium located at Chala, Vidyanagar.

The Friends Chala Arts and Sports Club and the Chandragiri Arts and Sports Club, being the oldest cricket and football clubs in the district, hold a significant position in the community.
