= Neeliyar Bhagavathi =

Hindu deity

Neeliyar Bhagavathi

Neeliyar Bhagavathi is a Theyyam & a ritual deity, worshipped as a mother goddess in Northern Kerala in India.

== Gallery ==
The spot where Theyyam is performed

The performance

Face-painting

Face-painting

Walking from the preparation room to the performance ground

Final touches

Before the hair is worn

To the stage

On the stage

Neeliyar Bhagavathi face-painting

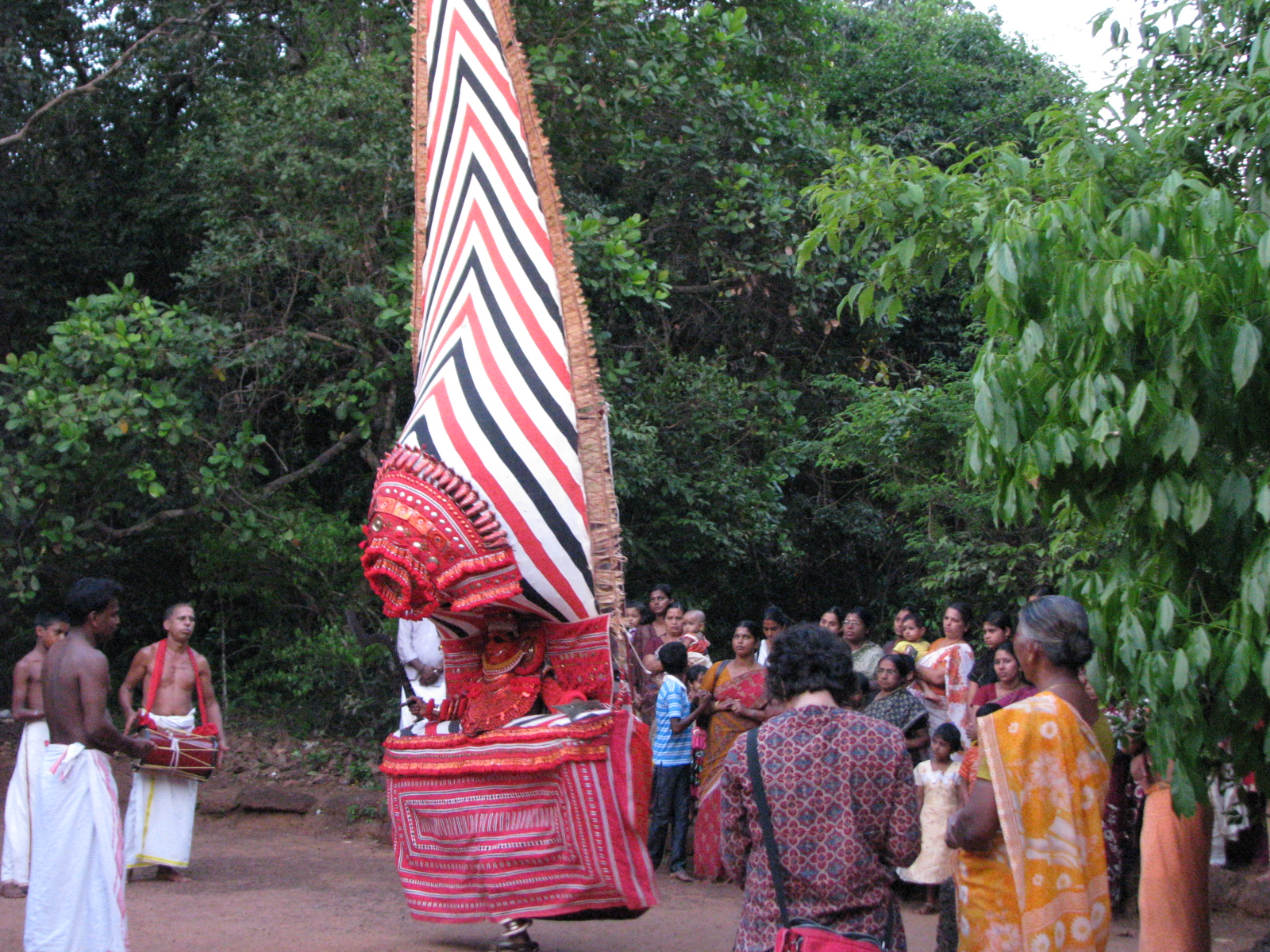
Neeliyar Bhagavathi

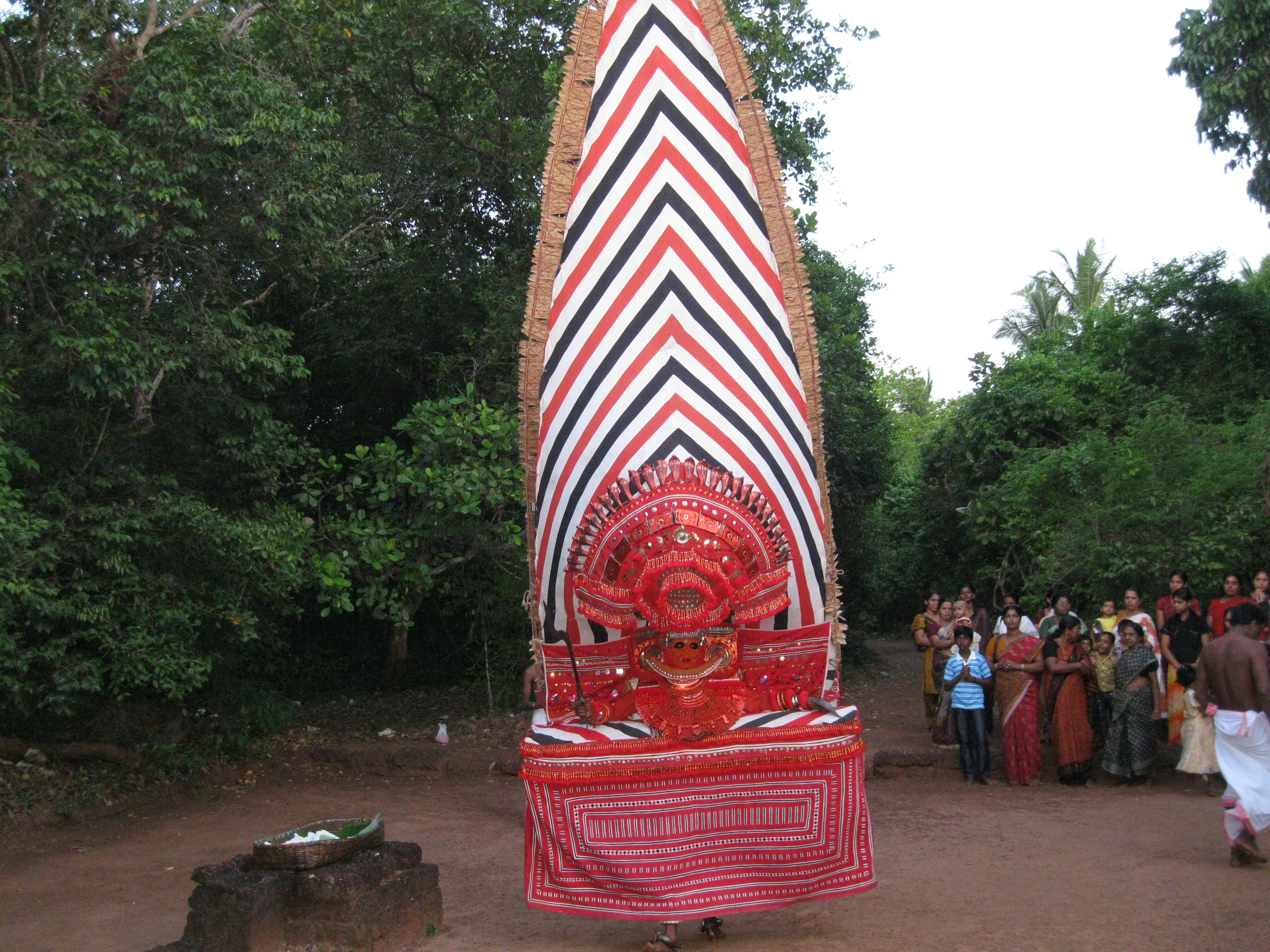
Neeliyar Bhagavathi
