= Bappiriyan Theyyam =

Regional Hindu god

Bappiriyan
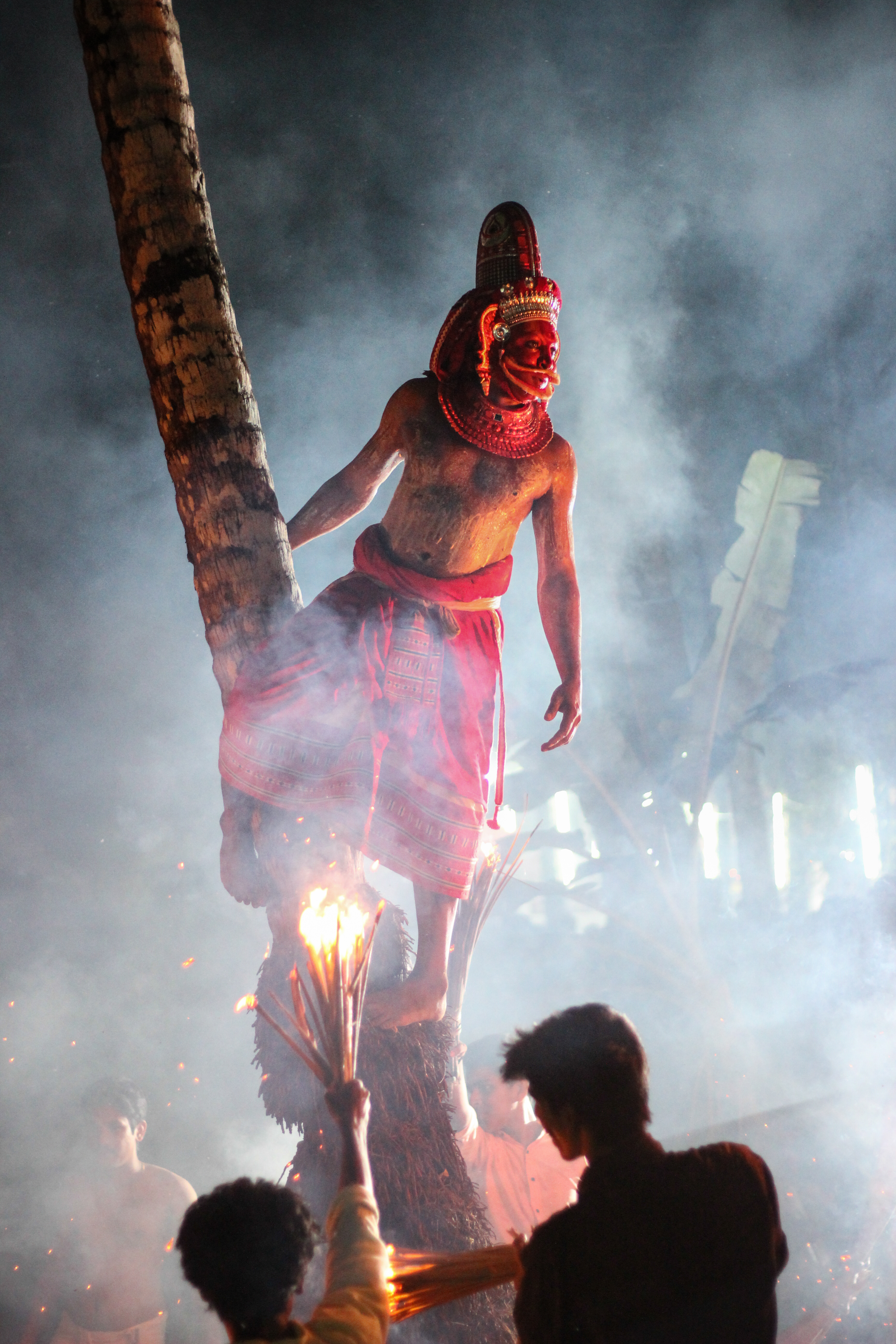
- Bappiriyan Theyyam at Muchiriyan Kavu Kannur
- Affiliation: Hinduism
- Region: North Malabar, Kerala, India

Bappiriyan Theyyam (also spelled as Bappirian) is a theyyam performed in North Malabar region in Kerala, India. It is a type of Mappila Theyyam.

The myth of Bappiriyan who is believed to be a Muslim and Arya Poonkani, a Hindu goddess is an example of Hindu-Islamic religious harmony in Kerala.

== Myth ==
=== Myth related to Arya Poonkani ===
Bappiriyan was believed to be a Muslim merchant who made a name for himself in Tulu Nadu. In the mythology, he was the captain of the ship in which the goddess Arya Poonkani was sailing.

According to the myths, Arya Poonkani and her brothers, who were travelling in search of pearls for the marriage, got caught in a storm and were separated by a shipwreck. They took hold of the wreckage of the wrecked ship and spent seven days at sea, and on the eighth day they all came ashore. When they reached the shore, they separated from each other.

Arya Poonkani, worried by the sea, sees Bappiriyan going in a small boat in the sea. At first he ignores Aryapoonganni's call for help, but she surprises him with her magical skills and takes Bappiriyan with her to rush his brothers. Finally they find her brothers in Venmalatinkara, but they were not ready to go with her and decided to settle there. Then Aryapoonkanni and Bappiriyan continues the journey and reaches the Kooran hills on the North Malabar coast. There they are enshrined in the Thaliparamba Kaithakeel temple.

=== Myth related to Ramayana ===
Another myth is related to Ramayana. According to this, Hanuman who goes in search of Sita is portrayed as Bappiriyan Theyyam. Unable to find Sita, Bappiriyan would climb into big trees and send his eyes to distant places. This is why theyyam climbs the coconut trees. In his anger at not finding Sita, Bappiriyan kicks the coconut tree and drops down all the coconuts in the tree.

== Ritual ==
An important ritual in theyyam performance is that Bappiriyan Theyyam climbs the coconut trees and shakes the tree by kicking them and dropping all the coconuts. During this ceremony, it is common for the performers to fall from the coconut tree and get seriously injured.

This theyyam is performed by the Vannan community in Kerala. The story of Bappiriyan theyyam is an example of Hindu-Islamic religious harmony in Kerala.
