= Madhur Temple =

Hindu temple in Kerala, India

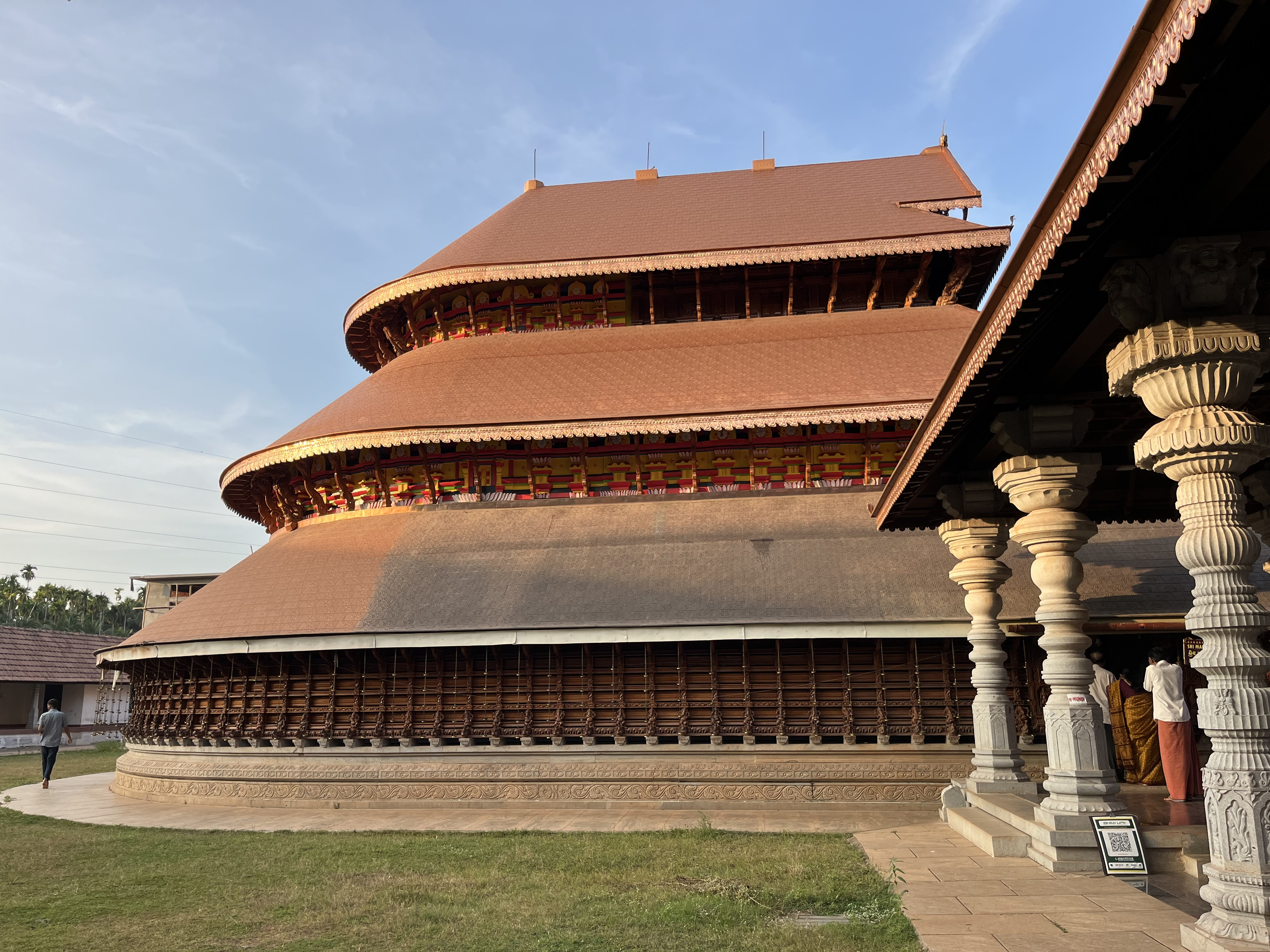
- Madhur Temple

- Location within Kerala Location within India

Religion
- Affiliation: Hinduism
- Region: Kasaragod, Tulunad
- Deity: Shiva and Ganapathi

Location
- Coordinates: 12.5534891°N 75.0101819°E

Architecture
- Type: temple

Madhur Shree Madanantheshwara-Siddhivinayaka Temple is a popular Shiva and Ganapathi temple located 7 km (4.3 mi) from Kasaragod town, on the banks of Mogral river, locally known as Madhuvahini. Though the main deity of this temple is Lord Shiva known as Madanantheshwara, meaning the god who killed Kama, the god of desires, more importance is given to Lord Ganapathi, who is installed facing south in the main sanctum itself. Priests of this temple belong to the Shivalli Brahmin community. Kashi Vishwanatha, Dharmasastha, Subrahmanya, Durga Parameshwari, Veerabhadra and Gulika are the sub-deities of this temple. There is also presence of Goddess Parvati inside the main sanctum.

== History ==
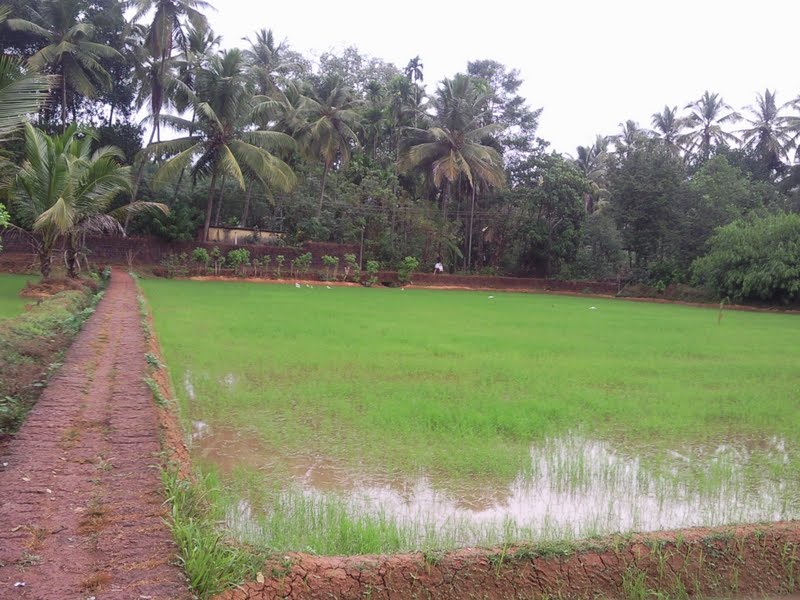
Vicinity of Madhur

Madhur temple was originally Shree Madaneshwara (Shiva) Temple and as the lore goes, an old woman called Madaru from the local Tulu Moger Community discovered an "Udbhava Murthy" (a statue that was not made by a human) of shiva linga. Initially, the Ganapathy picture was drawn by a boy, on the southern wall of the Garbhagriha(sanctum sanctorum) while playing. Day by day it became big and fat; so that the boy called Ganapathi as "boddajja" or "Bodda Ganesha". The temple was under the Kumbla Rajas, Maipady Palace. Later, Devaswom board took over it. The legend of Kumble seme says Tipu Sultan wanted to demolish the temple like Adooru Mahalingeswara temple during his invasion of Coorg, Tulunadu, and Kerala. But after drinking water from the well of the temple, he changed his mind on attacking and demolishing the Garbhagudi and marched past Madhur. But to satisfy his soldiers and Islamic scholars he made a cut with his sword symbolizing the attack. The mark is still visible on the building that is built around the temple well.

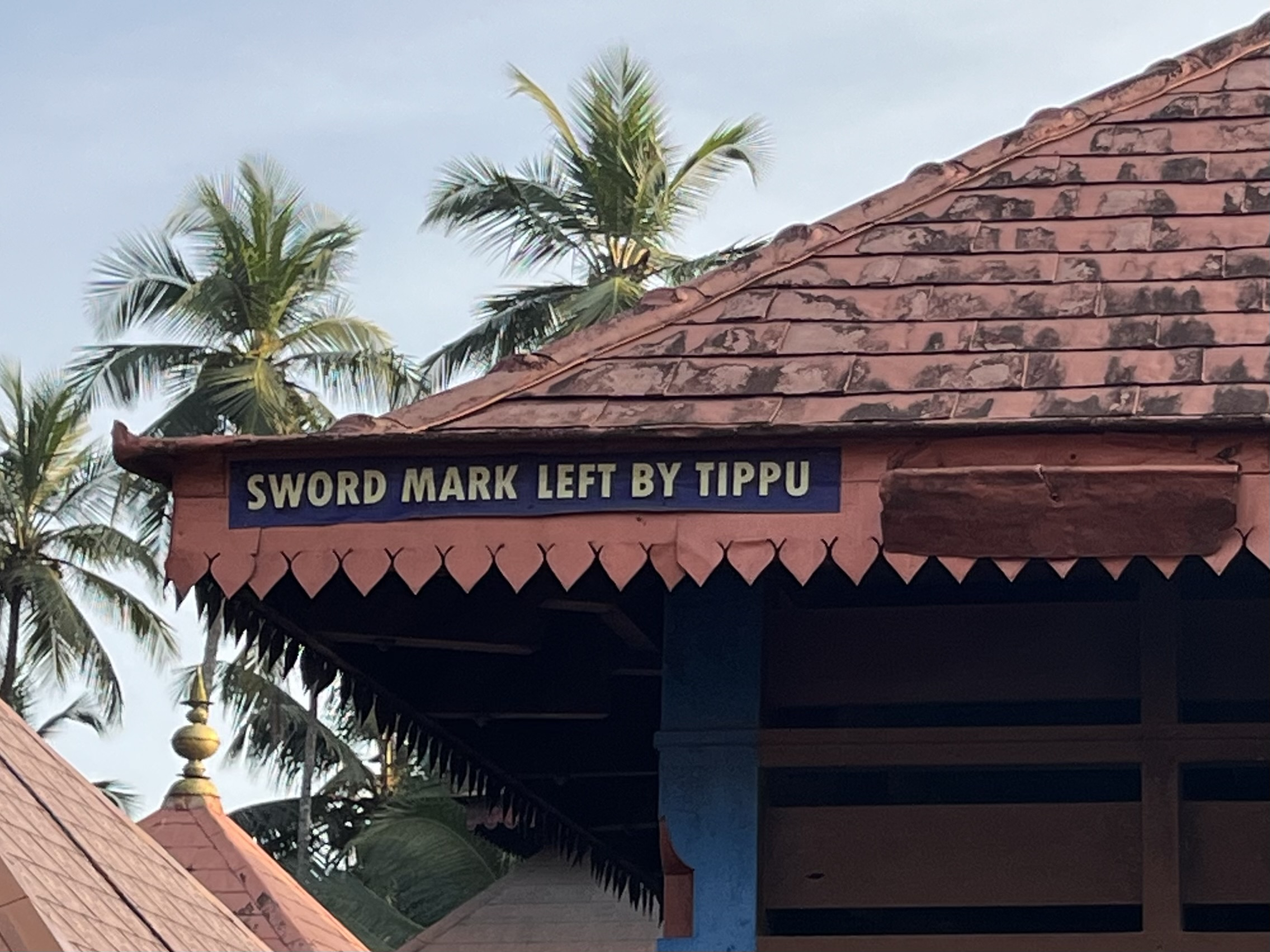
Sword mark left by Tipu Sultan at Madhur temple

== Overview ==
This is one of the six Ganapathi temples of ancient Tulunadu. The other five are Sharavu Mahaganapathy in Mangalore, Mahaganapathy in Anegudde (Kumbashi), Siddi Vinayaka in Hattiangadi (Kundapura), Dwibhuja Ganapathy in Idagunji, and Ganapati at Gokarna.

Devotees from all over throng during the various festivals that happen here. Currently, the temple is managed by the government. The temple also offers Veda classes to young vatus during summer vacation which also includes the basics of Sanskrit. The accommodation and food for the vatus are arranged by the temple authorities.

== Architecture ==
The temple architecture is of the 3-tiered gajaprishta type, resembling the back of an elephant. The lower layer walls feature intricate wooden carvings of Ganesha in different poses. The walls also feature detailed wooden carvings depicting scenes from the Ramayana. The gopurams provide a setting for the devotees to relax and experience the presence of Ganapathi.

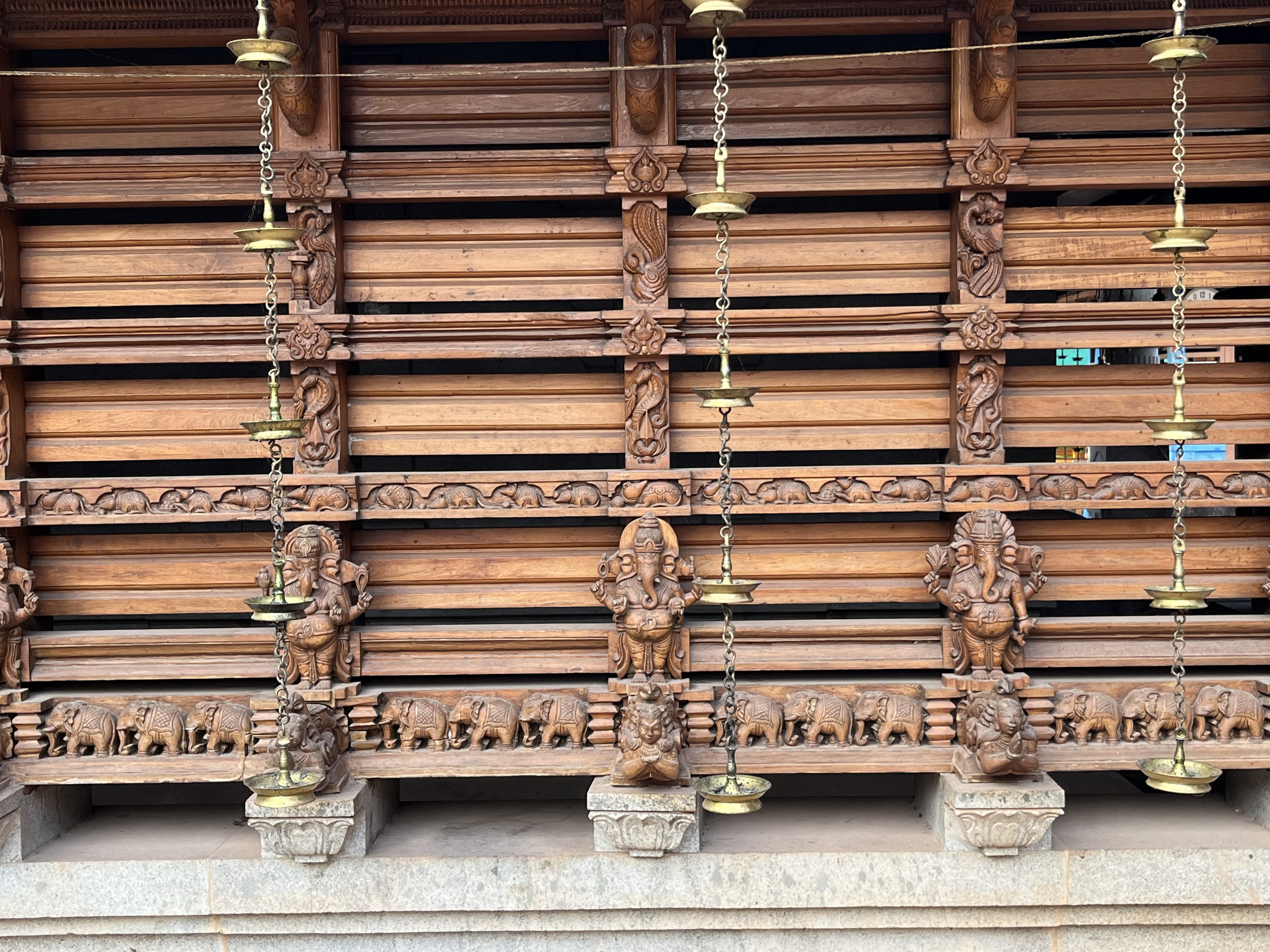
Intricate wood carvings at Madhur temple featuring Ganapathi in different poses

== Prayers and offerings made ==
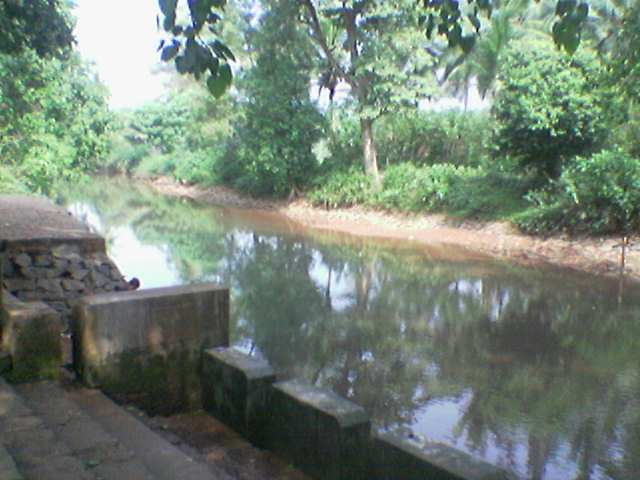
Madhuvahini stream near Madhur Temple

Devotees usually offer prayers to Mahaganapathi in the form of "Udayastamana". A prasada known as "Appa" is prepared daily at the site, and offered to worshippers. Among the poojas that are performed, "Sahasrappa" (Thousand appas) is very prominent. It consists of making an offering of thousand appas and then the devotees get to take home all these (and eat them with full relish). Another very special pooja that happens is Moodappam Seva which involves covering the Mahaganapathi statue with Appam. This is usually done on a community scale. Ganesh Chaturthi and Madhur Bedi are the occasions when the temple is at its busiest. The temple usually carries out special poojas on all the major festivals.

== See also ==
- Kanipura Sri Gopalakrishna Temple
- Ananthapura Lake Temple
- Temples of Kerala
