= Arikady =

- village
- Location in Kerala, India Arikady (India)
- Coordinates: 12.618380°N 74.945290°E
- Country: India
- State: Kerala
- District: Kasaragod

Government
  - Type: Panchayati raj (India)
  - Body: Kumbla Grama Panchayat

Population (2011)
  - Total: 6,941

Languages
  - Official: Malayalam, English
- Time zone: UTC+5:30 (IST)
- Telephone code: 4998
- Vehicle registration: KL-14
- Nearest city: Mangalore (40km), Kasaragod (12km)
- Lok Sabha constituency: Kasaragod
- Vidhan Sabha constituency: Manjeshwar

Arikady is a village in Manjeshwaram taluk of Kasaragod district in the state of Kerala, India.

== Demographics ==
As of 2011 India census, Arikady village had population of 6,941 with 3,325 males (47.9%) and 3,616 females (52.1%). Population of children in the age group of 0-6 was 1,019 (14.7%) among which 538 are boys and 481 are girls. Arikady village had overall literacy rate of 89.3% which constitutes male literacy of 94.3% and female literacy of 84.9%.
