= Ananthapura Lake Temple =

Hindu temple in Kerala, India

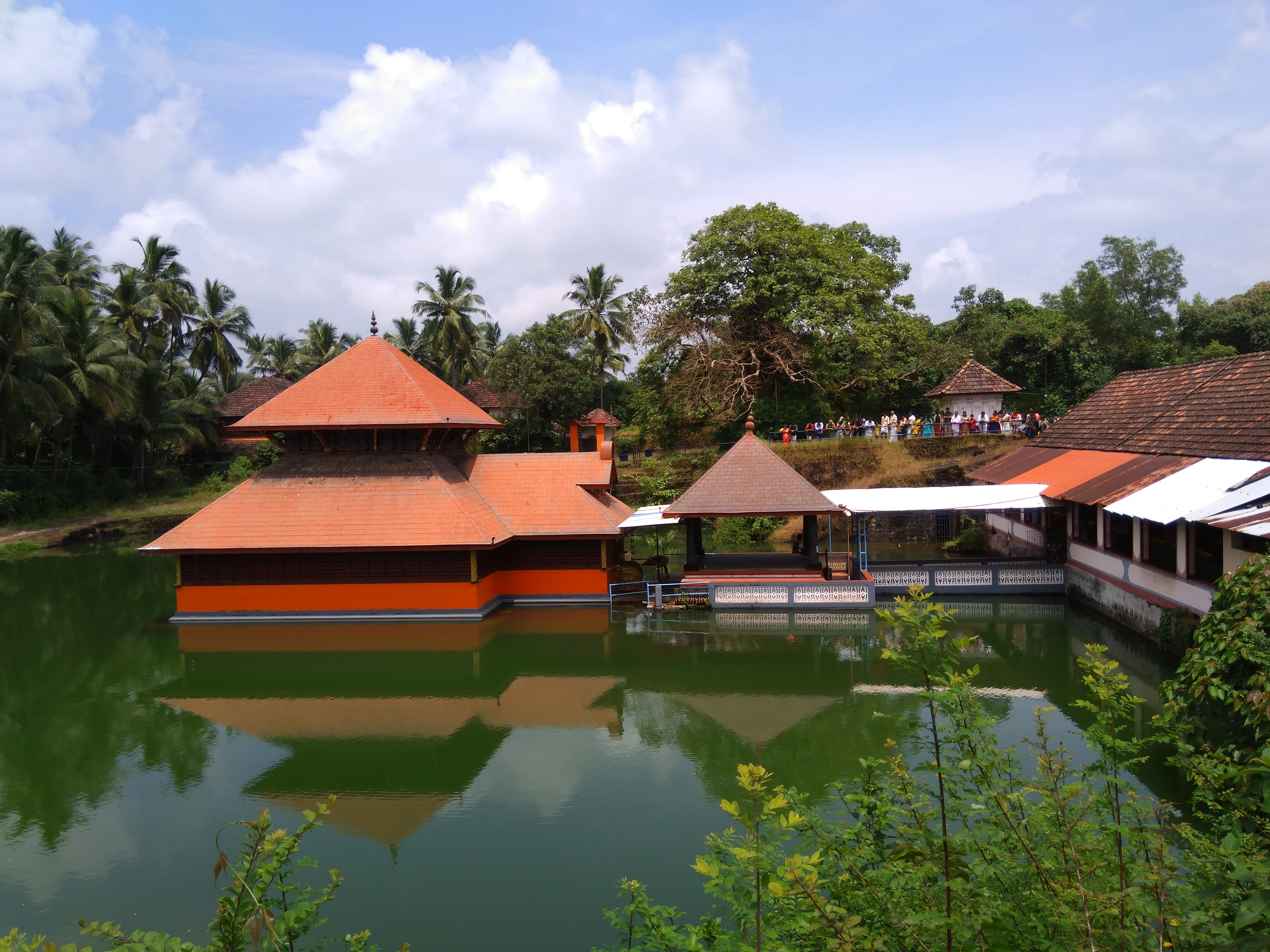
- Lake Temple

- Location in Kerala

Religion
- Affiliation: Hinduism
- District: Kasaragod district
- Deity: Anantha Padmanabhaswamy

Location
- Location: Naikap, Kumbla
- State: Kerala
- Country: India
- Coordinates: 12.5842449°N 74.979776°E

Architecture
- Type: Hindu architecture
- Temple: 1

Website
- ananthapuratemple.com

Ananthapadmanabha Swamy Temple, also known as the Ananthapura Lake Temple, is a Hindu temple dedicated to Anantha Padmanabhaswamy. It is in Ananthapura village of Manjeshwaram taluk, Kasaragod district, in the state of Kerala, India. The temple is located at the center of a rectangular tank—often referred to as a "lake"—and is the only temple of this kind in Kerala. According to tradition, it is believed to be the original seat (moolasthanam) of Padmanabhaswamy Temple in Thiruvananthapuram. It is considered one among the 108 Abhimana Kshethram of Vaishnavate tradition. Legend has it that this is the original site where Ananthapadmanabha settled down.

== See also ==
- Padmanabhaswamy Temple
- List of Hindu temples in Kerala
