= Padne =

Village in Kasargod district, Kerala, India

Padanna Padne
- Town
- Location in Kerala, India Padanna (India)
- Coordinates: 12°10′0″N 75°8′0″E
- Country: India
- State: Kerala
- District: Kasargod
- Taluk: Hosdurg

Government
  - Type: Panchayati Raj (India)
  - Body: Padanna Grama Panchayat

Area
  - Total: 13.06 km^{2} (5.04 sq mi)

Population (2011)
  - Total: 21,009
  - Density: 1,609/km^{2} (4,166/sq mi)

Languages
  - Official: Malayalam, English
- Time zone: UTC+5:30 (IST)
- PIN: 671312
- Vehicle registration: KL-60

Padne is a village in the southernmost part of the Kasaragod district, state of Kerala, India.

== Administration ==
Padne village is administered by Padne Grama Panchayat under Nileshwaram Block Panchayat. Padne Panchayat composed of the villages of Padne and Udinoor. Padne Panchayat is politically a part of Thrikaripur (State Assembly constituency) in Kasaragod (Lok Sabha constituency).

== Demographics ==
As of 2011 Census, Padne village had a population of 21,009 with 9,568 males and 11,441 females. Padne village has an area of 13.06 km^{2} (5.04 sq mi) with 3,776 families residing in it. The average male female sex ratio was 1196 higher than the state average of 1084. In Padne, 13.7% of the population was under 6 years of age. Padne village had an average literacy of 92.6% higher than the national average of 74% and lower than state average of 94%: male literacy was 96.2% and female literacy was 89.7%.

== Economy ==
One major industry in Padanna is mussel farming, originally popularized by the CMFR Institute. As of 2001, it was estimated that over 200 Padanna families were engaged in backwater mussel cultivation. In 2007, a theme village called "Oyster Opera at Padanna" was opened to showcase the mussel farming done in Padanna and other nearby villages. The tourist site includes demonstrations of mussel farming, local folk art, and cuisine highlighting the locally harvested mussels.

== Religion ==
Residents of Padanna include Muslims, Hindus and Christians. The main holy sites are Padanna Juma Masjid, Sree Mundya Temple, Town Salafi Masjid, Town Moiddeen Masjid, and many other masjid and temples.

== Education ==
- V K P K H M M R V H S School
- G U P School
- KHIDMATHUL ISLAM English School
- MYMA English School
- I C T English School

== Humanitarian work ==
Autorikshaw drivers of Padanna village spend the income of one day every month to transport poor kidney patient to dialysis centers. This initiative is undertaken by Swathantra Thozhilali Union.

== Transportation ==
Local roads have access to NH.66 which connects to Mangalore in the north and Kannur in the south. The nearest railway station is Cheruvathur on Mangalore-Palakkad line. There are airports at Mangalore and Kannur.

== See also ==
- Kanhangad
- Cheruvathur
- Nileshwaram
- Kasaragod
- Uduma
- Panathur
- Bekal
- Kayoor
- Kinanoor
- Kavvayi
- Pilicode
