= Thimiri (Kasaragod) =

Village in Kerala, India

- village
- Location in Kerala, India Thimiri (India)
- Coordinates: 12.2244°N 75.1823°E
- Country: India
- State: Kerala
- District: Kasaragod
- Taluk: Hosdurg

Government
  - Body: Kayyur-Cheemeni Grama Panchayat

Area
  - Total: 8.12 km^{2} (3.14 sq mi)

Population (2011)
  - Total: 5,511
  - Density: 679/km^{2} (1,760/sq mi)

Languages
  - Official: Malayalam, English
- Time zone: UTC+5:30 (IST)
- PIN: 671313
- Vehicle registration: KL-60

Thimiri is a village in Hosdurg taluk of Kasaragod district in Kerala state, India. Thimiri is located 3 km east of Cheruvathur on Cheruvathur-Cheemeni road.

== Demographics ==
As of 2011 Census, Thimiri village had total population of 5,511 which constitutes 2,640 males and 2,871 females. Thimiri village has an area of 8.12 km^{2} (3.14 sq mi) with 1,344 families residing in it. The sex ratio of Thimiri was 1087, higher than state average of 1084. In Thimiri, Population of children under 6 years was 10.6%. Thimiri had overall literacy of 93% where male literacy stands at 96.3% and female literacy was 89.9%.

== Administration ==
Thimiri village is part of Kayyur-Cheemeni Grama Panchayat in Nileshwaram Block Panchayat. Thimiri village is politically a part of Thrikaripur (State Assembly constituency) which belongs to Kasaragod Loksabha constituency.

== Transport ==
NH 66 is easily accessible from Cheruvathur town. Mangalore and Mumbai can be accessed on the northern side and Kochi and Trivandrum on the southern side. The nearest railway station is Cheruvathur railway station on Shoranur-Mangalore Section under Southern railway. The nearest international airports are at Kannur and Mangalore.
