= Hosdurg taluk =

Tehsil in Kerala, India

- Taluk
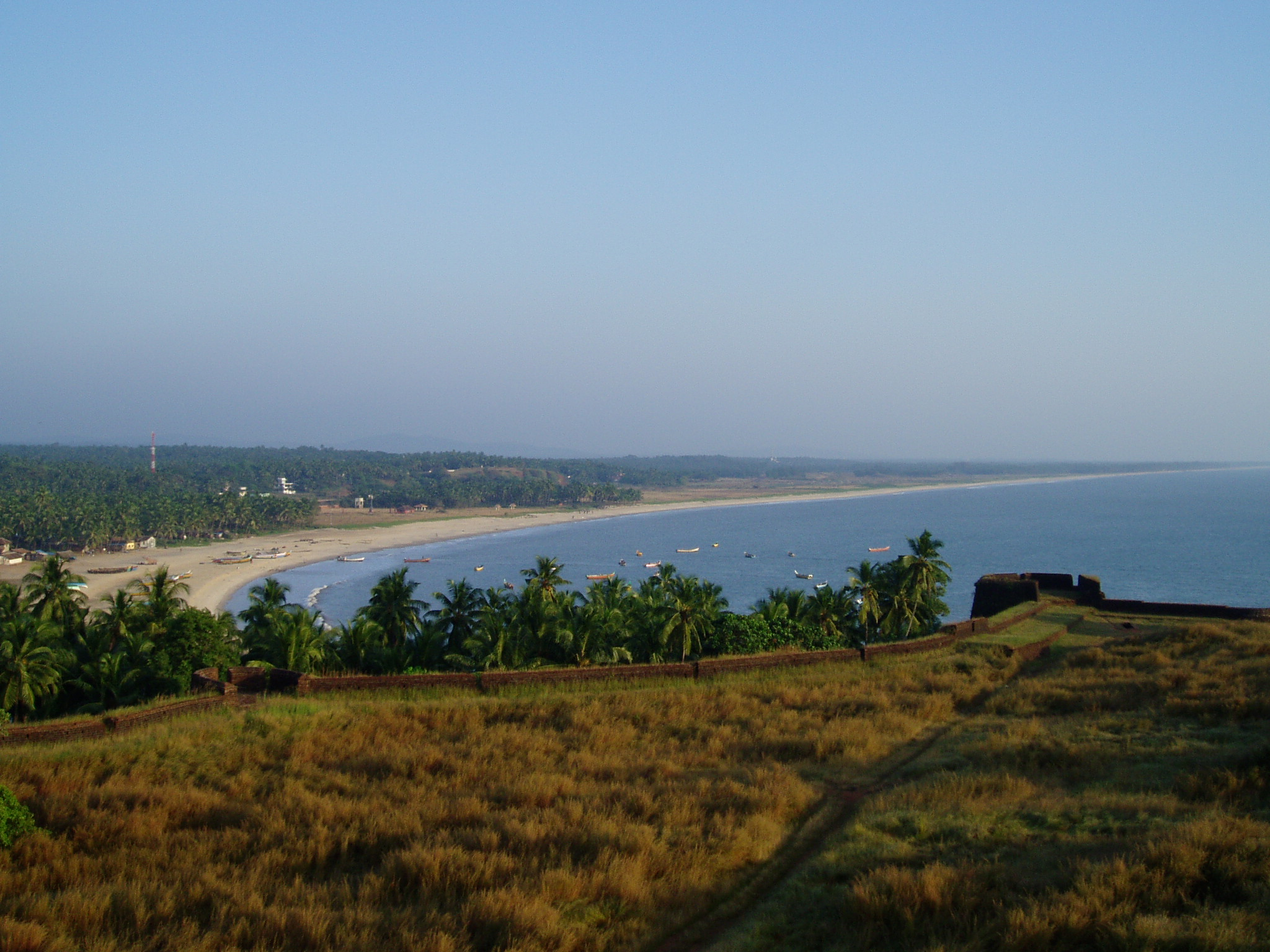
- Bekal Fort in Hosdurg Taluk

- Location in Kerala, India
- Coordinates: 12.3059°N 75.0947°E
- Country: India
- State: Kerala
- District: Kasaragod

Government
  - Tehsildar: Premraj P

Area
  - Total: 442 km^{2} (171 sq mi)

Population (2011)
  - Total: 448,484
  - Density: 1,010/km^{2} (2,630/sq mi)

Languages
  - Official: Malayalam, English
- Time zone: UTC+5:30 (IST)
- PIN: 671xxx
- Telephone code: 0467
- Vehicle registration: KL 60
- Lok Sabha constituency: Kasaragod
- Vidhan Sabha constituency: Kanhangad, Thrikaripur

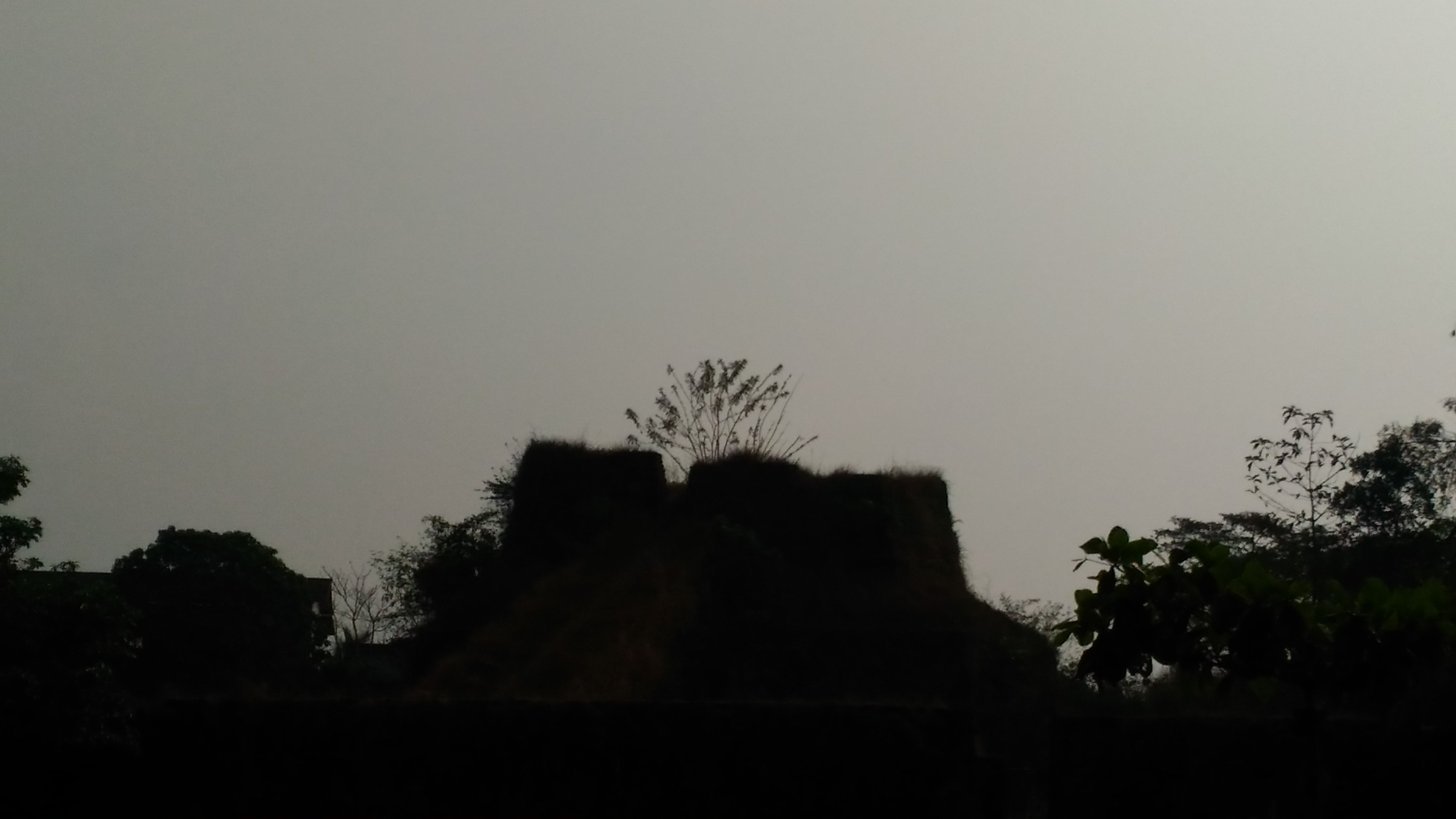
Hosdurg fort

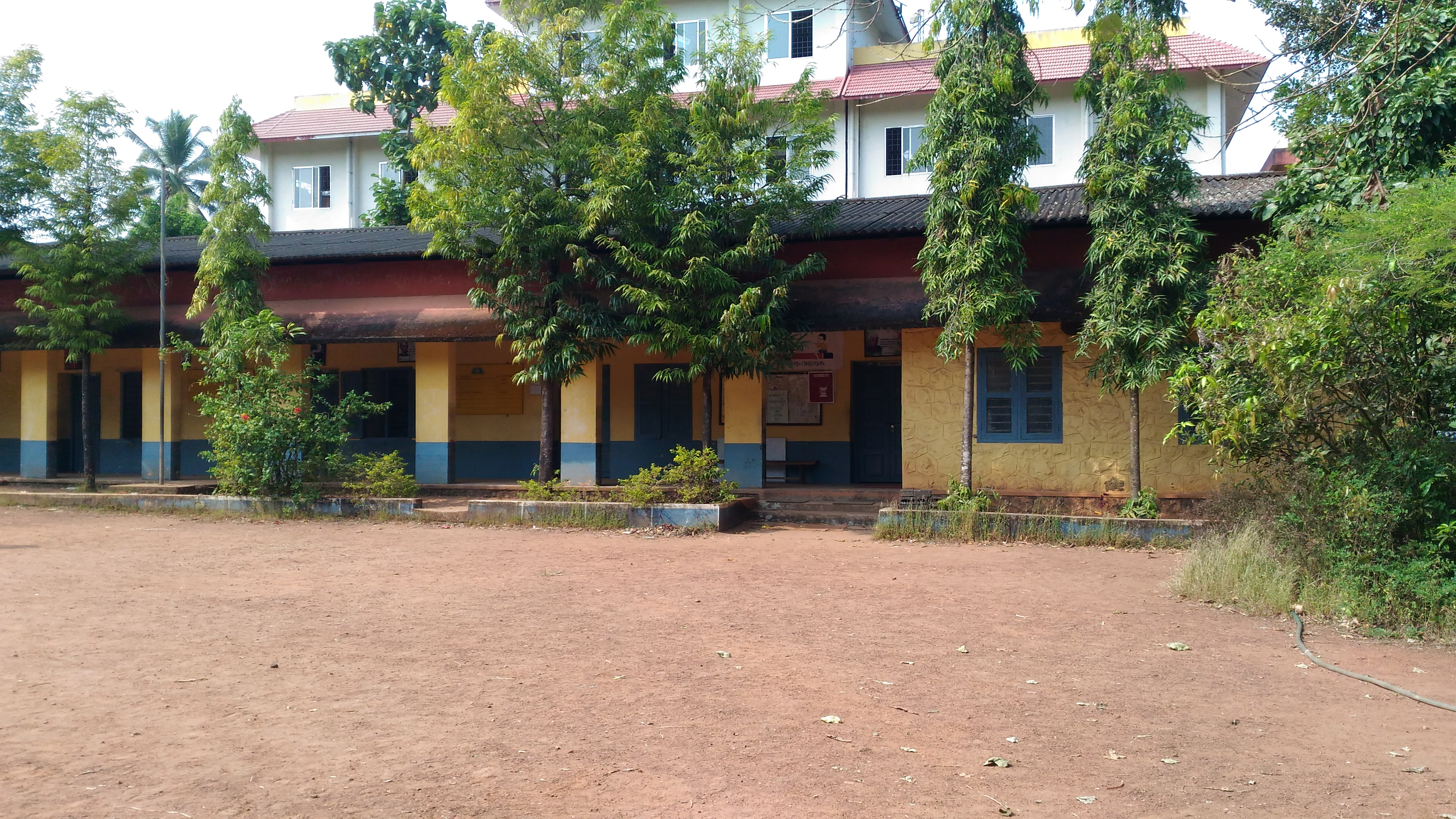
GHSS Hosdurg, board school, Hosdurg

Hosdurg is one of four taluks that constitute the Kasaragod District, Kerala. Others are Kasaragod, Manjeshwaram and Vellarikundu taluks. In the north, it borders Kasaragod taluk; in south, the Kannur District; in the east, Vellarikundu taluk; and in the west, the Arabian Sea. With an area of 900.3 km^{2} (90030 hectares), it was the smaller of the two taluks. Then Hosdurg bifurcated into Vellarikund and Hosdurg taluks in 2013 for ease of administration. Kanhangad and Nileshwaram are the municipalities within the taluk. Hosdurg (after which the taluk is named) is a kilometer south of Kanhangad town, the latter being the taluk headquarters. Other major settlements include Thrikaripur, Cheruvathur and Udma. Bekal Fort tourism is situated in the taluk.

== Etymology ==
The name Hosdurg is derived from the Kannada word Hosa ("new") and Sanskrit word Durg ("fortress").

== Demographics ==
As per the 2011 census, Hosdurg taluk had a total population of 625641 persons, which included 295,859 males and 329,782 females. The literacy rate is 85.82%, higher than the national average. In Hosdurg taluk, 12.42% of the total population is between the ages of 0–6 years. Malayalam is the administrative language of the region.

Religions in Hosdurg Subdistrict (2011)
1. Hinduism (63.5%)
2. Islam (25.5%)
3. Christianity (10.9%)
4. Other (0.10%)

== Constituent Villages ==
Hosdurg taluk has 31 revenue villages. They are: Ajanur, Ambalathara, Balla, Bare, Cheemeni, Cheruvathur, Chithari, Hosdurg, Kanhangad, Kayyur, Keekan, Kilayikode, Kodakkad, Madikai, Maniyat, Nileshwaram, North Trikkarippur, Padanna, Pallikkara, Pallikkara-II, Panayal, Periya, Perole, Pilicode, Pudukai, Pullur, South Trikkarippur, Thimiri, Thuruthi, Uduma, Udinoor and Valiyaparamba.

== See also ==
- Kasaragod taluk
- Vellarikundu
