= Thrikaripur Assembly constituency =

Constituency of the Kerala legislative assembly in India

Thrikaripur
- Constituency No. 5 for the Kerala Legislative Assembly
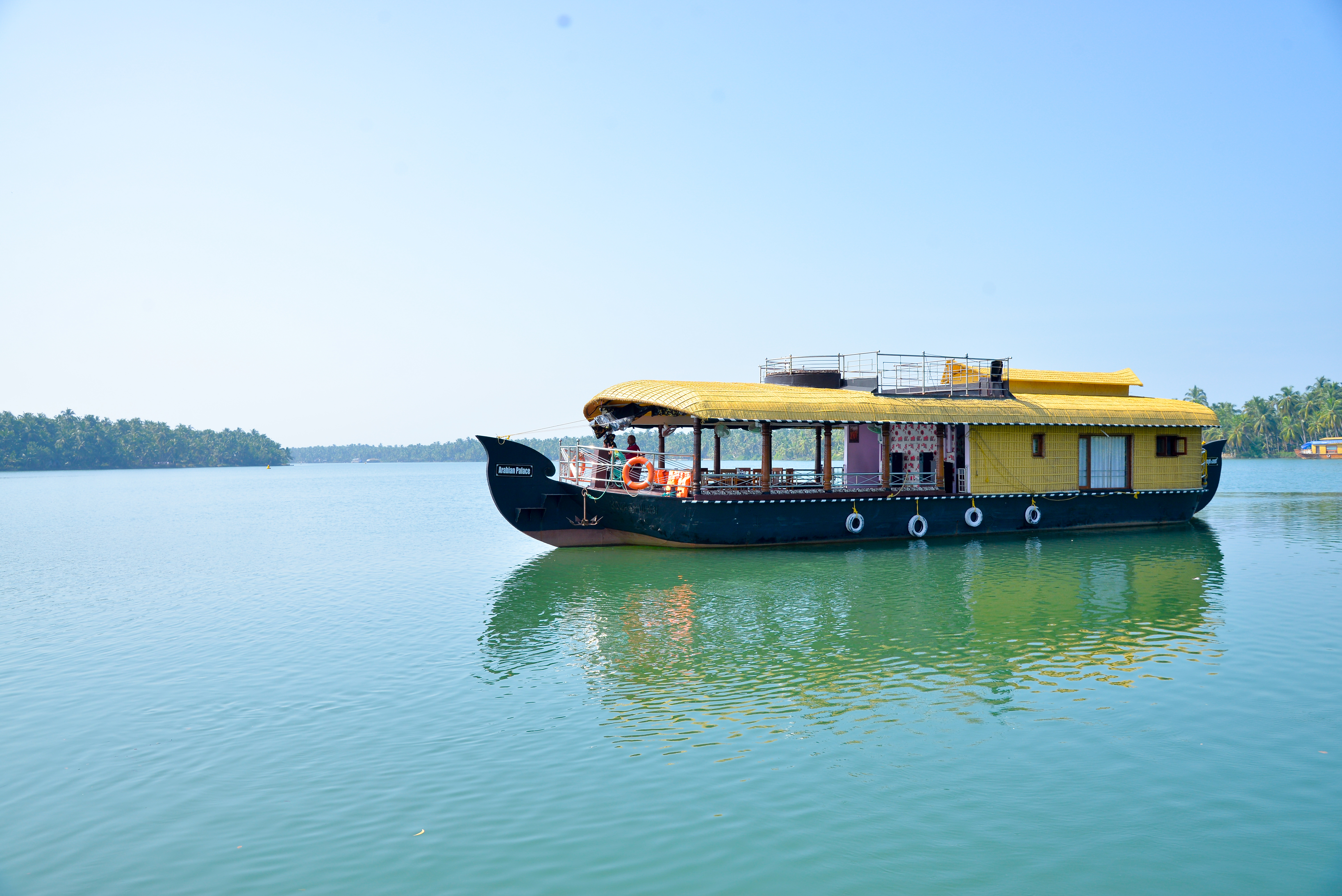
- Nileshwaram in Thrikaripur Assembly constituency

Constituency details
- Country: India
- Region: South India
- State: Kerala
- District: Kasaragod
- Established: 1977
- Total electors: 2,02,249 (2021)
- Reservation: None

Member of Legislative Assembly
- 16th Kerala Legislative Assembly
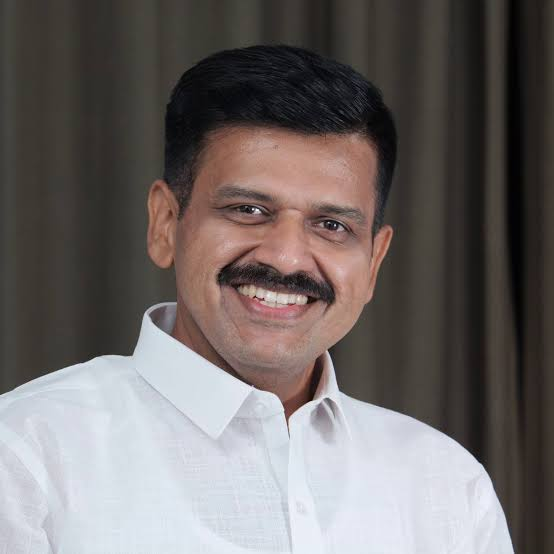
- Incumbent Sandeep Varier
- Party: Indian National Congress
- Alliance: UDF
- Elected year: 2026
- Preceded by: M. Rajagopalan

Thrikaripur Assembly constituency, previously Nileshwaram Assembly constituency, is one of the 140 state legislative assembly constituencies in Kerala in southern India. It is also one of the seven state legislative assembly constituencies included in Kasaragod Lok Sabha constituency. As of the 2026 Assembly elections, the current MLA is Sandeep Varier of Indian National Congress.

Thrikaripur Assembly constituency came into existence in 1977. It was created by replacing Nileshwaram Assembly constituency, which had existed from 1957 to 1977.

== Local self-governed segments ==
Thrikaripur Assembly constituency is composed of the following local self-governed segments:

Sl no.	Name	Status (Grama panchayat/Municipality)	Taluk
1	Nileshwaram	Municipality	Hosdurg
2	Cheruvathur	Grama panchayat	Hosdurg
3	Padne	Grama panchayat	Hosdurg
4	Pilicode	Grama panchayat	Hosdurg
5	Thrikaripur	Grama panchayat	Hosdurg
6	Valiyaparamba	Grama panchayat	Hosdurg
7	Kayyur-Cheemeni	Grama panchayat	Hosdurg
8	East Eleri	Grama panchayat	Vellarikundu
9	West Eleri	Grama panchayat	Vellarikundu

== Members of Legislative Assembly ==
The following list contains all members of Kerala Legislative Assembly who have represented the constituency:

Year	Member	Political party
As Nileshwaram
1957	E. M. S. Namboodiripad	Communist Party of India
1960	C. Kunhikrishnan Nair	Indian National Congress
1967	V. V. Kunhambu	Communist Party of India (Marxist)
1970	V. V. Kunhambu	Communist Party of India (Marxist)
As Thrikaripur
1977	P. Karunakaran	Communist Party of India (Marxist)
1980	P. Karunakaran	Communist Party of India (Marxist)
1982	O. Bharathan	Communist Party of India (Marxist)
1987	E. K. Nayanar	Communist Party of India (Marxist)
1991	E. K. Nayanar	Communist Party of India (Marxist)
1996	K. P. Satheesh Chandran	Communist Party of India (Marxist)
2001	K. P. Satheesh Chandran	Communist Party of India (Marxist)
2006	K. Kunhiraman	Communist Party of India (Marxist)
2011	K. Kunhiraman	Communist Party of India (Marxist)
2016	M. Rajagopalan	Communist Party of India (Marxist)
2021	M. Rajagopalan	Communist Party of India (Marxist)
2026	Sandeep Varier	Indian National Congress

== Election results ==
=== 2026 ===
2026 Kerala Legislative Assembly election: Thrikaripur
Party	Candidate	Votes	%	±%
INC	Sandeep Varier	83,109	48.63	▲11.22
CPI(M)	V. P. P. Mustafa	78,678	46.04	▼7.67
TTP	Ravi Kulangara	7,837	4.59	▼2.24
Independent	Sandeep Elatt	258	0.15	−
Independent	Musthafa P. P.	169	0.10	−
Independent	Musthafa V. P.	143	0.08	−
NOTA	None of the above	710	0.42	−
Margin of victory		4,431	2.59	▼13.71
Turnout		1,70,904	81.00	▲2.05
INC gain from CPI(M)		Swing	▲11.22	

By Local body Segments
No.	Status (Local body)	Votes			Lead
No.	Status (Local body)	Sandeep Varier	V. P. P. Musthafa	Ravi Kulangara	Lead
1	Nileshwar Municipality	11,532	11,520	2,201	12
2	Kayyur-Cheemeni	4,457	10,460	478	6,003
3	West Eleri	11,560	8,349	707	3,211
4	East Eleri	10,061	4,031	473	6,030
5	Cheruvathur	8,939	9,865	596	926
6	Pilicode	4,959	12,615	946	7,656
7	Padne	8,972	6,463	449	2,509
8	Valiyaparamba	5,049	4,163	267	886
9	Thrikaripur	16,171	9,231	1,567	6,940

=== 2021 ===
2021 Kerala Legislative Assembly election: Thrikaripur
Party	Candidate	Votes	%	±%
CPI(M)	M. Rajagopalan	86,151	53.71	▲2.78
KEC	M. P. Joseph	60,014	37.41	
BJP	Shibin T. V.	10,961	6.83	▼0.09
SDPI	Liyakathali P.	1,211	0.75	
WPOI	T. Mahesh Master	817	0.51	
NOTA	NOTA	558	0.35	
Margin of victory		26,137	16.30	▲5.41
Turnout		1,60,408	78.95	▼2.21
CPI(M) hold		Swing		

=== 2016 ===
There were 1,90,119 registered voters in the constituency for the 2016 election.

2016 Kerala Legislative Assembly election: Thrikkaripur
Party	Candidate	Votes	%	±%
CPI(M)	M. Rajagopalan	79,286	50.93	▲1.02
INC	K. P. Kunhikannan	62,327	40.04	▼3.42
BJP	M. Bhaskaran	10,767	6.92	▲2.91
WPOI	C. H. Muthalib	1.029	0.66	−
SDPI	M. V. Shaukathali	840	0.54	▼3.47
NOTA	None of the above	774	0.50	−
Independent	P. P. Purushottaman	263	0.17	−
Independent	K. P. Kunhikannan Kandothumpurath	183	0.12	−
Independent	Kunjikannan P. M. Kuruvattu Veedu	109	0.07	−
Independent	K. M. Sreedharan	93	0.06	−
Margin of victory		16,959	10.89	▲4.44
Turnout		1,55,671	81.88	▲1.60
CPI(M) hold		Swing	▲1.02	

=== 2011 ===
There were 1,78,139 registered voters in the constituency for the 2011 election.

2011 Kerala Legislative Assembly election: Thrikkaripur
Party	Candidate	Votes	%	±%
CPI(M)	K. Kunhiraman	67,871	49.91	
INC	K. V. Gangadharan	59,106	43.46	
BJP	T. Radhakrishnan	5,450	4.01	
SDPI	Razak Haji Parambath	5,450	4.01	
BSP	Arun Kumar	1,031	0.76	
Independent	K .K .Dileep Kumar	789	0.58	−
Margin of victory		8,765	6.45	
Turnout		1,35,988	80.28	
CPI(M) hold		Swing		

=== 2006 ===
2006 Kerala Legislative Assembly election: Thrikkaripur
Party	Candidate	Votes	%	±%
CPI(M)	K. Kunhiraman	81,050	55.91	
INC	A. V. Vamana Kumar	57,222	39.47	
BJP	T. Kunhiraman	4,164	2.87	
Independent	P. Haridas	1,109	0.77	
Independent	A. K. Thampan	762	0.53	
BSP	U. Balakrishnan	653	0.45	
Margin of victory		23,828	16.44	
Turnout		1,44,960	78.32	
CPI(M) hold		Swing		

=== 2001 ===
2001 Kerala Legislative Assembly election: Thrikaripur
Party	Candidate	Votes	%	±%
CPI(M)	K. P. Satheesh Chandran	79,874	55.15	
INC	Karimbil Krishnan	62,865	43.41	
Independent	P. V. Chandran	2,089	1.44	
Margin of victory		17,009	11.74	
Turnout		1,44,921	79.30	
CPI(M) hold		Swing		

=== 1996 ===
1996 Kerala Legislative Assembly election: Thrikaripur
Party	Candidate	Votes	%	±%
CPI(M)	K. P. Satheesh Chandran	71,234	53.80	
INC	Sony Sebastian	55,486	41.91	
BJP	K. Kunhiraman	4,097	3.09	
PDP	P. K. C. Ahammed	508	0.38	
Independent	Issac Devassia	329	0.25	
Independent	Hameed Madampillath	295	0.22	
Independent	K. V. Kamalakshan	153	0.12	
Independent	M. Abdul Nasser	119	0.09	
Independent	Sukumaran Korakkad	104	0.08	
Independent	Gopalan Padinjareveettil	78	0.06	
Margin of victory		15,748	11.89	
Turnout		1,32,403	76.16	
CPI(M) hold		Swing		

=== 1991 ===
1991 Kerala Legislative Assembly election: Thrikaripur
Party	Candidate	Votes	%	±%
CPI(M)	E. K. Nayanar	69,437	53.64	
INC	C. K. Sreedharan	55,105	42.57	
BJP	V. K. Velu Nair	3,229	2.49	
Independent	N. Muhammed	288	0.22	
Independent	N. Hariharan	157	0.12	
Independent	Balakrishnan	110	0.45	
Independent	P. V. Ramachandran	101	0.08	
Independent	A. K. Mohanan	77	0.06	
Independent	M. Kunhiraman	66	0.05	
Independent	T. P. Asinar	63	0.05	
Independent	P. K. Mohammed Kunhi	28	0.02	
Margin of victory		14,332	11.07	
Turnout		1,29,459	78.45	
CPI(M) hold		Swing		

=== 1987 ===
1987 Kerala Legislative Assembly election: Thrikaripur
Party	Candidate	Votes	%	±%
CPI(M)	E. K. Nayanar	56,037	49.91	
INC	K. Kunhikrishnan Nair	49,620	44.20	
BJP	K. V. Laxmanan	3,328	2.96	
CMP	Alice Krishnan	1,416	1.26	
Independent	M. Govindan	469	0.41	
Independent	K. K. Chellappan	347	0.30	
Independent	Thomas Koottumkkal	340	0.30	
Independent	P. M. Michel	158	0.14	
Margin of victory		6,417	5.71	
Turnout		1,12,272	85.70	
CPI(M) hold		Swing		

=== 1982 ===
1982 Kerala Legislative Assembly election: Thrikaripur
Party	Candidate	Votes	%	±%
CPI(M)	O. Bharathan	48,197	56.87	
KEC	K. T. Mathai	35,995	42.47	
Margin of victory		12,205	14.40	
Turnout		84,739	79.45	
CPI(M) hold		Swing		

== See also ==
- Thrikaripur
- Kasaragod district
- List of constituencies of the Kerala Legislative Assembly
- 2016 Kerala Legislative Assembly election
