= Kayyur–Cheemeni Gram Panchayat =

Kayyur–Cheemeni കയ്യൂർ–ചീമേനി
- Grama Panchayat
- Interactive map of Kayyur–Cheemeni
- State: Kerala
- District: Kasargod

Government
  - Type: Panchayati raj (India)
  - Body: Kayyur-Cheemeni Grama Panchayat panchayat

Area
  - Total: 72.7 km^{2} (28.1 sq mi)

Population (2011)
  - Total: 27,585
  - Density: 379/km^{2} (983/sq mi)

Languages
  - Official: Malayalam, English
  - Spoken: Malayalam
- Time zone: UTC+5:30 (IST)

Kayyur–Cheemeni is a Gram Panchayat in Kasargod district of Kerala. The gram panchayat, which covers an area of 72.70 km^{2} and is located in the Neeleswaram block of Hosdurg taluk in Kasaragod district. This gram panchayat includes Kayyur, Cheemeni, Thimiri and Klayikode villages. There are 16 wards in this gram panchayat.

== Boundaries ==
- South - Pilikode Grama Panchayat, Kankol-Alappadamba Grama Panchayat and Karivellur-Peralam Grama Panchayat in Kannur district
- North - Kinnaur-Karinthalam and West Eleri panchayats
- East - West Eleri and Peringom Vayakara Panchayats in Kannur district
- West - Neeleswaram and Cheruvathur panchayats

== Statistics ==
District	Kasargod
Block	Nileshwar
Area	72.70 km^{2}
Population	24,615
Density of population	379.44

== Wards ==
1. Klayikkode
2. Muzhakkom
3. Kukkottu
4. Kayyur
5. Cheriyakkara
6. Podavur
7. Pallippara
8. Kundyam
9. Chanadukkam
10. Pattoli
11. Cheemeni
12. Challuvakode
13. Munda
14. Chembrakanam
15. Thimiri
16. Nalilamkandam
