= Kayyur incident =

1941 communist uprising in British India

Kayyur Incident
- Part of Communist-led peasant uprisings in British India
Date	March 28, 1941
Location	Kayyur, Kasaragod, Madras Presidency (present-day Kerala, India) 12.262641°N 75.188907°E
Result	Suppression of protest; execution of four communist activists

Belligerents
(United Kingdom) British Raj	Peasants of Kayyur; Communist Party of India

Commanders and leaders
British colonial police authorities Malabar Special Police	Madathil Appu, Podora Kunjambu Nair, Koithattil Chirukandan, Pallikkal Abu Bakr

Strength
Unknown	Hundreds of local peasants

Casualties and losses
1 police constable drowned	4 executed, many arrested and tortured

Kayyur incident also known as Kayyur uprising or Kayyur Revolt is a series of incidents that occurred in Kayyur village of present-day Kasaragod district during British rule in India. The peaceful farmers protest on 1941 March 28 turned violent and the mob accidentally killed a policeman. 61 were trialed for this violent deed and 4 persons were sentenced to death.

== Background ==
Karnataka and Kasaragod district (which was part of South Canara earlier) were ruled by the Ikkeri Nayakas and the subsequent Kingdom of Mysore. These areas came under the control of the British after the defeat of Tipu Sultan in the Battle of Srirangapatna in 1799. With the enactment of the Permanent Settlement Act by the British, the landlord-tenant system came into existence, which made a section of the landlords dependent on the British and began to exploit the common people.

As the Kasaragod region was part of the South Canara district, the tenancy law which was compulsory in Malabar did not come into force in this area. As a result, the tax levied here was higher than that imposed in the Malabar region. Since these areas were under the rule of the Nileshwaram dynasty, it was the Nileshwaram dynasty that collected taxes from the farmers and paid them to the British.

Socialist leaders like P. Krishnapillai, A.K.G. and Congress leader T. S. Thirumumpu were at the forefront of organizing the farmers in the Kayyur region. The Karshaka Sangam (farmers' group) decided to protest against the tax collection like 'Vechu Kanal', 'Noori', 'Mukkal', 'Sheelakash' etc. imposed by the landlords on the farmers. One of the main demands of the farmers was that the Malabar Tenancy Act be enacted in Hosdurg as well. As the first stage of the struggle, they decided to bring farmers from different parts in a procession and decided to file a petition against the collections to Nileswaram Raja, the landlord of the area, on 30 March 1941.

Those who decided to defeat the peasant struggle reported to the British authorities that the peasantry activists were going to 'set fire to the Nileswaram Kovilakam'. On 25 March 1941, during a march of agricultural workers in Kayyur, Nileshwaram Sub-Inspector Nicholas arrested peasant activists T. V. Kunjambhu and T. V. Kunhiraman. The district magistrate issued arrest warrants against K. P. Vellunga, Choorikkadan Krishnan Nair, Koithattil Chirukandan and Valappil Raman under the Defense of India Rule for anti-war activities.

The activities of communist leaders like E. K. Nayanar, Subramanya Shenoy and A. V. Kunhambu, who were secretly working in Kayyur region after the Morazha incident also helped in protests against landlords in the Kayyur region. A demonstration was held on 12 March 1941, in Kayyur demanding the release of the accused in the Morazha case. Police took action following this. The policeman who came with the arrest warrant was assaulted and as a revenge police attacked villagers on 27 March. Several people, including Madathil Appu, were injured.

== Incident on 1941 March 28 ==
The march started from various parts of Kayyur on the afternoon of the 28th against the police brutality on the 27th. Subbarayan, a specially deployed police officer in Kayyur, who led the attack the previous day, accidentally came to the front of a march. When people in the march planned to attack Subbarayan, the elders in the procession denied the attack and made him carry the flag and march in front. When Subbarayan started walking with the flag, he hit someone with a stick tied to the flag and tried to run away. But he saw another march ahead and he jumped into the Karyamcode (Thejaswini) river and drowned.

== Aftermath ==
Consequently, 61 including E. K. Nayanar and A. V. Kunhambu were tried for this violent deed and 5 persons were sentenced to death. Nayanar was the third accused in the FIR though he was not present at the scene. Historian A Sreedharan Menon opined that the police had implicated E. K. Nayanar in the case. Nayanar later escaped from the trial as he could not be apprehended by the police.

Although there was no evidence that any of the victims assaulted the police officer, the court ruled that all those present could be considered to have "intention to kill". Since Choorikkadan Krishnan Nair was a minor, his death sentence was later commuted to life imprisonment. The four comrades, Madathil Appu, Koithattil Chirukandan, Podora Kunjambu Nair, Pallikkal Aboobacker were hanged to death in Kannur central prison on 29 March 1943.

=== Those who were hanged ===
Madathil Appu was born in 1917, the son of Ambati Anthithirian and Chirutha. Appu, who received only a basic education, entered active politics through organizations such as the Abhinav Bharat, Yuvak sangh, Indian National Congress and the Karshakasangham (peasants union). On 26 March 1941, during a police search of a riverside tea shop, he was caught fighting with police while rescuing friends.

Koithattil Chirukandan, born in 1922, was the 31st accused in the Kayyur case. He was a member of the Congress movement, the Karshaka Sangh and the working committee of the Yuvak Sangh. On 12 March 1941, Chirukandan led a procession of Congress volunteers asking where Comrade Krishna Pillai was. Chirukandan, who was arrested that day, was sentenced to two years in jail under the National Security Rule.

Potora Kunjambu Nair was born in 1911 to Kuruvadan Chandan Nair and Podora Chiruthai Amma. After his primary education, he helped his father in his work. He entered politics in 1937 through the Indian National Congress. He was a member of the Eleri Village Congress Committee, Abhinav Bharat Yuvak Sangham and Karshaka Sangham. Kunjambu Nair was the 13th accused in the Kayyur case.

Pallikkal Aboobacker was born in 1918 in Nileshwar in Kasaragod taluk. He has been a farmer activist since 1938. He joined the Communist Party of India in 1939. He was the 51st accused in the Kayyur case.

== Legacy ==
Indian government has included Kayyur martyrs in the 5th volume of Dictionary of Martyrs, India's Freedom Struggle (1857-1947) published by the Indian ministry of culture and Indian Council of Historical Research.

== Controversies ==
The role of Communist leader and former Kerala chief minister E. K. Nayanar in the Kayyur incident is a matter of controversy for a long. It is believed that Nayanar was the third accused in the FIR though he was not present at the scene, and he escaped the trial as he could not be apprehended by the police. Historian A Sreedharan Menon opined that the police had implicated E. K. Nayanar in the case. The authors of the book Nayanar: Kayyoorinte kapadamukham (meaning: Nayanar: Kayyur's Hypocrisy) say that they searched the history of the Kayyur struggle for over a year and that Nayanar's name is not even in any document or book about the incident, including the actual verdict of the Sessions Court in Mangalore.

In 2021, following the government's order to organize competitions of Independence Day celebrations based on local history, the subject given in Kasargod district was the Kayyur incident. The KPSTA, a pro - Congress teachers' union, alleged that politics was behind the choice of the subject as there are many other freedom struggles in the district other than this peasant struggle. The authorities replied that the Kayyur incident, in which four people were hanged, was an unforgettable chapter in the national freedom struggle and that the issue was chosen because there was no greater sacrifice in the district than this.

== Works on Kayyur incident ==
Kannada writer Niranjana's Chirasmarane was based on the Kayyur incident. Malayalam film director Lenin Rajendran's 1986 movie Meenamasathile Sooryan was also based on the incident. P. V. K. Panayal's novel Khanijam is also written in the context of Kayyur incident.
