= Kottappuram, Kasaragod =

Kottappuram
- Location in Kerala, India
- Coordinates: 12°14′20″N 75°07′39″E
- Country: India
- State: Kerala
- District: Kasaragod
- Taluk: Hosdurg

Government
  - Body: Nileshwar municipality

Languages
  - Official: Malayalam
- Time zone: UTC+5:30 (IST)
- PIN: 671314
- Telephone code: 0467
- Vehicle registration: KL-60

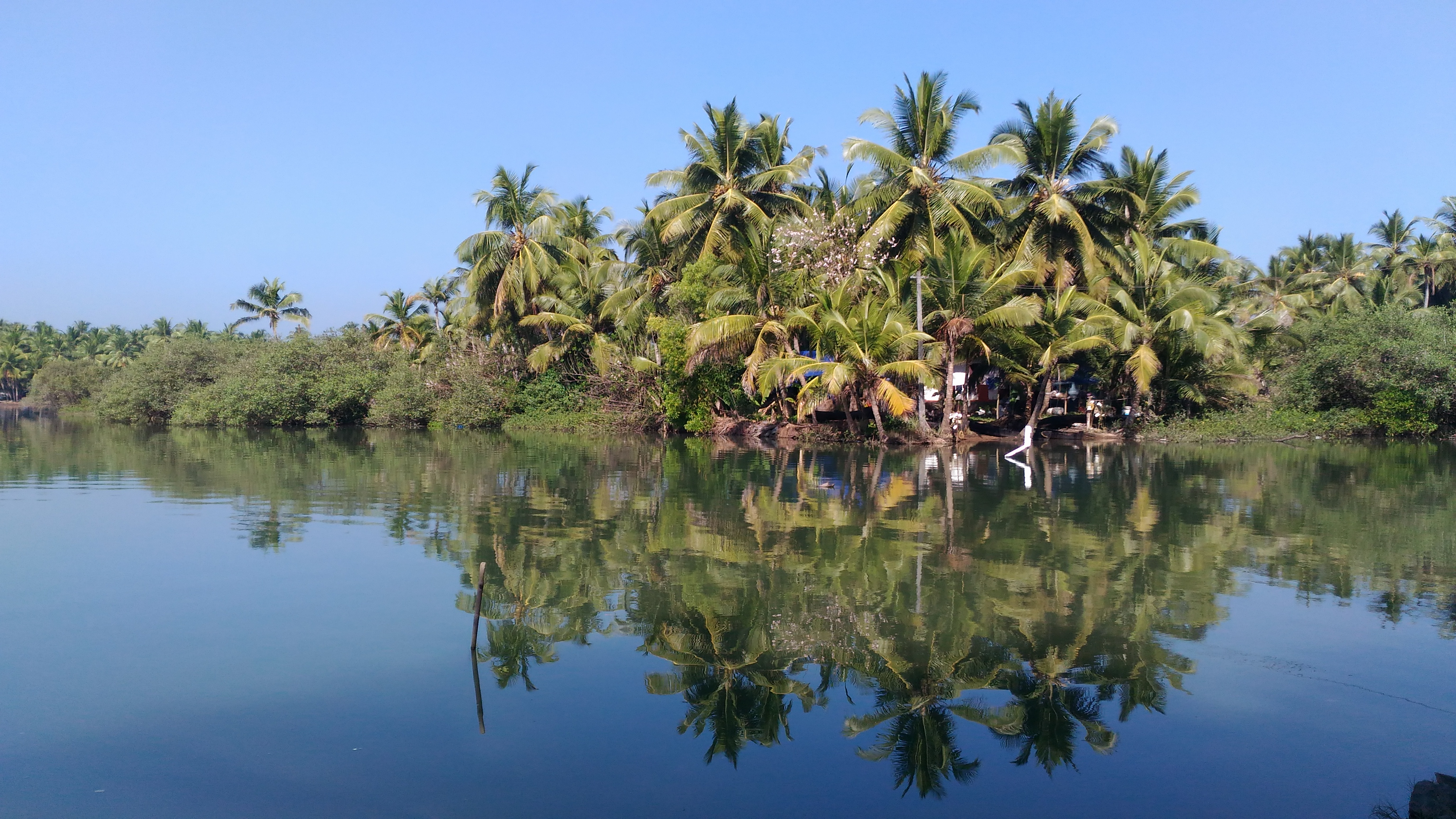
Kottappuram beach kasaragod

Kottappuram is a backwater destination, commonly known as "Valiyaparamba backwaters", located near Nileshwaram town in Kasargod district of Kerala, India. Kottappuram is situated 40 km south of Kasaragod, a part of Nileshwar municipality.

== Tourism ==
Kottappuram is known for attractions which draw large numbers of visitors, which include meandering rivers and tranquil beaches. The bridge across the river roughly marks its northern boundary. The rivers, Tejaswini and Nileshwaram, meet a short distance away before spilling jointly into the sea at Thaikadapuram. The nearest beach is at Thaikadapuram. A small fishing is located close to the estuary.

== Transportation ==
Local roads have access to NH.66 which connects to Mangalore in the north and Calicut in the south. The nearest railway station is Nileshwar on Mangalore-Palakkad line. There are airports at Mangalore and Calicut.
