= Pilicode =

- village
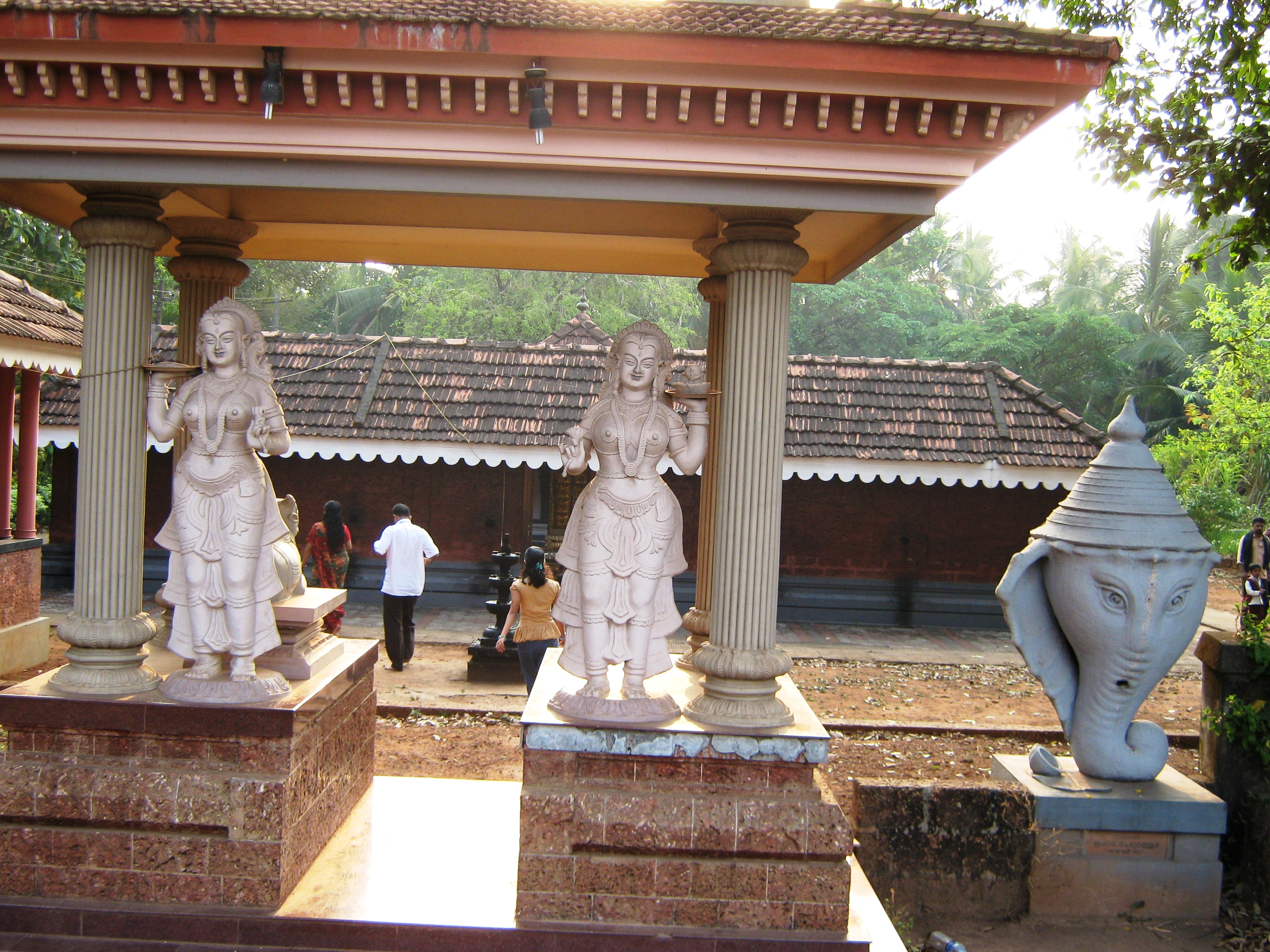
- Pilicode Shiva Temple

- Location in Kerala, India Pilicode (India)
- Coordinates: 12°11′25″N 75°10′0″E
- Country: India
- State: Kerala
- District: Kasaragod

Population (2011)
  - Total: 9,676

Languages
  - Official: Malayalam, English
- Time zone: UTC+5:30 (IST)
- Vehicle registration: KL-

Pilicode, or Pulicode, is a village in Kasaragod district in the state of Kerala, India. On 12 April 2018, Chief Minister Pinarayi Vijayan declared Pilicode as the first filament bulb-free panchayat in India as part of the Oorjayanam (ഊര്‍ജയാനം) project.

== Demographics ==
As of 2011 India census, Pilicode had a population of 9676 with 4600 males and 5076 females.

== Kerala Agricultural University ==
Kerala Agricultural University has a Regional Agricultural Research Station at Pilicode. The center was established in the year 1972. This research station conducts studies on coconut plantations and also serves as a testing center for other commodities like paddy, pulses and oilseeds. Pepper research is also carried out. The center also has an agrometeorological cell and animal science wing. There is a unique collection of coconut germplasm with 75 varieties like Philippines Ordinary, Cochin China, Java, New Guinea, and Spicata. There is a veterinary hospital and artificial insemination centre in this campus.

== Farm exhibitions ==
Kerala Agricultural University conducts periodical farm shows in Pilicode that attract many people. The show is held at 30 acres of area. The exhibits include rose garden, mango orchard, coconut groves, and crop and livestock units. There are also a few sales counters.

== Transportation ==
Local roads have access to NH.66 which connects to Mangalore in the north and Calicut in the south. The nearest railway station is Cheruvathur on Mangalore-Palakkad line. There are airports at Mangalore and Kannur International Airport.

== See also ==
- Kanhangad
- Cheruvathur
- Padanna
- Kasaragod
- Uduma
- Panathur
- Bekal
- Kayoor
- Kinanoor
- Kavvayi
- Padne
