= Padanna =

Padanna may refer to the following places in Kerala, India:

- Padne village near Cheruvathur, south of Thejaswini river, Kasaragod district
- Padannakkad village or Nileshwaram, north of Thejaswini river, Kasaragod district
- Padnekadappuram beach, part of Valiyaparamba beach in Kavvayi Backwaters
