= M. Rajagopalan =

Indian politician

- എം. രാജഗോപാലൻ
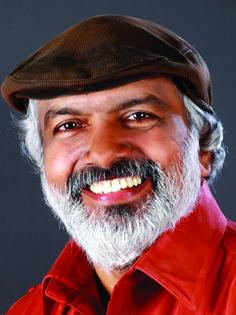

Member of the Kerala Legislative Assembly
- In office 2016–2026
- Preceded by: K. Kunhiraman
- Succeeded by: Sandeep Varier
- Constituency: Thrikaripur

Personal details
- Born: 29 May 1960 (age 65) Kayyur, Kasaragod, Kerala, India
- Party: CPI(M)
- Website: http://mrajagopalanmla.com/

M. Rajagopalan (born 29 May 1960) is an Indian politician from the CPI(M) and was the MLA of Thrikaripur in the 14th & 15th Niyamasabha.

== Career ==
Rajagopalan started his social activity through Deshabhimani Balasangham, who was a State office bearer from Kasaragod District. He was also the Union Councillor of Calicut University Union twice, a Senate Member in 1984-85 and later became its General Secretary in 1986.

He became a Director Board Member of Agro Industries Corporation, Governing Body Member of Regional Agro Industrial Development Co-operative of Kerala (RAIDCO), a member of Divisional Railway Users Consultative Committee (DRUCC), and the President of Kayyoor Service Co-operative Bank. He is currently the Chairman of Thejaswini Co-operative Hospital, Neeleswaram.

== Political career ==
Rajagopalan was the State Joint Secretary and a Central Committee Member of Students Federation of India (SFI). He was also Kasaragod District President, Secretary and State Joint Secretary of Democratic Youth Federation of India (DYFI).

He became the President of Kayyur-Cheemeni Grama Panchayat from 2000 to 2005. He is a Director Board member of CPI(M) Kasaragod District Secretariat and the Secretary of Centre of Indian Trade Unions (CITU) Kasaragod District Committee.

== Personal life ==
Rajagopalan is the son of P. Damodaran and M. Devaki. I. Lakshmikutty is his spouse. They have two children: a daughter (Aninditha. L.R) and a son (Sidharth L.R).
