= Perole =

Village in Kerala, India

- Village
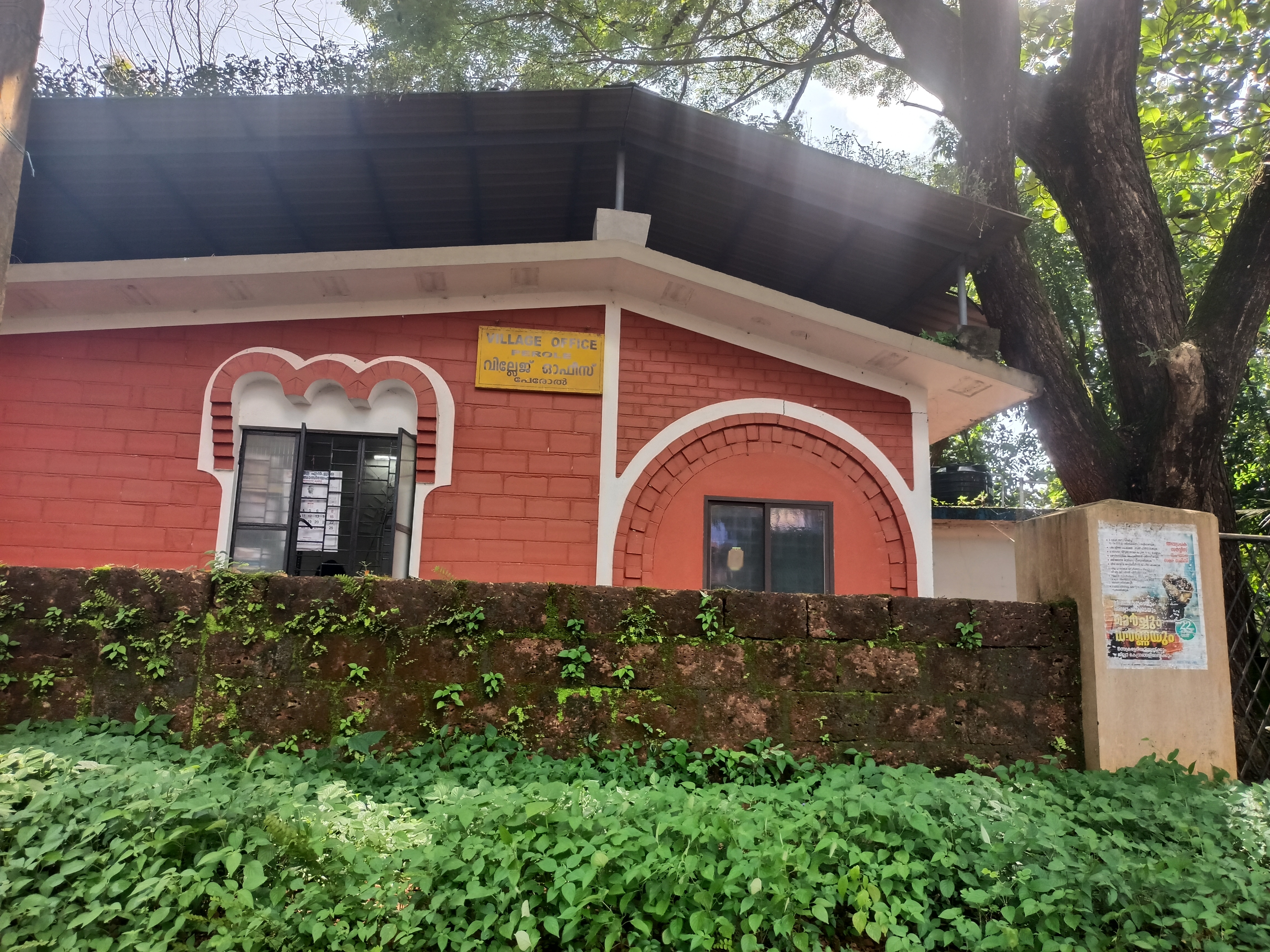
- Perole village office building

- Location in Kerala, India
- Coordinates: 12.2570°N 75.1432°E
- Country: India
- State: Kerala
- District: Kasaragod
- Taluk: Hosdurg

Government
  - Body: Nileshwaram Municipality

Area
  - Total: 13.61 km^{2} (5.25 sq mi)

Population (2011)
  - Total: 14,965
  - Density: 1,100/km^{2} (2,848/sq mi)

Languages
  - Official: Malayalam, English
- Time zone: UTC+5:30 (IST)
- PIN: 671314
- Vehicle registration: KL-60

Perole is a village and part of the Nileshwaram Municipality in Hosdurg taluk of Kasaragod district, Kerala, India. It is located 1.5 km east of Nileshwaram town.

== Demographics ==
According to 2011 Indian census, Perole had population of 14,965 of which 7,125 are males and 7,840 are females. Perole census town spreads over an area of 13.61 km^{2} with 3,748 families residing in it. The sex ratio of Perole was 1,100 higher than state average of 1,084. In Perole, population of children under 6 years was 9%. Perole had overall literacy of 91.9% lower than state average of 94%. The male literacy stands at 96.3% and female literacy was 87.9%. Hindus form 88.77% of the town’s population which is incidentally the highest in the district while Muslims form 7.26% of the population.

== Administration ==
Perole is a part of Nileshwaram Municipality. Perole is politically part of Kanhangad (State Assembly constituency) under Kasaragod (Lok Sabha constituency).

== Transportation ==
National Highway 66 passes through Nileshwaram town connects Mangalore and Mumbai in the northern side and Kochi and Thiruvananthapuram in the southern side. The nearest railway station is Nileshwar railway station.
