= Kottappuram =

Kottappuram or Kottapuram may refer to:

- Kottappuram, Kollam
- Kottappuram, Kasaragod
- Kottappuram, Thrissur
- Kottappuram, Paravur, a village in Paravur Municipality of Kollam district
