= Poomala Bhagavathy =

Hindu god

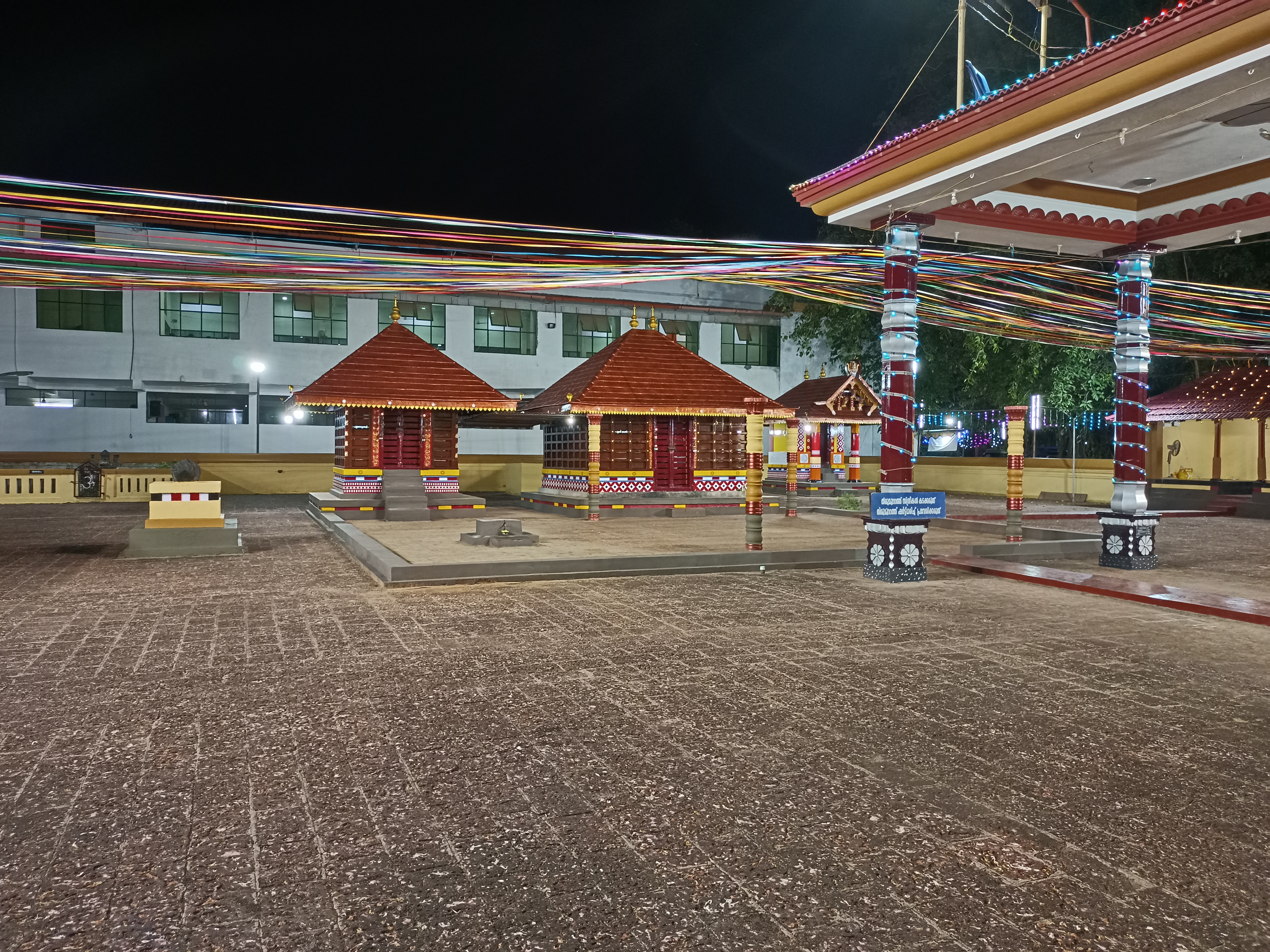
- Shrines of poomala bhagavathy and poomaruthan at Kuttamath poomala bhagavathy temple Cheruvathur, Kasaragod district
- Affiliation: Hinduism
- Region: North Malabar, Kerala, India

Poomala Bhagavathy also known as Aryapoomala is a female deity worshipped in North Malabar region in Kerala, India. Poomala is worshiped as the kuladevata of the Thiyya community. The main temples of this deity is spread over Kannur and Kasaragod districts.

== Myth ==
According to the myth, Poomala Devi was enjoying the heavenly garden with her friends. she wanted to pick flowers, but the devine guards of the garden stopped it. Poomala sought the help of one of the guard, who was shiva origin, and was resting inside a blossoming flower, in the form of wind. Devi called him by his nickname 'Poomarutha' (in Malayalam, 'Poo' means flower and 'maruthan' means wind). Thus, he became Aryapoomala's brotherly friend. Then Poomala and Poomaruthan came to earth and reached Aryapoonkavu in Arya Nadu. There they wanted to see Malanad.

One morning Aryapoonkani, the daughter of the Arya king, was gathering flowers to offer to Kamadeva, the god of fertility, when she fainted for no apparent reason. Aryapoonkani who were performing 'Pooram vratam' (a type of divine fasting to please the god kamadeva), was possessed by the goddess. As per the custom, the king consulted the astrologer and he found out that the princess was possessed by the deity, who wished to see the beauty of Malanadu.

Vishwakarmas were summoned before the King. A huge wooden ship was needed, the king demanded. Vishwakarma cut enough sandalwood and saffron and prepared a ship. The whole of the ship, which was forty-one cubits long and twenty-one cubits wide, was beautified with silk cloths. The ship headed for Malanadu with Poomala and Poomaruthan. The ship approached the Oriyara estuary in Cheruvathur. Myth says the Vishnumurthy, the god of Oriyara temple, welcomed Poomala and Poomaruthan giving them tender coconut water.

Another myth says, Poomala landed at Kuruvanthata in Ezhimala and caught up in the beauty of the countryside She avoided going back to her native land and decided to stay there. Hence Kuruvantatha and Ramanthali are believed to be the first Poomala shrines in Kerala.

== Worship ==
Poomala is worshiped mainly by the Thiyya community North Malabar. Pooram is celebrated in the temple in Meenam month of Malayalam calendar. In this, Kamadeva the god of love and fertility is being worshipped by girls who have not reached puberty. during this time Poorakkali is also performed in the temple.

== Theyyam ==
Arya Poomala Bhagwati's brother Poomaruthan is performed as Poomaruthan Theyyam. But Arya poomala does not have theyyam form.
