= Ambalathara =

Ambalathara may refer to:

- Ambalathara, Kasaragod, Kerala, India
- Ambalathara, Thiruvananthapuram, Kerala, India
- Ambalathara Sreedharan Nair, founder of Revolutionary Socialist Party (Leninist)
