= Poomaruthan Theyyam =

Indian folk dance

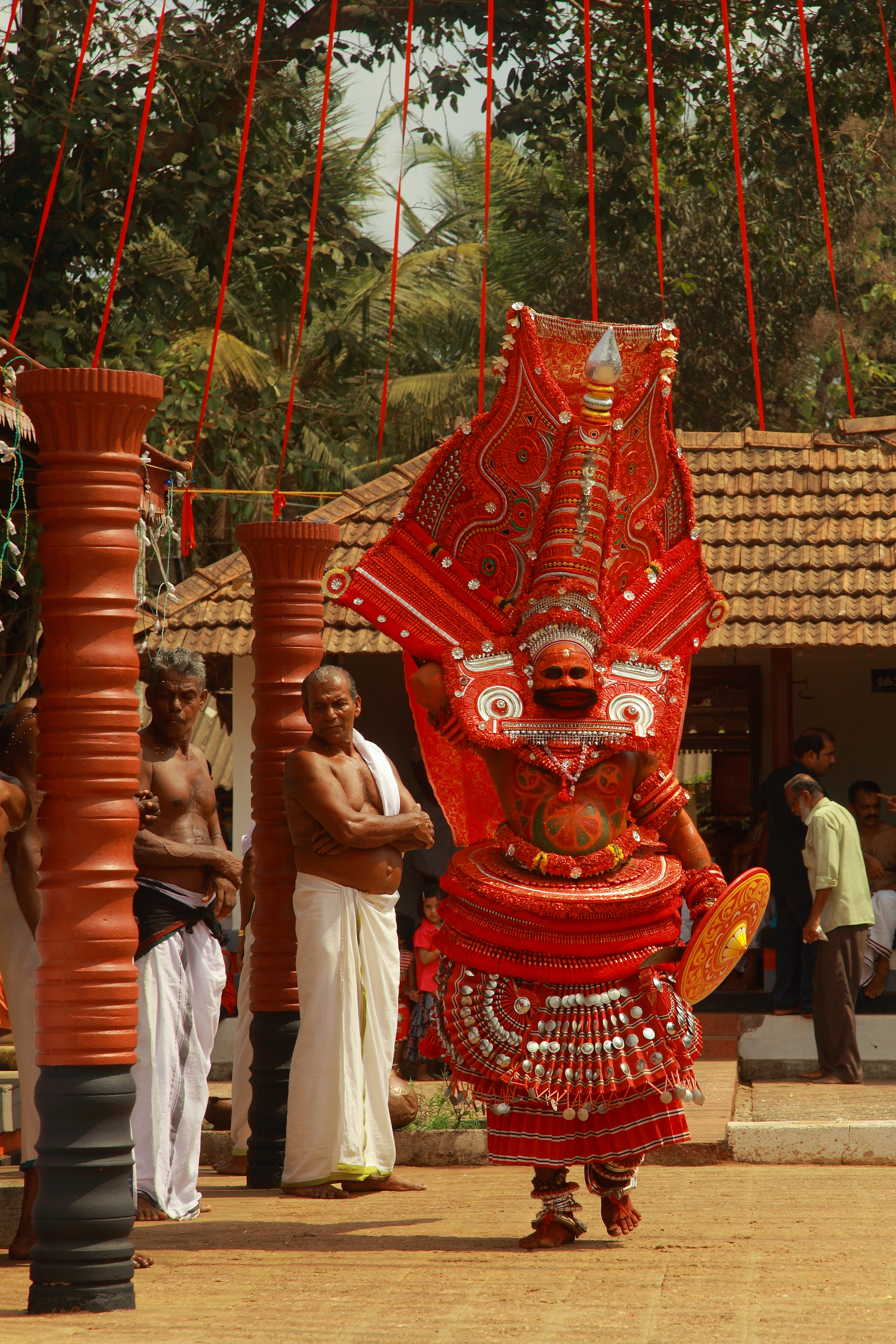
- Poomaruthan theyyam at Kuttamath Poomala temple Kaliyattam in 2016
- Native name: പൂമാരുതൻ തെയ്യം
- Genre: Ritual dance
- Origin: Kerala, India

Poomaruthan Theyyam is a Hindu god popular in the North Malabar region of Kerala, India. This theyyam is performed in the shrines of the regional Hindu goddess Poomala bhagavathy. Poomala and Poomaruthan are worshiped mainly by the Thiyya community. The main temples where this theyyam is performed are spread over Kannur and Kasaragod districts.

== Myth ==
According to the myth, Poomala Devi was enjoying the heavenly garden with her friends. she wanted to pick flowers, but the divine guards of the garden stopped it. Poomala sought the help of one of the guard, who was shiva origin, and was resting inside a blossoming flower, in the form of wind. Devi called him by his nickname 'Poomarutha' (in Malayalam, 'Poo' means flower and 'maruthan' means wind). He helped Poomala and later became her brotherly friend. Then Poomala and Poomaruthan came to earth to see Malanad.

Arya princess Aryapoonkani who was possessed by the deity Poomala, travelled with Poomaruthan in a huge wooden ship made by Vishwakarma. The ship headed for Malanadu approached the Oriyara estuary in Cheruvathur. Myth says the Vishnumurthy, the god of Oriyara temple, welcomed Poomala and Poomaruthan giving them tender coconut water. It is believed that Poomala and Poomaruthan are then enshrined in Oriyara in Kasaragod district.

Another myth says, Poomala and Poomaruthan landed at Kuruvanthata in Ezhimala and caught up in the beauty of the countryside, she avoided going back to her native land and decided to stay there. Hence Kuruvantatha and Ramanthali are also believed to be the first Poomala and Poomaruthan shrines in Kerala.

== Worship ==
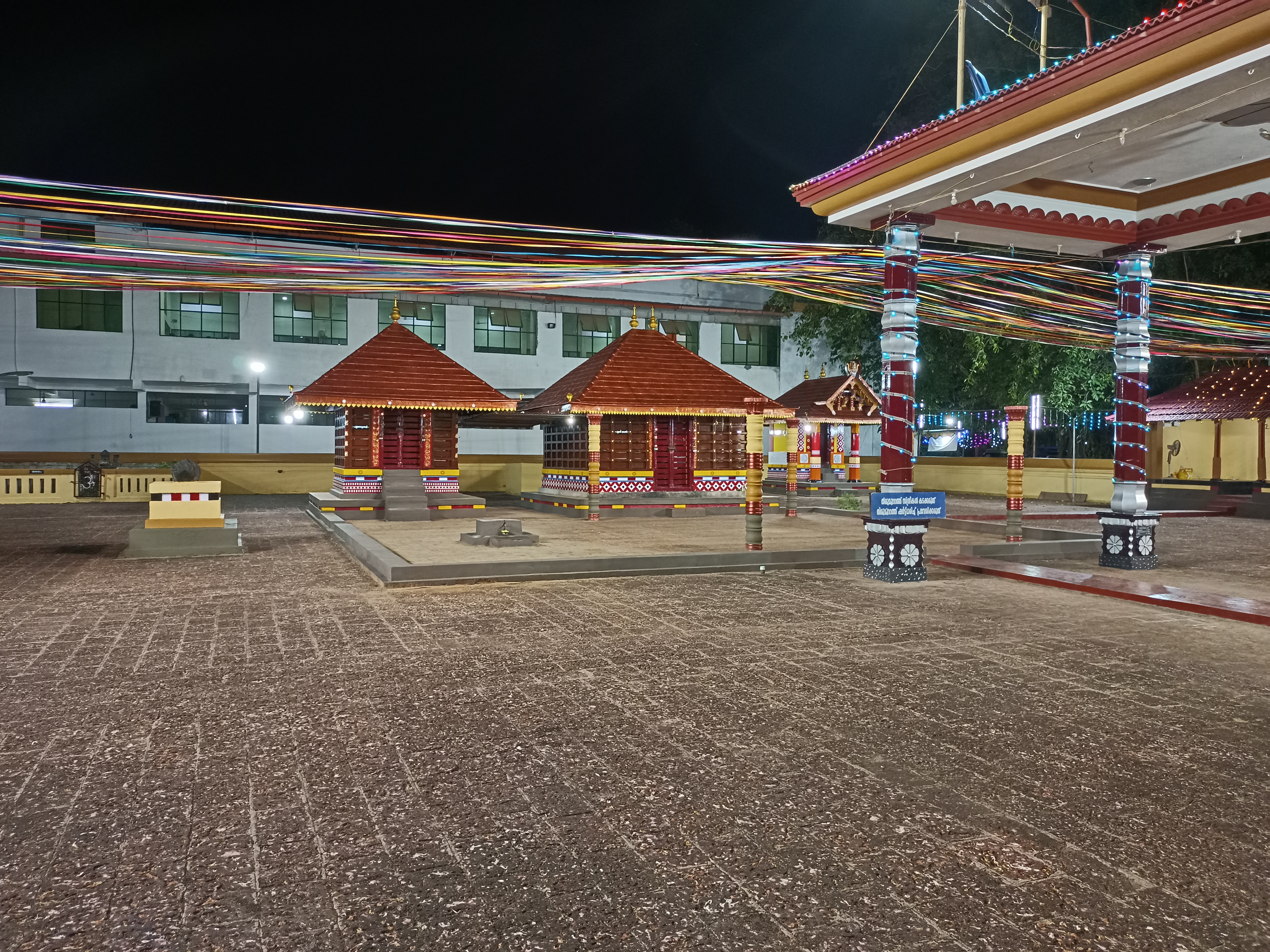
Shrines of Poomaruthan (left) and Poomala bhagavathy (right) at Kuttamath poomala bhagavathy temple, Cheruvathur, Kasaragod district, Kerala

Poomala and Poomaruthan are worshiped mainly by the Thiyya community in North Malabar. Poomaruthan is performed as in theyyam in the Poomala shrine. But the Poomala bhagavathy does not have theyyam form.

== Theyyam ==
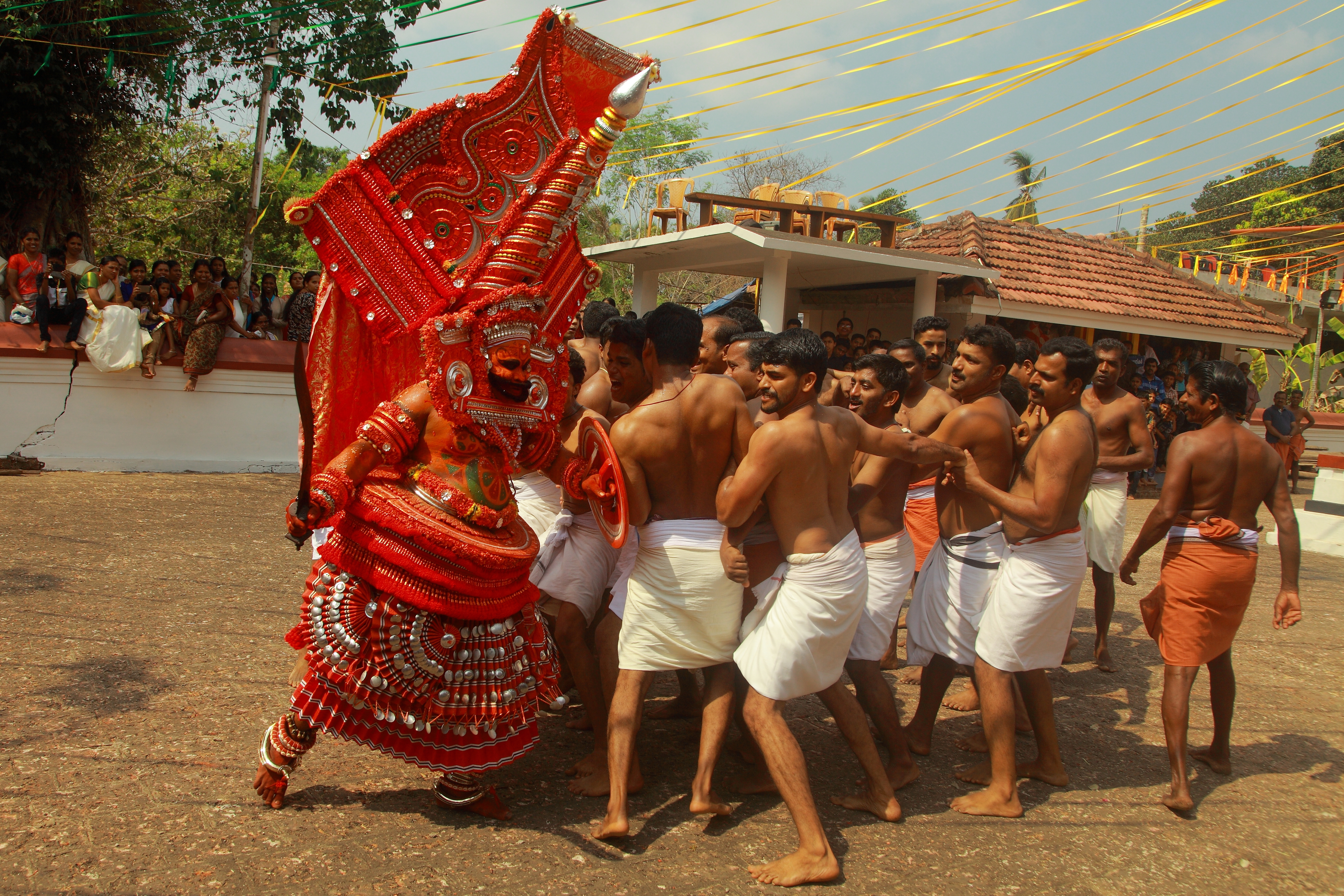
Poomaruthan theyyam knocking the valyakars with shields during Kuttamath Poomala bhagavathy temple Kaliyattam in 2016

There is special face art and body art for Poomaruthan theyyam. Theyyam also wears a costume like a black mustache and beard on his face. The head has a large wooden crown-like ornamentation, known as Mudi. The night theyyam performance known as vellattam has a small Mudi and the day theyyam has a large Mudi. Theyyam holds a sword and wooden shield in both hands. Poomaruthan's ritualistic dance is accompanied by lively movements of twirling the shield and swinging the sword. All the materials used for costumes, face art and body art are from natural substances.

Theyyam would knock the valyakars (ritual assistants associated with the temple) and even the onlookers with shields while performing. Valyakars would gather around with shouts to get hit from Theyyam and to excite Theyyam.
