= Udma (disambiguation) =

Udma or UDMA may refer to:

- Udma, a town in the Indian state of Kerala.
- Ultra Direct Memory Access (UDMA), a set of standards for Direct Memory Access (DMA) data transfer
