= Kinathil =

Village in Kasaragod, Kerala

Kinathil is a village in Kasaragod district, Kerala, India.

== Transportation ==
Local roads have access to NH.66 which connects to Mangalore in the north and Calicut in the south. The nearest railway station is Cheruvathur on Mangalore-Palakkad line. There are airports at Mangalore and Calicut.
