= KQK =

KQK or kqk may refer to:

- KQK, the Indian Railways station code for Kotikulam railway station, Kerala, India
- kqk, the ISO 639-3 code for Kotafon language, Benin
