= Alamikkali =

Folk festival of Kerala

Alamikkali is a folk festival that takes place in Mangalore, in the Indian state of Karnataka and some areas of Kasargod in Kerala. This festival shows the religious unity of Hindu and Muslim communities. Alamipalli is located in Kasargod district near Kanhangad.

The festival is a memorial to the Karbala war, an important chapter in Muslim history, as they celebrate Muharram. The same commemoration is imitated during the Alamikkali festival.

== Flame ceremony ==
Under the leadership of Hazrat Imam Hussain Muslims fought against autocratic ruler Yazid. In that war the enemy's army wore black clothing to scare the Hussain army. The alami dress memorializes this. At that time Hussain's army become faint and wandered for water. Yazid's army set a fire around a nearby well. These events were memorialized in Alamikkali. In the final ceremony of Alamikkali it is important to burn the flame and roll in it. This is done to show the respect towards the soldiers who lost their lives on the battlefield.

At the end of the war, Hussain was brutally killed and his body cut into pieces. At the funeral, it was very difficult to bury Hussain's hands. However they tried, it was impossible to cover the hands. At last the enemies covered half and escaped. The main item of Alamikkali, Vellikkaram, arise is in memory of this.

== History ==
The main venue of Alamikkali is at Alamippalli In Kasargod. Other than Alamipalli, celebrations are also conducted in Chithari, Kottikulam and Kasargod, where Muslims families are predominant. The main centre is Alamipally, which has no mosque. They have a rock lined floor in the shape of a flame. The Muslims of Hanefi sect, who speak Hindustani languages organise and lead the ceremony. They are known as Sahibs or Tuluker. Turks went there at the time of Tippu's campaign. They stayed around Puthiyakota (new fort, another place in Kanhangad) and inside fort. The martial arts of Turkey led them to be called sahibs out of respect. When the army occupied these forts, they gave those areas to the Turks who remained. Later the Turks struggled for their livelihood and many of them returned to Turkey. A member from one of the family was the forest guard of the governor landlord in Echikkanam. It is from this family that a series of fakir sahibs, including Rasool Sahib who organised and conducted the last Alamikkali, come from.

== Culture ==
The Alami role is done by those of the Hindu faith, who apply charcoal with white spots all over their bodies. They wear chains with flowers and leaves around their necks and adorn moustaches and beards with fibres of munda (a plant with thorns and leaves used for making mats). They wear dhotis on their knees and a cap of spathe on the head that contain ixora coccinea (main flower used for pooja in Kerala). In villages, alamis used to go in groups and each group contained five or six members.

They move with inflated celebration by making loud sounds using bells and sticks. A wallet is carried along with a deep-bottomed vessel. Alamis never wear shoes. They visit every home asking for alms. After keeping the wallet down they dance in front of every home without giving priority to rhythm. The songs of Alamikkali have a unique tone and verse; "lassolayma... lasso... layma... layma... laymalo..." are the first and last line of every song. Conversations are also structured in the form of songs.
