= Neeleshwaram River =

River in Kerala, India

Neeleshwaram River is one among the 44 rivers flowing through Kerala state. It originates in the Kinanur hills of Hosdurg taluk in the Kasaragod district of Kerala. The 46 km-long river flows through the cultural town of Nileshwaram and finally joins the Tejaswini River or Kariangode River at Kottapuram. The confluence of these two rivers occurs nearby, with the combined flow emptying into the Arabian Sea at Thaikadappuram.

== Tributaries ==
Edathod river and Mayanganam river are the two tributaries of Neeleshwaram river.

== Accidents ==
During the course of the river accidents have taken place. In March 2016, two children who went fishing drowned on the Neeleshwaram downstream near Chalakadav river. In March 2015, a girl died and six others were injured when a car fell into the river near Neeleshwaram.
