= P. V. K. Panayal =

Indian writer and playwright

- പി.വി.കെ. പനയാൽ
- P. V. K. Panayal
- Born: P. V. Kunhikannan; 1949 (age 76–77); Panayal, Kasaragod district, Kerala
- Occupations: Writer, playwright
- Spouse: Savithri
- Children: 2
- Writing career
- Genres: Novel, playwright
- Notable work: Suryapet
- Notable awards: Kerala Sangeetha Nataka Akademi Gurupooja Award, Kerala Sahitya Akademi Award for Overall Contributions

P. V. Kunhikannan who writes under the pen name P. V. K. Panayal is a Malayalam language writer and playwright from Kerala, India.

== Biography ==
P. V. Kunhikannan was born in 1949 in the village of Panayal in Kasaragod district. At the age of 17, he started writing plays for the Thachangad Youth Arts Society. Avasana rangam (Meaning:The last scene), a two-hour long one-act play, was a remarkable breakthrough. Panayal's Cheriya maram valiya maram (Meaning:Small Tree Big Tree) is a play performed in many venues. His novel Suryapet which was written in the context of the Telangana agitation was made into a play by theater group Kannur Sangh Chetana. within one year, that play was performed in 400 stages. AKG, a biography film directed by Shaji N. Karun, was scripted and narrated by Panayal.

He was the Kasargod district president of the Purogamana Kala Sahithya Sangam (Progressive Art Literary Society). Started his official career as a teacher in a government school, he retired as Head Master from Ajanur LP School. He was a member of Kerala Sahitya Akademi, Kerala Sangeetha Nataka Akademi and Kerala Folklore Academy. He currently serves as the executive committee member of the Sahitya Pravarthaka Sahakarana Sangham, Executive Committee member of the granthashala Sangham and the Editor of Granthalokam magazine. Panayal now lives in Karakuzhi, Bellikoth, Kanhangad.

== Family ==
He and his Wife Savitri have two children Santosh and Soumya.

== Notable works ==
- Thalamurakalute bharam (Novel)
- Sooryappett (Novel)
- Khanijam (Novel written in the context of Kayyur uprising)
- Adukkala (novel, ISBN 9789387842380)
- Achan (story collection, ISBN 9780000118974)
- Adithattile aravangal (Short story collection)
- AKG (screenplay, ISBN 9788126201853)

== Awards and honors ==
His novel Thalamurakalute bharam (Generations' Burden) has won the Cherukad Award. His novel Suryapet won the Abu Dhabi Shakti Award. The play Man written and acted by him won the prize for writing at the Samastha Kerala Sahitya Parishad's State Drama Competition. His plays has also received award from the Purogamana Kala Sahitya Sangham. In 2009 he received the Kerala Sahitya Akademi Award for Overall Contributions in the field of Malayalam literature. in 2020 he received Kerala Sangeetha Nataka Akademi Gurupooja award for his outstanding contributions in the field of theatre art.
