= Kilayikode =

- village
- Country: India
- State: Kerala
- District: Kasaragod
- Talukas: Hosdurg

Languages
  - Official: Malayalam, English
- Time zone: UTC+5:30 (IST)
- PIN: 6XXXXX
- Vehicle registration: KL-

Kilayikode is a village in Kasaragod district in the state of Kerala, India.

== Transportation ==
Local roads have access to NH.66 which connects to Mangalore in the north and Calicut in the south. The nearest railway station is Cheruvathur on Mangalore-Palakkad line. There are airports at Mangalore and Calicut.
