= Panayal =

- village
- Location in Kerala, India Panayal (India)
- Coordinates: 12.4356400°N 75.069050°E
- Country: India
- State: Kerala
- District: Kasaragod

Population (2011)
  - Total: 19,186

Languages
  - Official: Malayalam, English
- Time zone: UTC+5:30 (IST)
- PIN: 671318
- Vehicle registration: KL-60

Panayal is a village in Kasaragod district in the state of Kerala, India. It is situated approximately 6 km inland from the coastal town of Bekal. Panayal is 18.3 km by road from Kasaragod and around 14.9 km from Kanhangad. Sri Mahalingeshwara Aided Upper Primary School and the Sri Mahalingeshwara Shiva temple are located here. Panayal is known for the Theyyam art form performed in the many family shrines in the area. Panayal is the birthplace of the writer P. V. K. Panayal.

== Demographics ==
As of 2011, Panayal had a population of 19,186, with 9,053 males and 10,133 females which is 17.8% higher than the previous population of 16276 according to the 2001 census.

== Transportation ==
Local roads have access to NH.66 which connects to Mangalore in the north and Calicut in the south. The nearest railway station is Kotikulam, and the nearest major railway station is Kanhangad, both on the Mangalore-Shoranur line. The nearest airports are at Mangalore, Kannur and Calicut.
