= Kodakkad =

Kodakkad kodakkad
- village
- Location in Kerala, India Kodakkad (India)
- Coordinates: 12.199832°N 75.202438°E
- Country: India
- State: Kerala
- District: Kasaragod

Population (2011)
  - Total: 10,763

Languages
  - Official: Malayalam, English
- Time zone: UTC+5:30 (IST)
- Postal code: 671310
- Vehicle registration: KL-60

Kodakkad is a village in Kasaragod district in the state of Kerala, India.

== Demographics ==
As of 2011 India census, Kodakkad had a population of 10,763, with 5,210 males and 5,553 females.

== Transportation ==
The local roads have access to NH.66 which connects to Mangalore in the north and Calicut in the south. The nearest railway station is Cheruvathur on the Mangalore-Palakkad line. There are airports at Mangalore, Kannur, and Calicut.
