= Bare (Kasaragod) =

Village in Kerala, India

Bare Bara
- Census Town
- Location in Kerala, India
- Coordinates: 12.4479°N 75.0421°E
- Country: India
- State: Kerala
- District: Kasaragod
- Taluk: Hosdurg

Government
  - Body: Udma Grama Panchayat

Area
  - Total: 12.31 km^{2} (4.75 sq mi)

Population (2011)
  - Total: 12,804
  - Density: 1,040/km^{2} (2,694/sq mi)

Languages
  - Official: Malayalam, English
- Time zone: UTC+5:30 (IST)
- PIN: 671318,671319
- Vehicle registration: KL-60

Bare is a census town in Udma Grama Panchayat of Hosdurg taluk in Kasaragod district in Indian state of Kerala.

== Demographics ==
As of 2011 Census, Bare (Mangad) census town had population of 12,804 which constitutes 5,970 males and 6,834 females. Bare town has an area of 12.31 km^{2} (4.75 sq mi) with 2,744 families residing in it. The sex ratio of Bare was 1145 higher than state average of 1084. Population of children in the age group 0-6 was 1,597 (12.5%) where 813 are males and 784 are females. Bare had an overall literacy of 88.4% lower than state average of 94%. The male literacy stands at 92.9% and female literacy was 84.6%.

== Religions ==
As of 2011 Indian census, Bare census town had total population of 12,804б which constitutes 8,327 Hindus (65%), 4,461 Muslims (34.8%) and 0.12% others.

== Administration ==
Bare is part of Udma (State Assembly constituency) under Kasaragod Loksabha.
