= Pallikkara-II =

Village in Kerala, India

- village
- Location in Kerala, India Pallikkara-II (India)
- Coordinates: 12.4201°N 75.0294°E
- Country: India
- State: Kerala
- District: Kasaragod
- Taluk: Hosdurg

Area
  - Total: 6.7 km^{2} (2.6 sq mi)

Population (2011)
  - Total: 16,618
  - Density: 2,500/km^{2} (6,400/sq mi)

Languages
  - Official: Malayalam, English
- Time zone: UTC+5:30 (IST)
- PIN: 671319
- Vehicle registration: KL-60

Pallikkara-II is a village in Hosdurg taluk of Kasaragod district in Kerala, India.

== Demographics ==
At the 2011 census, the village had a population of 16,618 (7,756 males and 8,862 females). It has an area of 6.7 km^{2} (2.6 sq mi) with 3,106 families. The sex ratio of the village was 1,143, higher than state average of 1,084. 12.6% of the population was children aged 0-6 years. The overall literacy of 93.4% was lower than the state average of 94%. The male literacy was 96.4% and female literacy was 90.9%.
