= Sandeep Varier =

Indian politician from Kerala

Sandeep Varier MLA
- സന്ദീപ് വാര്യർ
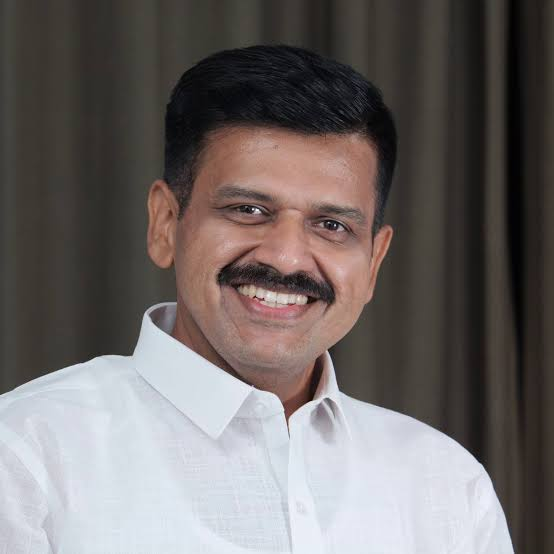

Member of the Kerala Legislative Assembly
- Incumbent
- Assumed office 21 May 2026
- Preceded by: M. Rajagopalan
- Constituency: Thrikaripur

Personal details
- Born: 1982 (age 43–44) Chethallur, Kerala, India
- Party: Indian National Congress (2024– present)
- Other political affiliations: Bharatiya Janata Party (early 2000s– 2024)
- Spouse: Sheeja Sandeep
- Children: 1
- Occupation: Politician, Social Activist

Sandeep Varier (Malayalam: സന്ദീപ് വാര്യർ) (born c. 1982) is an Indian politician from the Indian National Congress and serves as one of the KPCC General Secretaries. He currently serves as the Member of the Legislative Assembly (MLA) representing the Thrikaripur constituency in the Kasaragod district in the 16th Niyamasabha.

== Political career ==
Sandeep Varier began his political career with the Students Federation of India (SFI), in the early 2000s due to the development promises made by L.K Advani he joined the Bharatiya Janata Party (BJP) as a youth leader where he served as a State Spokesperson and was a prominent face in television debates. In late 2024, Varier resigned from the BJP and joined the Indian National Congress, citing ideological differences with the state leadership. Soon after he was made a Spokesperson for the KPCC and currently serves as one of the General Secretaries of the KPCC. He became a prominent and popular leader within the INC.

2021 Assembly Election

While he was still a member of the BJP, the party fielded him in the Shornur Constituency. He notably finished 3rd increasing the vote margin from the previous attempts and only several hundred votes behind the INC candidate.

2021 Kerala Legislative Assembly election: Shornur
Party	Candidate	Votes	%	±%
CPI(M)	P. Mammikutty	74,400	48.98	▲2.27
INC	T. H. Firoz Babu	37,726	24.83	▼4.55
BJP	Sandeep Varier	36,973	24.34	−
SDPI	Muhammad Musthafa	1,251	0.82	▼0.06
BSP	T. C. Ayyappankutty	883	0.58	▲0.04
NOTA	None of the above	678	0.45	−
Margin of victory		36,674	24.15	▲6.82
Turnout		1,51,911	78.31	▲1.68
CPI(M) hold		Swing	▲2.27	

=== 2026 Assembly Election ===
In the 2026 Kerala Legislative Assembly election, the UDF fielded Varier from the Thrikaripur seat. Varier secured a historic victory, defeating his nearest rival, Dr. V. P. P. Mustafa of the CPI(M), by a margin of 4,431 votes.

2026 Kerala Legislative Assembly election: Thrikaripur
Party	Candidate	Votes	%	±%
INC	Sandeep Varier	83,109	48.63	▲11.22
CPI(M)	V. P. P. Mustafa	78,678	46.04	▼7.67
TTP	Ravi Kulangara	7,837	4.59	▼2.24
NOTA	None of the above	710	0.42	−
Independent	Sandeep Elatt	258		−
Independent	Musthafa P. P.	169		−
Independent	Musthafa V. P.	143		−
Margin of victory		4,431	2.59	
Turnout		1,70,904	79.64	
INC gain from CPI(M)		Swing	▲11.22	

== Personal life ==
Varier is a resident of Palakkad but moved his political base to North Malabar following his candidacy in Thrikaripur. According to his electoral affidavit, he is involved in agriculture and social work.
