= Udinoor =

- Village/Graamam
- Location in Kerala, India Udinoor (India)
- Coordinates: 12°15′0″N 75°7′0″E
- Country: India
- State: Kerala
- District: Kasaragod

Population (2011)
  - Total: 11,401

Languages
  - Official: Malayalam, English, Kannadam
- Time zone: UTC+5:30 (IST)
- Vehicle registration: KL-60

Udinoor is a village in Kasaragod district in the state of Kerala, India.

== Etymology ==
The name Udinoor is derived from the name of Udayanan, who was one among the Kolathiris. Udinoor is a part of Allada Swaroopam.

== Temples ==
The famous Kshetrapalaka temple, Udinnor Koolom, is situated in the central part of Udinoor. Lord Kshetrapalaka is considered the landlord of the village. Pattutsavam and Arayalin Kleezhil Ottakolam are the main festivals, occurring yearly in this village.

== Education ==
The main educational institution in Udinoor are Udinoor Central AUPS and GHSS Udinoor.

== Festivals ==
Kinathil Arayalin Keezhil Ottakkolam is famous for the number of people participating. This festival is followed by fireworks. Kinathil is treated as the cultural capital of Udinoor because of the famous Jwala theaters and Samskarika Samithi Vayanasala.

== Demographics ==
As of the 2011 Indian census, Udinoor had a population of 11401 with 5309 males and 6092 females.

== Transportation ==
Local roads have access to NH.66, which connects to Mangalore in the north and Calicut in the south. The nearest railway station is Cheruvathur on the Mangalore-Palakkad line. There are airports at Mangalore and Calicut.
