= Keekan =

- village
- Location in Kerala, India Keekan (India)
- Coordinates: 12°21′0″N 75°3′0″E
- Country: India
- State: Kerala
- District: Kasaragod

Population (2011)
  - Total: 9,735

Languages
  - Official: Malayalam, English
- Time zone: UTC+5:30 (IST)
- Vehicle registration: KL-

Keekan is a village in Kasaragod district in the state of Kerala, India.

== Demographics ==
As of 2011 India census, Keekan had a population of 9,735, with 4,435 males and 5,300 females.

== Transportation ==
The local roads have access to NH.66 which connects to Mangalore in the north and Calicut in the south. The nearest railway station is Kanhangad on the Mangalore-Palakkad line. There are airports at Mangalore and Calicut.
