= Ambalathara, Kasaragod =

Ambalathara
- village
- Location in Kerala, India Ambalathara (India)
- Coordinates: 12°19′0″N 75°7′0″E
- Country: India
- State: Kerala
- District: Kasaragod

Population (2011)
  - Total: 9,120

Languages
  - Official: Malayalam, English
- Time zone: UTC+5:30 (IST)
- Vehicle registration: KL-

Ambalathara is a village in Kasaragod district in the state of Kerala, India.

== Demographics ==
As of 2011 India census, Ambalathara had a population of 9120 with 4268 males and 4852 females.

== Transportation ==
Local roads have access to NH.66, which connects to Mangalore in the north and Calicut in the south. The nearest railway station is Kanhangad on Mangalore-Palakkad line. There are airports at Mangalore and Kannur.
