= Udma =

Udma Ayampara
- Census Town
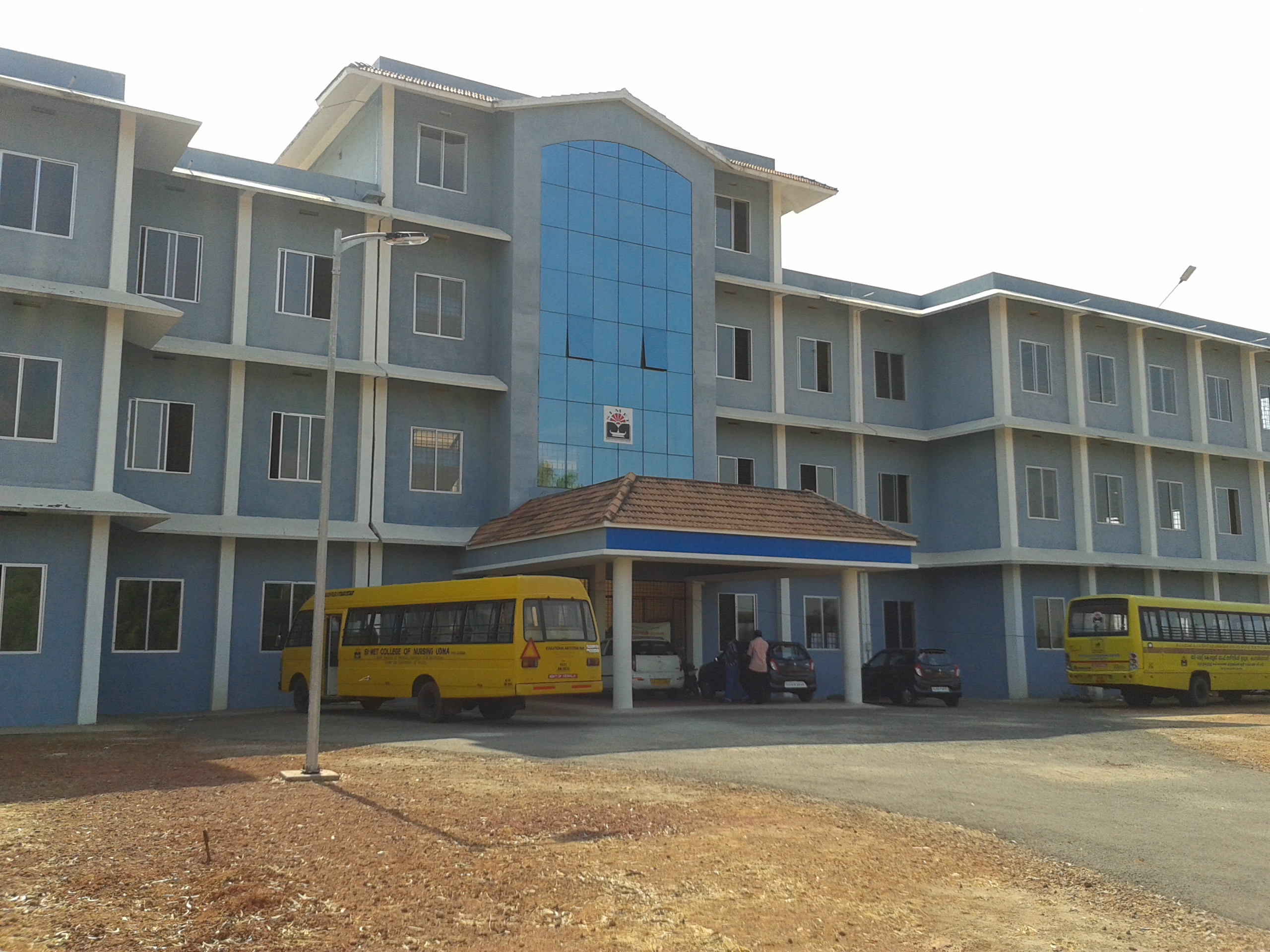
- Nursing College in Udma

- Location in Kerala, India Udma (India)
- Coordinates: 12.444°N 75.024°E
- Country: India
- State: Kerala
- District: Kasaragod

Government
  - Type: Panchayati raj (India)
  - Body: Udma Grama Panchayat

Area
  - Total: 4.53 km^{2} (1.75 sq mi)

Population (2011)
  - Total: 8,115
  - Density: 1,790/km^{2} (4,640/sq mi)

Languages
  - Official: Malayalam, English
- Time zone: UTC+5:30 (IST)

Udma is a census town in Kasaragod district in the Indian state of Kerala.

== Demographics ==
As of 2011 India census, Udma census town had population of 8,115 which constitutes 3,593 males and 4,522 females. Udma census town spreads over an area of 4.53 km^{2} with 1,669 families residing in it. The sex ratio was 1258 higher than state average of 1084. Population of children in the age group 0-6 was 1,072 (13.2%) where 523 are males and 549 females. Udma town had overall literacy of 90.3% lower than state average of 94%. The male literacy stands at 94.8% and female literacy was 86.8%.

Udma Grama Panchayat comprises Udma and Bare census towns and Kottikulam village in its jurisdiction. Uduma Panchayat had total population of 37,537, where 20,919 people live in urban areas and 16,618 live in rural areas.

Social composition in Udma (2011)
Community	Percent
Thiyyar	40.69%
Other Hindu	22.23%
Islam	36.55%
Christianity	0.36%

== Religions ==
As of 2011 India census, Uduma census town had total population of 8,115, among which 5,106 were Hindus (62.9%), 2,966 Muslims (36.5%), 0.36% Christians and 0.2% others.

== Administration ==
- District: Kasaragod
- Taluk/Tehsil: Hosdurg
- Block: Kanhangad
- Assembly Constituency: Udma
- Parliament Constituency: Kasaragod
- Police Station: Bekal
- Post Office: 671 319
- Telephone Exchange: udma. 0467
- Nearest Railway Station: Kottikulam

== Major organizations in Udma ==
- Vivanta Taj Beach Resort
- State Bank of India, Uduma
- Syndicate Bank, Uduma
- Vijaya Bank, Uduma
- Federal Bank, Uduma
- Dhanlaxmi Bank, Uduma
- Indian Overseas Bank, Uduma

== Transportation ==
The local roads have access to NH 66 which connects to Mangalore in the north and Calicut in the south. The nearest railway station is Kottikulam on Shoranur-Mangalore Section under southern railway. There are airports at Mangalore and Calicut.
