= Cheemeni =

- Town
- Location in Kerala, India Cheemeni (India)
- Coordinates: 12.240140°N 75.2318700°E
- Country: India
- State: Kerala
- District: Kasaragod
- Taluk: Hosdurg

Government
  - Type: Panchayati raj (India)
  - Body: Kayyur-Cheemeni Grama Panchayat

Area
  - Total: 36.68 km^{2} (14.16 sq mi)

Population (2011)
  - Total: 8,283
  - Density: 225.8/km^{2} (584.9/sq mi)

Languages
  - Official: Malayalam, English
- Time zone: UTC+5:30 (IST)
- PIN: 671313
- Vehicle registration: KL-60
- Nearest city: Kanhangad
- Lok Sabha constituency: Kasaragod
- Vidhan Sabha constituency: Thrikaripur

Cheemeni is a small town in Hosdurg taluk of Kasaragod district in the state of Kerala, India.

== Demographics ==
As of the 2011 India census, Cheemeni had a population of 8,283 with 3,908 males and 4,375 females.

== Transportation ==
Local roads have access to NH 66 which connects to Mangalore in the north and Kannur in the south. The nearest railway station is Cheruvathur on Mangalore-Palakkad line. There are airports at Mangalore and Kannur.

== Developmental projects ==
=== Cheemeni Power Project ===
A ₹47500 crore 2000-MW coal based super thermal power station, which uses an environment-friendly super critical boiler is planned to be erected at Cheemeni due to increasing power needs of the state. The central government requested for making it gas powered but Kerala government is lobbying for cost effective methods. In 2016 as a first phase a ₹2,050 crore 440-kW station is sanctioned to be built. There are other plans like implementing a 200MW solar park in Kasaragod by Solar Energy Corporation of India (SECI).
