= Nileshwaram =

- Town / Municipality
- Nileshwar / Nileshwaram
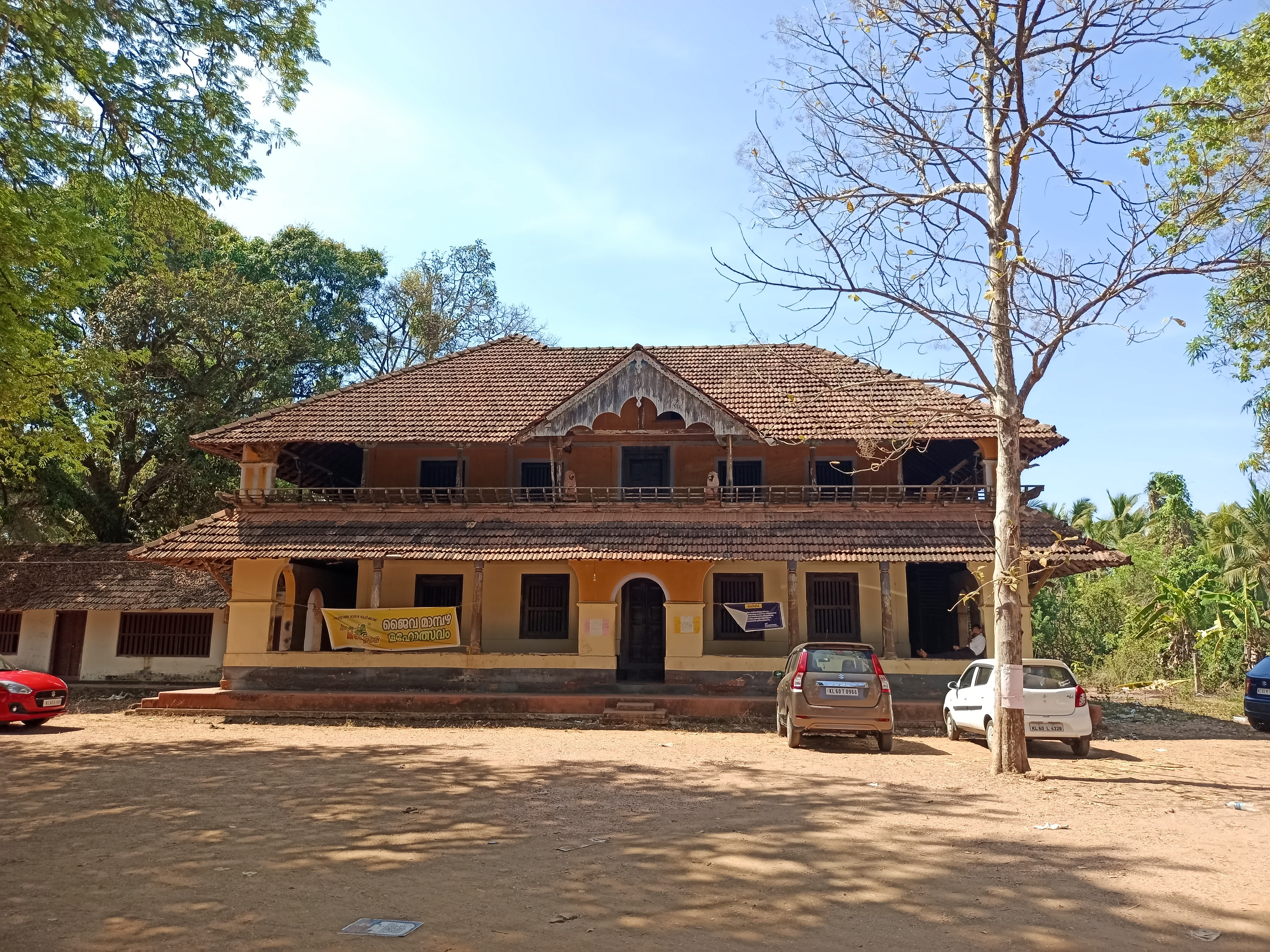
- Nileshwar palace
- Nickname: Cultural capital of Kasargod district
- Location in Kerala, India Nileshwaram (India)
- Coordinates: 12.26°N 75.13°E
- Country: India
- State: Kerala
- District: Kasaragod
- Taluk: Hosdurg

Government
  - Type: Municipality
  - Body: Nileshwar municipality
  - Chairperson: P.P. Muhammad Rafi (CPIM)
  - Vice Chairperson: P.M. Sandhya (CPIM)
  - MLA: Sandeep Varier (INC)

Area
  - Total: 26.23 km^{2} (10.13 sq mi)

Population (2011)
  - Total: 39,752
  - Density: 1,516/km^{2} (3,925/sq mi)

Languages
  - Official: Malayalam
- Time zone: UTC+5:30 (IST)
- PIN: 671314
- Telephone code: 0467
- Vehicle registration: KL-60

Nileshwaram or Nileshwar or Neeleshwaram is a municipality and a major town in Kasaragod District, state of Kerala, India. It is one of the three municipalities in Kasaragod district; the others are Kasaragod and Kanhangad. Nileshwaram is located on the estuary of Kavvayi Backwaters and Neeleshwaram River. Nileshwaram is referred to as the cultural capital of Kasaragod, the northernmost district of Kerala. "The first Chief Minister of Kerala and communist leader E. M. S. Namboodiripad, Kamaran Nair had contested elections to the Assembly from the Neeleshwaram segment."

== History ==
Neeleswaram, or Nileswaram, is the abbreviated form of Neelakanteshweram. The Kolathiri Dominion emerged into independent 10 principalities in the late medieval period, i.e., Kadathanadu (Vadakara), Randathara or Poyanad (Dharmadom), Kottayam (Thalassery), Nileshwaram, Iruvazhinadu (Panoor), Kurumbranad etc., under separate royal chieftains due to the outcome of internal dissensions. Many portions of the present-day Hosdurg taluk (Kanhangad) and Vellarikundu were parts of the Nileshwaram dynasty, who were relatives to both Kolathunadu as well as Zamorin of Calicut, in the early medieval period. Nileshwaram was historically the seat of the Neeleswaram Rajahs, who belonged to the clans of the Kolathiri and Zamorins. The Nileshwar Rajahs and the Bednore Nayaks battled in this area.

The grand finale of the annual temple festival season takes place in this area, which is known for its "kavus", or sacred groves. The most famous of the sacred groves is the Mannampurathu Kavu. The town is also known for Theyyam, the ritualistic art forms. Also Nileshwar is the first town in Kerala famous for cultivating 'Chengthengu' (red dwarf coconut).

In 1918, the Rajah's High School was established, it was one of the first north Kerala schools of its kind. The school retains a letter written to the students by Mahatma Gandhi on his way in 1928 to Mangalore. It was part of a broad appeal for people to rally behind the national movement.

in 2024, 150 people were injured by fireworks at Theru Anjootambalam Veererkavu temple.

== Administration ==
Local bodies in Kasaragod district

Nileshwar municipal town is administered by the Nileshwar Municipality, headed by a chairperson and vice chairperson.

Nileshwar surrounding Panchayats are administered by Nileshwar Block Panchayat. Nileshwaram is politically a part of Thrikaripur Assembly constituency under Kasaragod Loksabha constituency.

=== Municipal Wards ===
Nileshwar Municipality is composed of following 32 wards:

Ward no.	Name	Ward no.	Name
1	Padinhatam kozhuval west	2	Padinhatam kozhuval east
3	Kizhakkan kozhuval	4	Palakkat
5	Chirappuram	6	Pattena
7	Suvarnavally	8	Palathadam
9	Palayi	10	Vallikkunnu
11	Chathamathu	12	Poovalamkai
13	Kunhippulikkal	14	Karyamkode
15	Perole	16	Thattachery
17	Pallikkara I	18	Pallikkara II
19	Karuvachery	20	Koyamburam
21	Anachal	22	Kottappuram
23	Kadinhimoola	24	Purathekai
25	Thaikadappuram south	26	Thaikadappuram centre
27	Thaikadappuram north	28	Thaikadappuram sea road
29	Thaikadappuram store	30	Kotrachal
31	Kanichira	32	Nileshwaram Town

== Religion ==
Most of the people are Hindus, followed by Christians and Muslims. To a lesser extent, there are Jain and Buddhists. The name Nileshwaram is derived from the name of a temple Thaliyil Siva Temple (Neelakanteshwaran), and the culture of the town is based in large part by its temples, like Thaliyil Siva Temple, Mannam Purath Kaavu, Shri Gopalakrishna Temple and Vaikunda Temple.

== Transportation ==
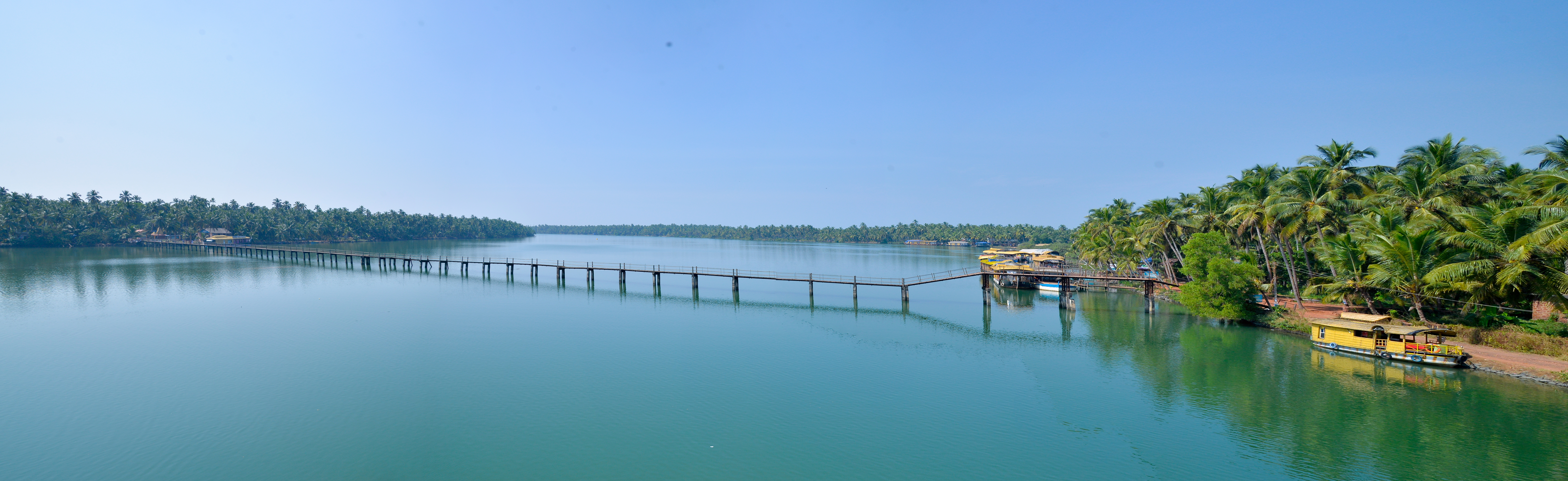
Kottappuram Footbridge, Nileshwar

Nileshwar Town is between Kochi and Panvel on the National Highway 66 ( previously NH-17). Private and KSRTC buses provide routes to many cities like Ernakulam, Calicut, Mangalore, Mysore and Bangalore. There are rail services at Nileshwar railway station. There are airports at Mangalore to the north and Kannur to the south.

== Image Gallery ==
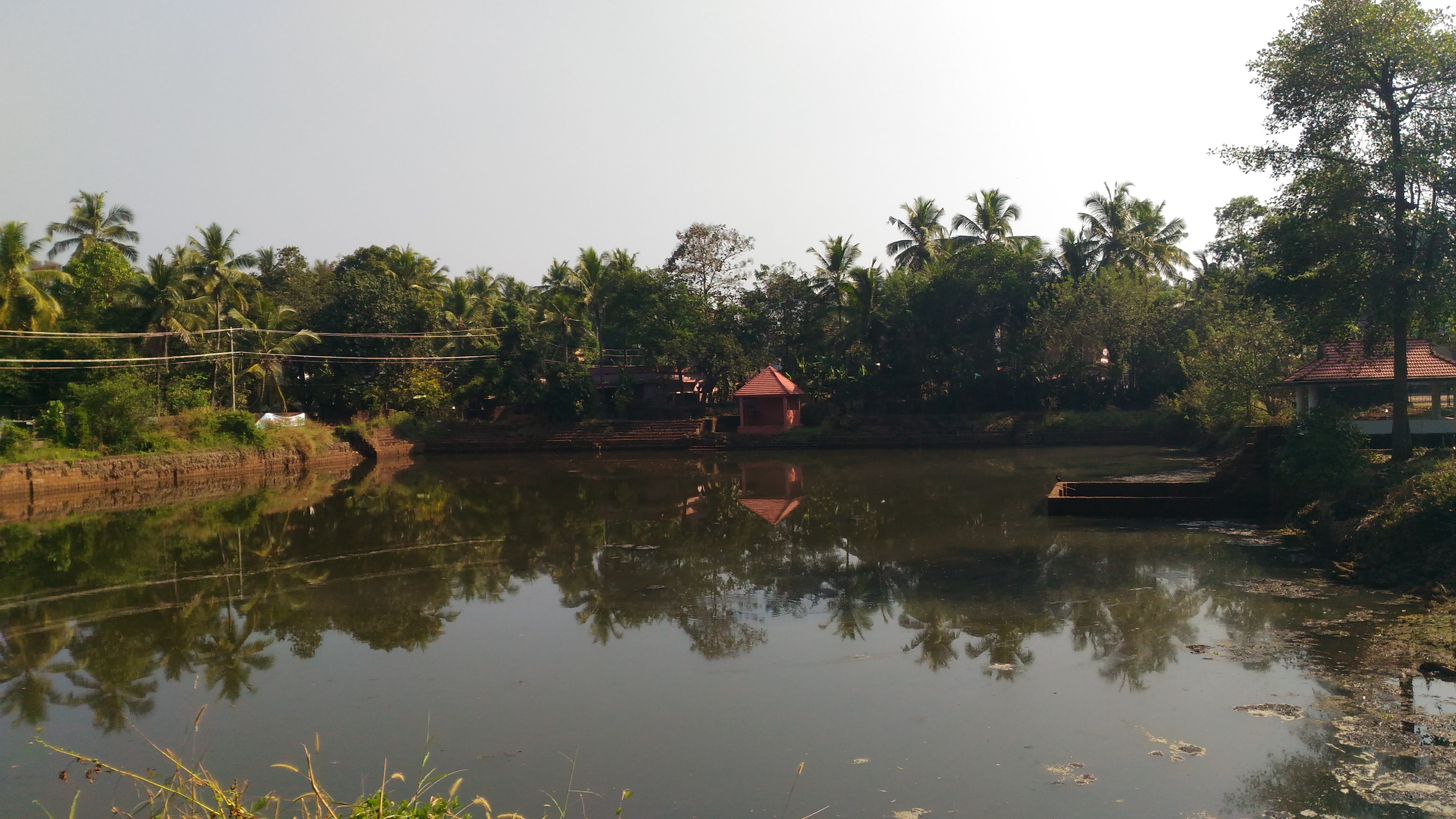
Kovilakam Chira (Pond)

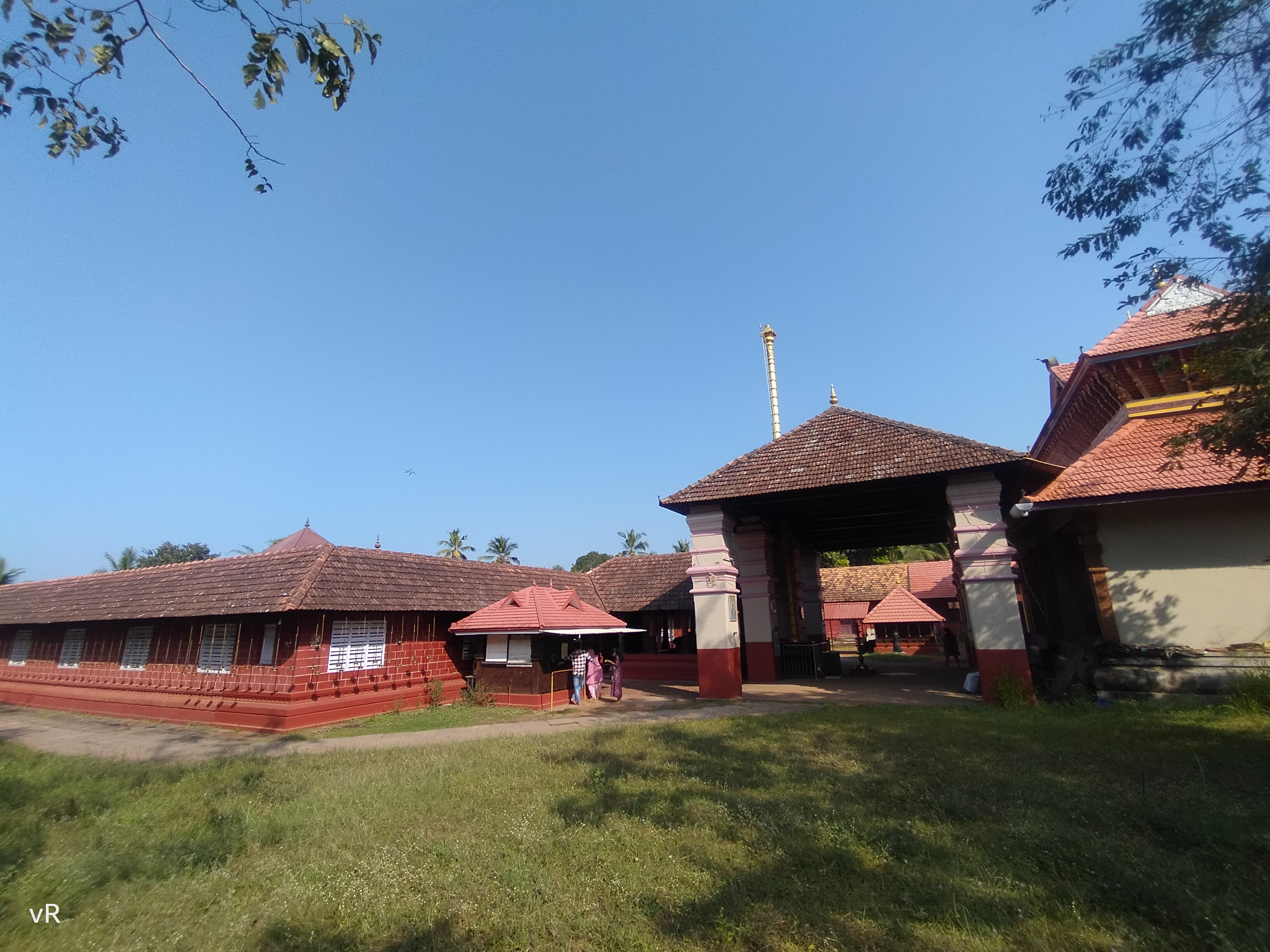
Thali Shiva Temple-Nileshwaram

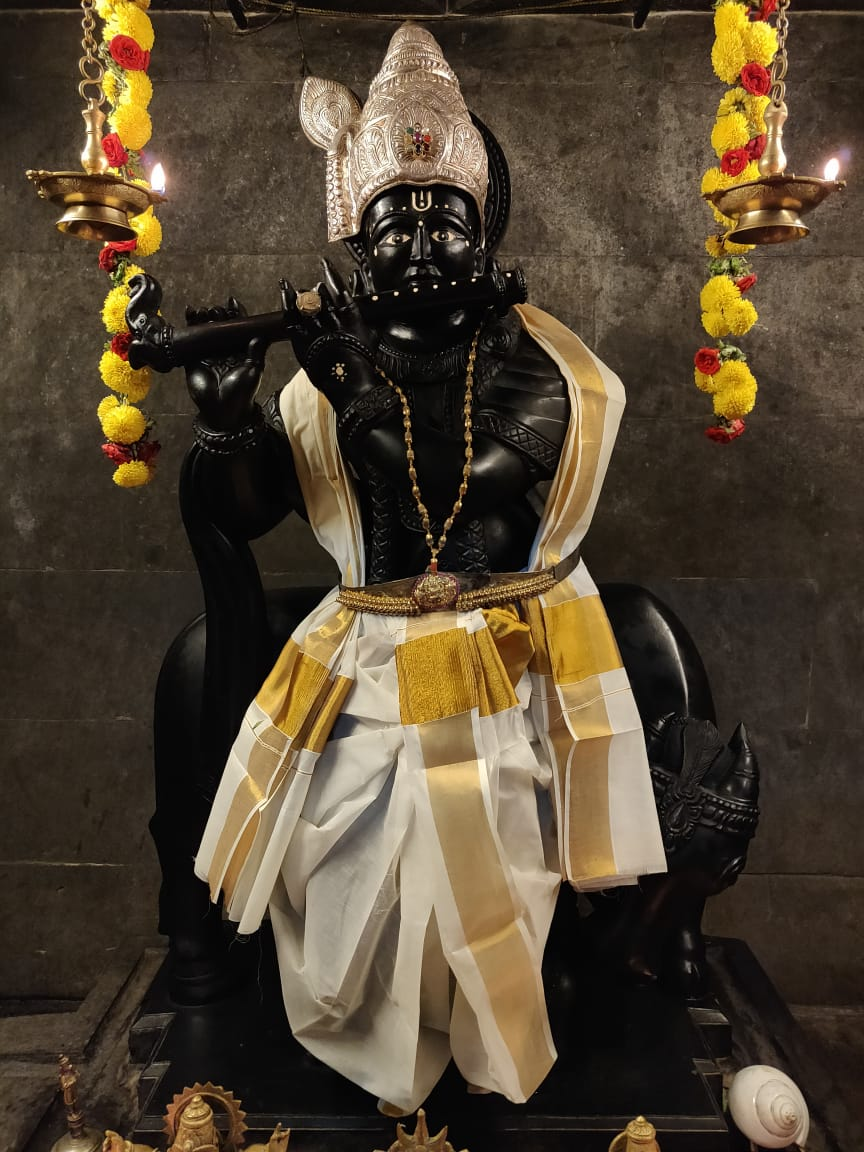
Statue of Shri Gopalakrishna in Nileshwaram

Railway Station Nileshwaram

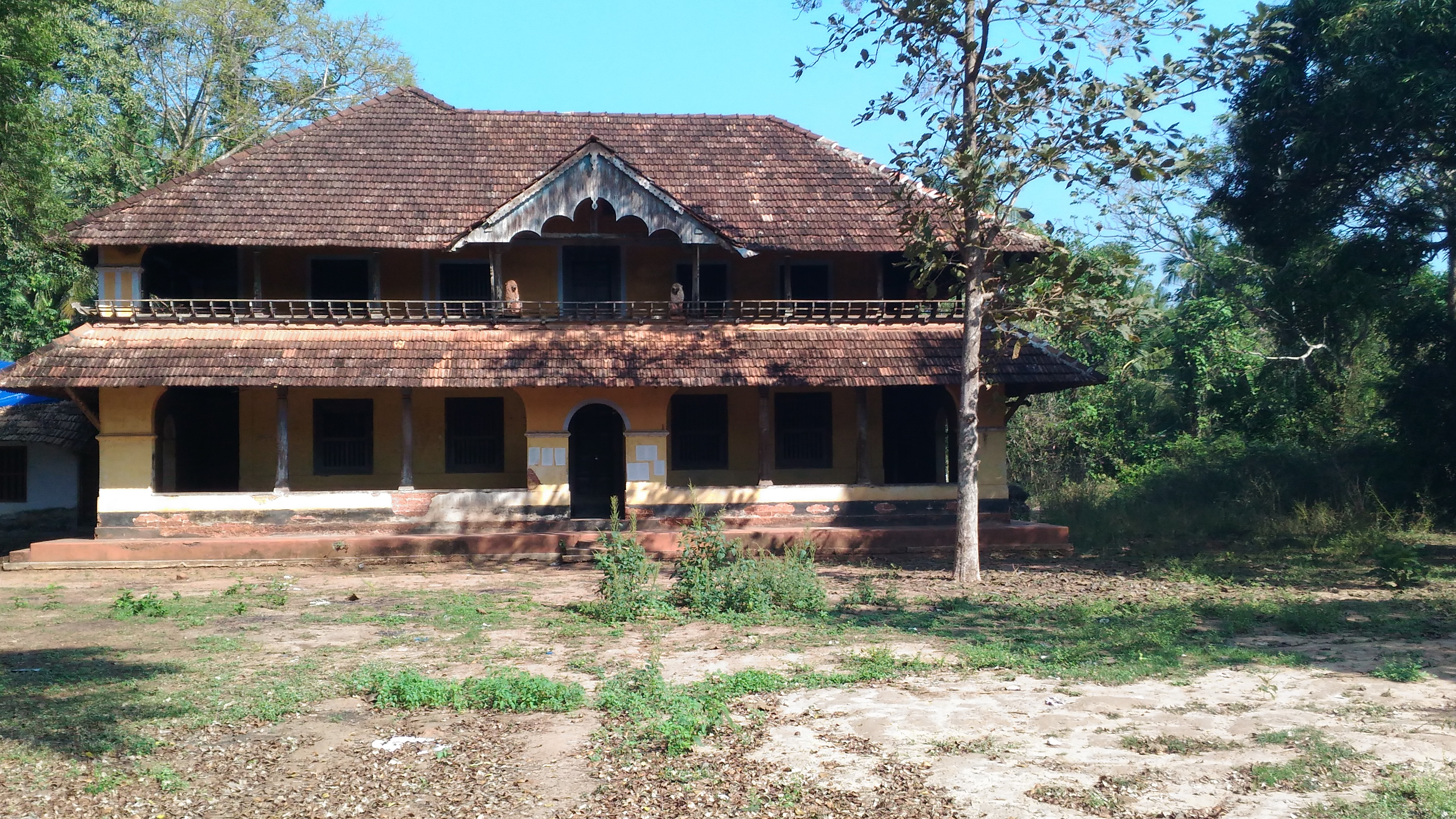
Nileshwaram palace

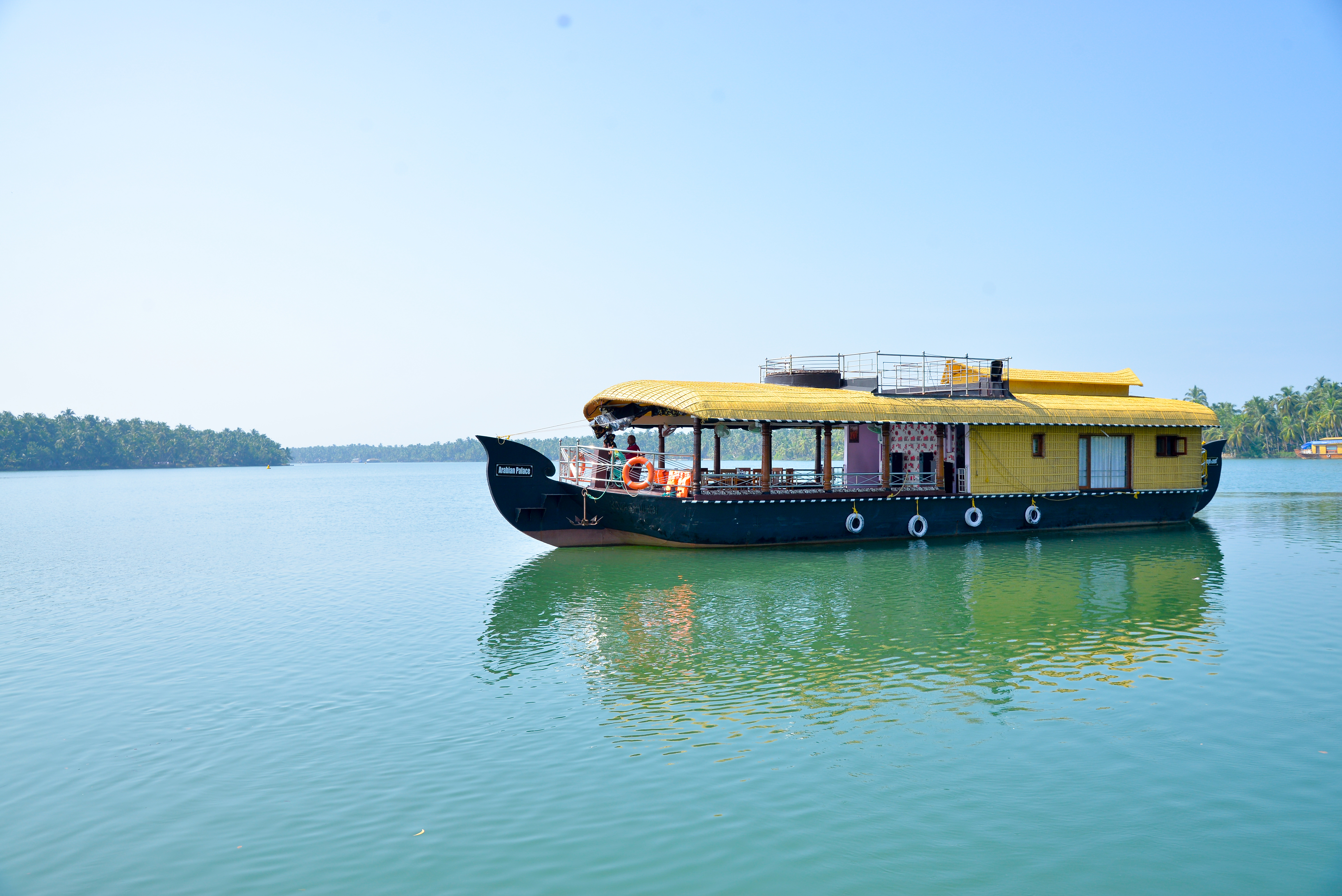
A Kettuvallam in Nileshwaram backwaters

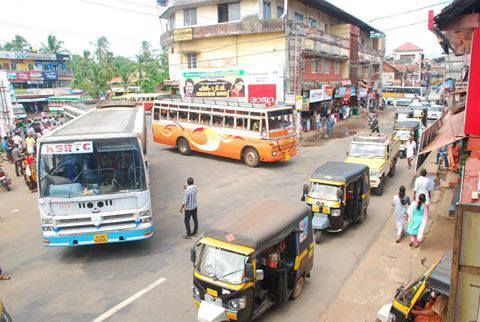
Nileshwaram bus station

== See also ==
- Kanhangad
