= Kotikulam railway station =

Railway station in Kerala, India

Kottikkulam Railway Station
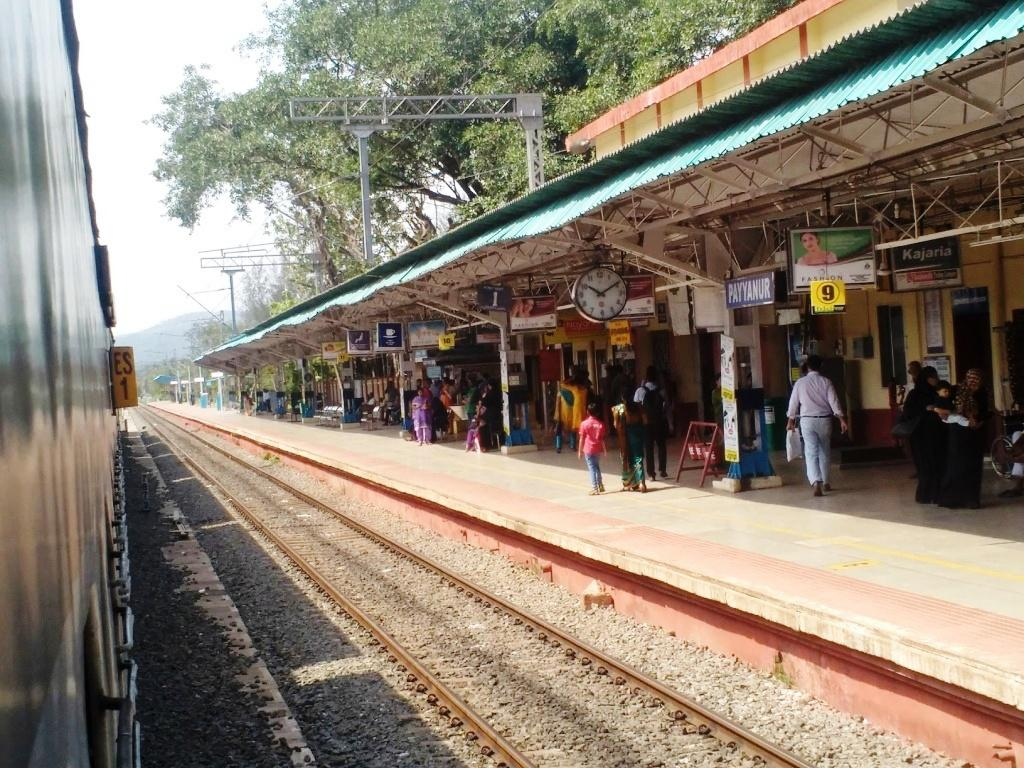

General information
- Location: India
- Coordinates: 12.4237°N 75.0239°E
- System: Express train and Passenger train station
- Platforms: 2
- Tracks: 3

Other information
- Status: Functioning
- Station code: KQK
- Zone(s): Southern Railway zone
- Division(s): Palakkad
Route map
- Sources
Location
- Location within India Location within Kerala

Kottikkulam railway station (station code: KQK) is an NSG–6 category Indian railway station in the Palakkad railway division of the Southern Railway zone. It is a major railway station serving the town of Kottikulam in the Kasaragod District of Kerala, India.

== Line ==
It lies in the Shoranur–Mangalore section of the Southern Railway zone.

== Infrastructure ==
The station has two platforms and three tracks.

== Services ==
Trains from the station connect the town to prominent cities such as Thiruvananthapuram, Kochi, Chennai, Kollam, Kozhikode, Coimbatore and Mangalore.
