= Kayyur =

- village
- Location in Kerala, India Kayyur (India)
- Coordinates: 12.262641°N 75.188907°E
- Country: India
- State: Kerala
- District: Kasaragod

Government
  - Type: Panchayati raj (India)
  - Body: Kayyur-Cheemeni Grama Panchayat

Area
  - Total: 20.55 km^{2} (7.93 sq mi)

Population (2011)
  - Total: 6,450
  - Density: 314/km^{2} (813/sq mi)

Languages
  - Official: Malayalam, English
- Time zone: UTC+5:30 (IST)
- STDCode 0467: 671313
- Vehicle registration: KL-60
- Nearest city: cheemeni

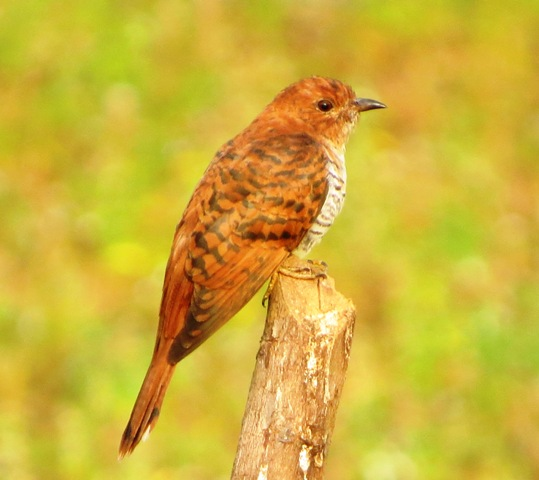
Grey bellied cuckoo spotted in Kayyur

Kayyur is a village in Kasaragod district in the state of Kerala, India. Nearest town is Cheemeni.

== Administration ==
Kayyur is a small village in the Hosdurg taluk.

== Kayyur Incident ==
In 1940, peasants there under the leadership of communists rose against the two local jenmis, Nambiar of Kalliat and the Nayanar of Karakkatt Edam. Several people were killed and four communist leaders were found guilty and hanged by the government,(Madathil Appu, Podavara Kunhambu Nair, Koithattil Chirukandan and Pallickal Abu Bakr)being the guilty. A fifth instigator (Choorikadan Krishnan Nair) was sentenced to life imprisonment and spared from the death penalty, since he was under the age of criminal liability.

Kannada writer Niranjana's work Chirasmarane is based on the Kayyur revolt.

== Village of Rebels ==
Kayyur has developed a reputation for being a village of rebel over a period of history. The first communist rebellion happened in Kayyur and several revolts followed suit. Madathil Appu was hanged by the British in 1943. Kayyur is considered the cradle of agrarian revolution in Kerala. The people of this village have an anti-feudal attitude. The place is located near Cheruvathur.

== Demographics ==
As of 2011 India census, Kayyur had a population of 6,450 with 3,084 males and 3,366 females. Kayyur village has an area of 20.55 km^{2} with 1,788 families residing in it. The sex ratio of Kayyur was 1,091 higher than state average of 1,084. In Kayyur, population of children under 6 years was 8.3%. Kayyur had overall literacy of 91.1% lower than state average of 94%.

== Transportation ==
Local roads have access to NH 66 which connects to Mangalore in the north and Kannur in the south. The nearest railway station is Cheruvathur on Mangalore-Palakkad line. There are airports at Mangalore and Kannur International Airport
