= Cheruvathur =

- Town
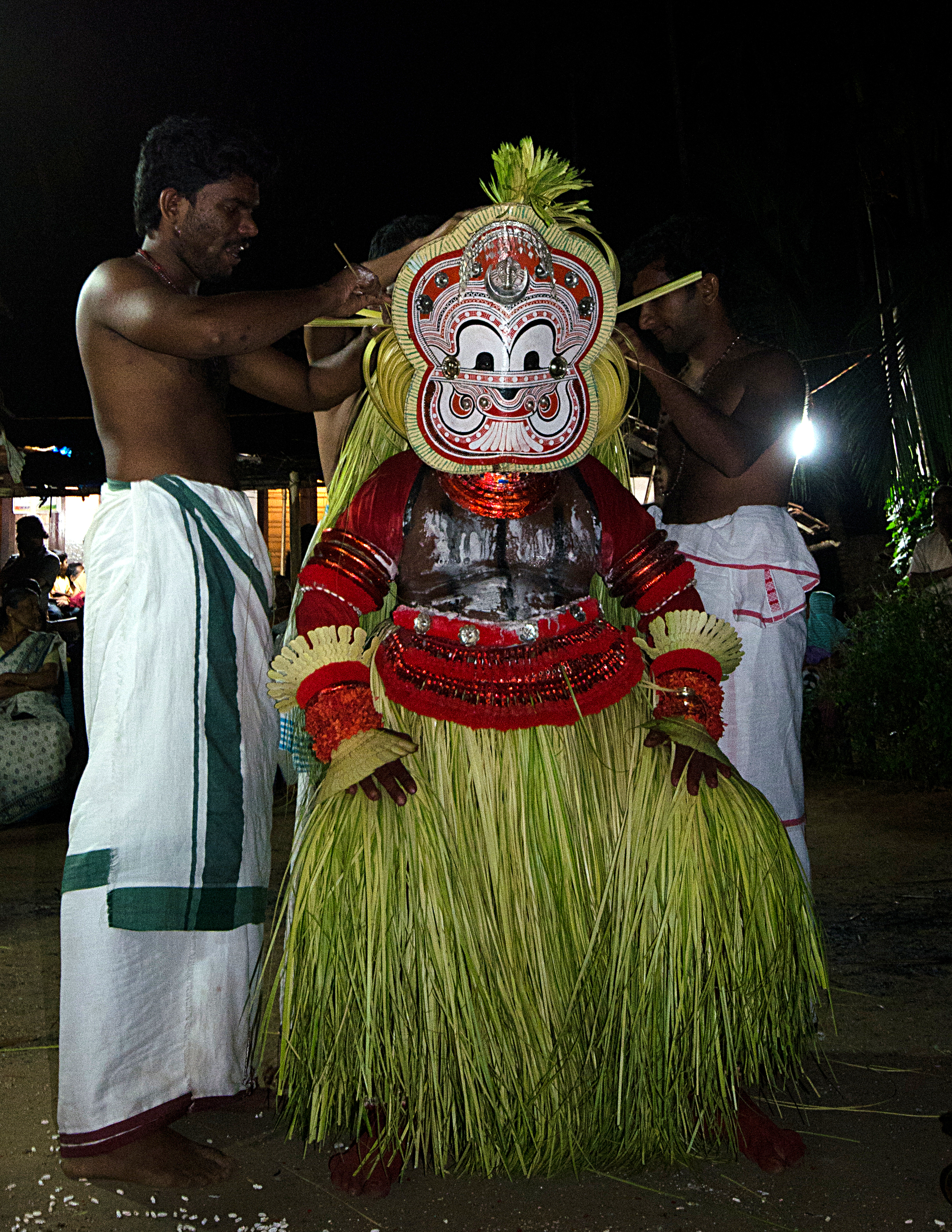
- Pottan Theyyam at Cheruvathur

- Location in Kerala
- Coordinates: 12.2155977°N 75.1624288°E
- Country: India
- State: Kerala
- District: Kasaragod

Government
  - Body: Cheruvathur Grama Panchayat

Area
  - Total: 18.37 km^{2} (7.09 sq mi)

Population (2011)
  - Total: 27,435
  - Density: 1,493/km^{2} (3,868/sq mi)

Languages
  - Official: Malayalam, English
- Time zone: UTC+5:30 (IST)
- PIN: 671313

Cheruvathur is a town and grama panchayat in the Kasaragod district, state of Kerala. It is located 41 km (25 mi) from the district headquarters Kasaragod.

== Transportation ==
Local roads have access to NH-66 which connects to Mangaluru in the north and Kannur in the south. The nearest railway station is Cheruvathur on Mangaluru-Palakkad line. There are airports at Mangalore International Airport and Kannur International Airport.
