= Cheruvathur railway station =

Railway station in Kerala, India

Cheruvathur

General information
- Location: Cheruvathur, Kasaragod, Kerala; India
- Coordinates: 12.214579°N 75.154773°E
- System: Regional rail, Light rail & Commuter rail station
- Owner: Indian Railways
- Operator: Southern Railway zone
- Line: Shoranur–Mangalore line
- Platforms: 3
- Tracks: 4

Construction
- Structure type: At–grade
- Parking: Available

Other information
- Status: Functioning
- Station code: CHV
- Zone(s): Southern Railway zone
- Division(s): Palakkad
- Fare zone: Indian Railways

History
- Opened: 1904; 122 years ago
Location
- Location within India Location within Kerala

Cheruvathur railway station is a railway station in Kasaragod District, Kerala. It falls under the Palakkad railway division of the Southern Railway zone, Indian Railways. The station code is CHV.

In March 2026, some development activities were taken up at the station.

== Important trains originating from Cheruvathur railway station ==
The following trains starting or ending at Cheruvathur railway station:

| Train name | Notes |
|---|---|
| Kannur-Cheruvathur Passenger | Destination Only |
| Charvathur-Mangalore Central Passenger | Origination Only |
