= State Highway 56 (Kerala) =

Highway in Kerala, India

State Highway 56
- Kanhangad – Panathoor Road
- SH 56 highlighted in red

Route information
- Maintained by Kerala Public Works Department
- Length: 44.1 km (27.4 mi)

Major junctions
- West end: SH 57 in Kanhangad
- NH 66 in Mavungal; SH 59 in Pathinettam Mile
- East end: Karnataka border in Chemperi

Location
- Country: India
- State: Kerala
- Districts: Kasaragod

Highway system
- Roads in India; Expressways; National; State; Asian; State Highways in Kerala
← SH 55	→ SH 57

State Highway 56 (SH 56) is a state highway in Kerala, India that starts in Kanhangad and ends in Chemberi. The highway is 44.1 km long.

== Route map ==
Kanhangad – Eriya – Poodamkallu – Rajapuram – Kolichal - Panathoor - Chemberi

== See also ==
- Roads in Kerala
- List of state highways in Kerala
