= The Vision (magazine) =

Indian spiritual magazine

The Vision is a monthly magazine published by the spiritual center Anandashram, in Kanhangad, India.

== History and profile ==
The Vision was founded by Swami Ramdas in 1933. The first issue appeared in October 1933. The magazine is circulated monthly. It publishes his teachings, as well as those of his center co-founders Mother Krishnabai, Swami Satchidananda, and other Indian spiritual teachers.
