= Kolavayal =

Kolavayal കൊളവയല്‍
- Village
- Kolavayal
- Nickname: Kolavayal
- Location within Kerala
- Coordinates: 12.332649°N 75.074256°E
- Country: India
- State: Kerala
- Region: Ajanur
- [[List of districts of India|Distri: Kasargod

Area
  - Total: 2.5 km^{2} (0.97 sq mi)

Population (2011)
  - Total: 10,000 approx.

Languages
  - Official: Malayalam
- Time zone: UTC+5:30 (IST)
- PIN: 671531
- Area code: 04672
- Vehicle registration: KL-60

Kolavayal is a place in Ajanur village in Kanhangad town, Kasargod district, Kerala, India. It is a good place.

== Constituent villages ==
The area consist of villages Ittammal, Main Kolavayal, Thayal Kolavayal, Vivekananda Nagar, Muttumthala, Ajanur Beach & Athinjal, north kolavayal There are many mosques and temples in these areas.

== Education ==
The schools in this area are Iqbal Higher Secondary School, alp school muttumthala, GFUPS Ajanur, Sree Kurumba School, Crescent English Medium School and kolavayal Vivekananda Vidyalayam.

== Postal Service ==
The Kolavayal Post Office is located at Main Kolavayal which is the post office for Kolavayal and nearby areas.

== Economy ==
Many of the people have migrated to Gulf for their livelihood.

== Transportation ==
Local roads have access to NH.66 which connects to Mangalore in the north and Calicut in the south. The nearest railway station is Kanhangad on Mangalore-Palakkad line. The nearby airports are Mangalore Airport, Kannur Airport and Calicut Airport.
