= Arangadi =

- village
- Location in Kerala, India Arangadi (India)
- Coordinates: 12°10′0″N 75°12′0″E
- Country: India
- State: Kerala
- District: Kasaragod

Languages
  - Official: Malayalam, English
- Time zone: UTC+5:30 (IST)
- PIN: 671315
- Telephone code: 467
- Vehicle registration: KL-60
- Nearest city: kanhangad
- Lok Sabha constituency: kasaragod

Arangadi is a village in the kanhangad municipality of the Kasaragod district in the Indian state of Kerala. Arangadi is also known as Sithasook. It is 3 km far from Kanhangad town .

== Economy ==
The economy depends on the inflow of money from locals employed as migrant workers in the Persian Gulf countries such as UAE, Kuwait, Qatar, Bahrain and Saudi Arabia. Arangadi is a stronghold for IUML (Indian union Muslim league)

== Education ==
kareemul islamiya alp school and Noorul hudha madrasa and a pri primary school are situated in this area

== Religions ==
Islam and Hinduism are the major religions in this area. One the oldest masjid of Kanhangad is Arangadi parambath juma masjid and famous kuthirakkali bagavathi temple nilangara are the main religions places in this area.

== Climate ==
The southwest monsoon starts towards the end of May, or the beginning of June, heralded by thunderstorms, and lasts till September. October brings in the northeast monsoon. Dry weather sets in by the end of December. January and February are the coolest months of the year. March, April and May are very hot.

== Rivers ==
The Arayi River originates from the Madikai Panchayat, and passes south through Arangadi and drains to the Nileshwar River.

== Transportation ==
Local roads have access to NH.66 which connects to Mangalore in the north and Calicut in the south. The nearest railway station is Kanhangad on Mangalore-Palakkad line. There are airports at Mangalore and Calicut.
