= Municipal council (India) =

Local government body in smaller urban areas of India

In India, a municipal council, also known as municipality, nagar palika, nagar palika parishad, nagar parisad or nagar sabha, is a self-governing Urban Local Body that administers a smaller urban areas than municipal corporations, with population of 100,000 or more. It interacts directly with the state government, though it is administratively part of the district it is located in. Generally, smaller district cities and bigger towns have a Municipal Council.

The specific powers, functions, and composition of Municipal Councils can vary across different states in India, as they are governed by the respective state governments through their municipal acts or legislation.

Nagar Palikas are also a form of local self-government entrusted with some duties and responsibilities, as enshrined in the Constitutional (74th Amendment) Act, 1993. Under Article 243Q, it became obligatory for every state to constitute such units.

The 74th amendment made the provisions relating to urban local governments (nagar palikas).

Single tier structure:

- Municipal Corporation
- Municipal Council
- Nagar panchayat/Town Board/Town Panchayat

== Composition ==
The members of the Municipal Council or Municipality are elected representatives for a term of five years. The town is divided into wards according to population, and representatives are elected from each ward separately. The members elect a chairperson and vice chairperson among themselves to preside over and conduct meetings. A chief executive officer, along with officers like an engineer, sanitary inspector, health inspector, and education officer who come from the state public service are appointed by the state government to control the administrative affairs of the Nagar Palika. Employees of the state government of India, including Chief Officer, Town Planning Engineer, Auditor, Sanitary Inspector, Medical Officer for Health, and Education Officer, among many others, who come from the state public services, are appointed to handle the administrative affairs of the Municipality.

Organisational hierarchy

Republic of India
States	Union Territories
Divisions
Districts
Blocks (Tehsils/Talukas)	Municipal Corporations (Mahanagar Palika)	Municipal Council (Nagar-Palika)	Town Board (Nagar-Panchayat)
Villages (Gram/Gaon)	Wards

== Requirements ==
The population requirements for forming a Municipal Council or Municipality vary across different states in India. The specific population thresholds are defined by the respective state governments through their municipal acts or legislation. In Andhra Pradesh, a Municipality can be formed if the population of the area is more than 25000 and below 100000. The population requirement for a municipality to be classified as a Municipal Council can vary from state to state but typically ranges from around 20,000 to 100,000 residents. Again, the exact population requirement may vary depending on the state. The establishment of municipalities is primarily based on several factors that are taken into consideration by the state governments. These factors may vary from state to state but generally include the following:

- Population
- Geographical area
- Urbanization
- Revenue
- Infrastructure

== Functions ==
The Municipality is responsible for:

- Water supply
- Hospitals (Excluding district hospitals, regional speciality hospitals)
- Roads (Excluding major district roads)
- Street lighting
- Drainage
- Fire brigade
- Market places
- Government schools
- Sewage treatment
- Veterinary clinics
- Agriculture
- Public health care
- Public amenities
- Social forestry
- Social welfare
- Infrastructure development
- Urban planning
- Records of births and deaths
- Sports and recreational facilities
- Sanitation
- Solid waste management
- Maintaining gardens, parks and playgrounds
- Providing education to unprivileged children
- issuance of trade certificate, birth and death certificate, building permit, occupancy certificate, etc.

== Sources of income ==
A steady and adequate supply of funds is essential for the smooth running of all these programmes. The various sources of income of municipal bodies are:

- The income from taxes, including on houses, entertainment, electricity, water tax (in certain cities), vehicles, property, and land
- Toll tax is the most important income of a municipality. All commercial vehicles may receive toll taxes, except auto rickshaw.
- Income is also generated from commercial activities like hotels, tourist centers, renting and sale of municipal property, and education cess.
- Financial grants from the state government are a major source of income for all municipal bodies. Loans are also provided if special projects are undertaken for citizens' welfare.
- Professional tax collection from all the employers, i.e. government and private sectors

== See also ==
- Municipal governance in India

== Sources ==
- Our Civic Life (Civics and Administration) - Maharashtra State Bureau of Textbook Production and Curriculum Research, Pune
