= Kanhangad south =

Village in Kerala, India

Kanhangad south is a village in Kanhangad municipality in Kasargod district in the Indian state of Kerala. It has a low population and the river Arayi flows near to this beautiful place.

== Climate ==
The southwest monsoon starts towards the end of May, or the beginning of June, heralded by thunderstorms, and lasts till September. October brings in the northeast monsoon. Dry weather sets in by the end of December. January and February are the coolest months of the year. March, April and May are very hot.

== Rivers ==
The Arayi River originates from the Madikai Panchayat and passes south through Arangadi and drains to the Nileshwar River.

== Attractions ==
- Hosdurg Fort: A historical fort located in the region.
- Sree Madiyan Koolam Temple: A significant religious site in the area.
- Nityananda Ashram: An ashram situated on a hillock south of Hosdurg in Kanhangad, built by Swami Nityananda.
- Manjapothi Hills: A scenic hill area offering natural beauty.
- Gandhi Smrithi Mandapam: A memorial dedicated to Mahatma Gandhi.

These attractions contribute to the cultural and natural appeal of Kanhangad South and its surrounding areas.

== Transportation ==
Local roads have access to NH.66 which connects to Mangalore in the north and Calicut in the south. The nearest railway station is Kanhangad on Mangalore-Palakkad line. There are airports at Mangalore, Kannur International Airport and Calicut.
