= Manikoth =

- Town
- Interactive map of Manikoth
- Coordinates: 12°20′41.6″N 75°04′40.5″E

Government
  - Type: Local self-government
- Time zone: IST
- Postal code: 671531
- Vehicle registration: KL

Manikoth is a small town situated near Kanhangad in Kasaragod district, Kerala, India. It has many importances such as it is a place of religious co-operation. It is the place of famous mosque Khazi Hassainar Juma Masjid and Sri Madiyan Koolam Temple.

== Manikoth Juma Masjid ==
Manikoth Juma Masjid is a famous mosque in the Kasaragode District. It is situated in the heart-part of the Manikoth town. The yearly conducting Uroos in this mosque is very all over the state. Thousands of people gather here in the season of the festival. The festival is conducted here during January–February months of every year. The festival is conducting in the memory of Khazi Hassainar.

== Transportation ==
Local roads have access to NH. 66 which connects to Mangalore in the north and Kannur in the south. The nearest railway station is Kanhangad on Mangalore-Palakkad line. There are airports at Mangalore and Kannur.
