= Ajanur =

Ajanoor Ajanur
- Census Town
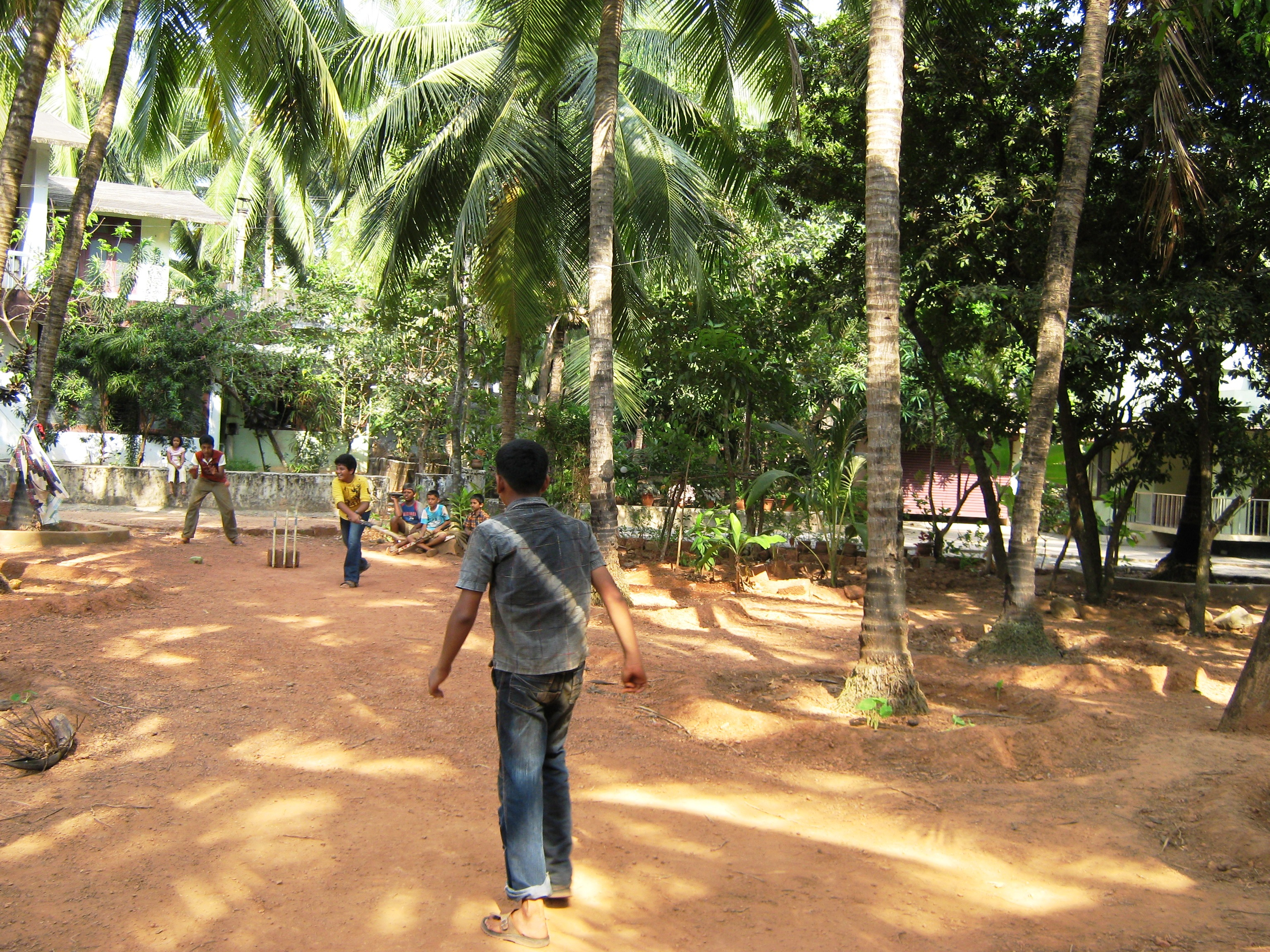
- Beach Road, Kanhangad

- Location in Kerala, India Ajanoor (India)
- Coordinates: 12°20′24″N 75°5′24″E
- Country: India
- State: Kerala
- District: Kasargode

Government
  - Type: Panchayat raj
  - Body: Ajanur Grama Panchayat

Area
  - Total: 14.79 km^{2} (5.71 sq mi)

Population (2011)
  - Total: 33,079
  - Density: 2,237/km^{2} (5,793/sq mi)

Languages
  - Official: Malayalam, English
- Time zone: UTC+5:30 (IST)
- PIN: 671 531
- Telephone code: 91 467
- Vehicle registration: KL-60
- Website: kasaragod.nic.in

Ajanur (also anglicized Ajanoor) is a census town and grama panchayat in Kasaragod district of Kerala, India. It is also a suburb of Kanhangad city.

== Administration ==
Ajanur census town fall under the administrative jurisdiction of Ajanur Grama Panchayat. The area functions as a suburb of Kanhangad city. Ajanur is just 2 km (1.2 mi) north of Kanhangad, stretching along the State Highway 57.

== Demographics ==
As of the 2011 census of India, Ajanur had a population of 33,079 of which 15,364 are males while 17,715 are females. The child population in the age group 0–6 years is 4,122, which constitutes 12.46% of the total population.

Ajanur has a female sex ratio of 1,153 against the state average of 1,084. The child sex ratio is 994, compared to the Kerala average of 964. The literacy rate of Ajanur is 89.07%, lower than the state average of 94.00%. Male literacy is 93.67% and female literacy is 85.16%.

== Wards in the local administration ==
Ajanur panchayat consists of the following 23 villages or "wards":

ward	name	location	population
1	Ravaneshwaram	12.374°N 75.080°E	2,546
2	Ramagiri		2,377
3	Velashwaram	12.354°N 75.086°E	2,356
4	Madiyan	12.353°N 75.078°E	2,678
5	Manikoth		1,775
6	Adot		1,908
7	Bellikoth	12.339°N 75.089°E	2,326
8	Kattukulangara		2,190
9	Mavungal	12.340°N 75.104°E	2,188
10	Ramnagar		2,128
11	Pallot		1,868
12	Kizhakkumkara	12.331°N 75.092°E	2,080
13	Thulichery		2,204
14	Athinal		2,634
15	Ittammal		3,010
16	Kolavayal	12.335°N 75.073°E	3,015
17	Ajanur Beach (Ajanur Kadappuram)	12.333°N 75.067°E	3,370
18	Muttumthala		3,200
19	Mattummal		3,405
20	Mallikamad		2,933
21	Chithari / Chittari	12.357°N 75.065°E	
22	Barikkad		
23	Mukkoodu		

== Notable people ==
Ajanur is the birthplace of the poet P. Kunhiraman Nair, whose younger brother P. Krishnan Nair, was the first president of the panchayat.

Ajanur was also home for the socialist party leader C. M. Padmanabhan Nair.

== Temples ==
The Madiyan Koolom temple is situated in Ajanur (12.352°N 75.081°E). The main deity of the temple is Bhadrakali.

== Education ==
Educational institutions in Ajanur are Govt. Higher Secondary School, Ravaneshwaram, Maha Kavi P. Kunhiraman Nair Memorial High School, Iqbal High School and Crescent English Medium School.

== Transportation ==
Local roads have access to NH.66 which connects to Mangalore in the north and Calicut in the south. The nearest railway station is Kanhangad on Mangalore-Palakkad line. There are airports at Mangalore and Calicut.
