= Subodh Raghunath Shenoy =

Indian condensed matter physicist

- Born: 16 October 1947 (age 78); India
- Known for: Studies on phase transitions and vortex dynamics
- Awards: 1992 Shanti Swarup Bhatnagar Prize
- Scientific career
- Fields: Condensed Matter Physics; Statistical Physics
- Workplaces: Tata Institute of Fundamental Research; IISER Thiruvananthapuram

Subodh Raghunath Shenoy (born 16 October 1947) is an Indian condensed matter physicist and a former professor at the Tata Institute of Fundamental Research. He has also been associated with the Indian Institute of Science Education and Research, Thiruvananthapuram. Known for his studies on Condensed matter physics and Statistical physics, his research covered topological defect-mediated phase transitions, vortex dynamics and decay kinetics of metastability.

Shenoy is an elected fellow of the Indian Academy of Sciences. The Council of Scientific and Industrial Research, the apex agency of the Government of India for scientific research, awarded him the Shanti Swarup Bhatnagar Prize for Science and Technology, one of the highest Indian science awards, for his contributions to physical sciences in 1992. (Note: Long link - please select award year to see details)

His father, Bellikoth Raghunath Shenoy and his sister Sudha Shenoy were noted economists.

== See also ==
- Condensed matter theory
