= Hosdurg Fort =

Fort in Kanhangad, Kerala, India

Coordinates: 12°18′33″N 75°05′38″E

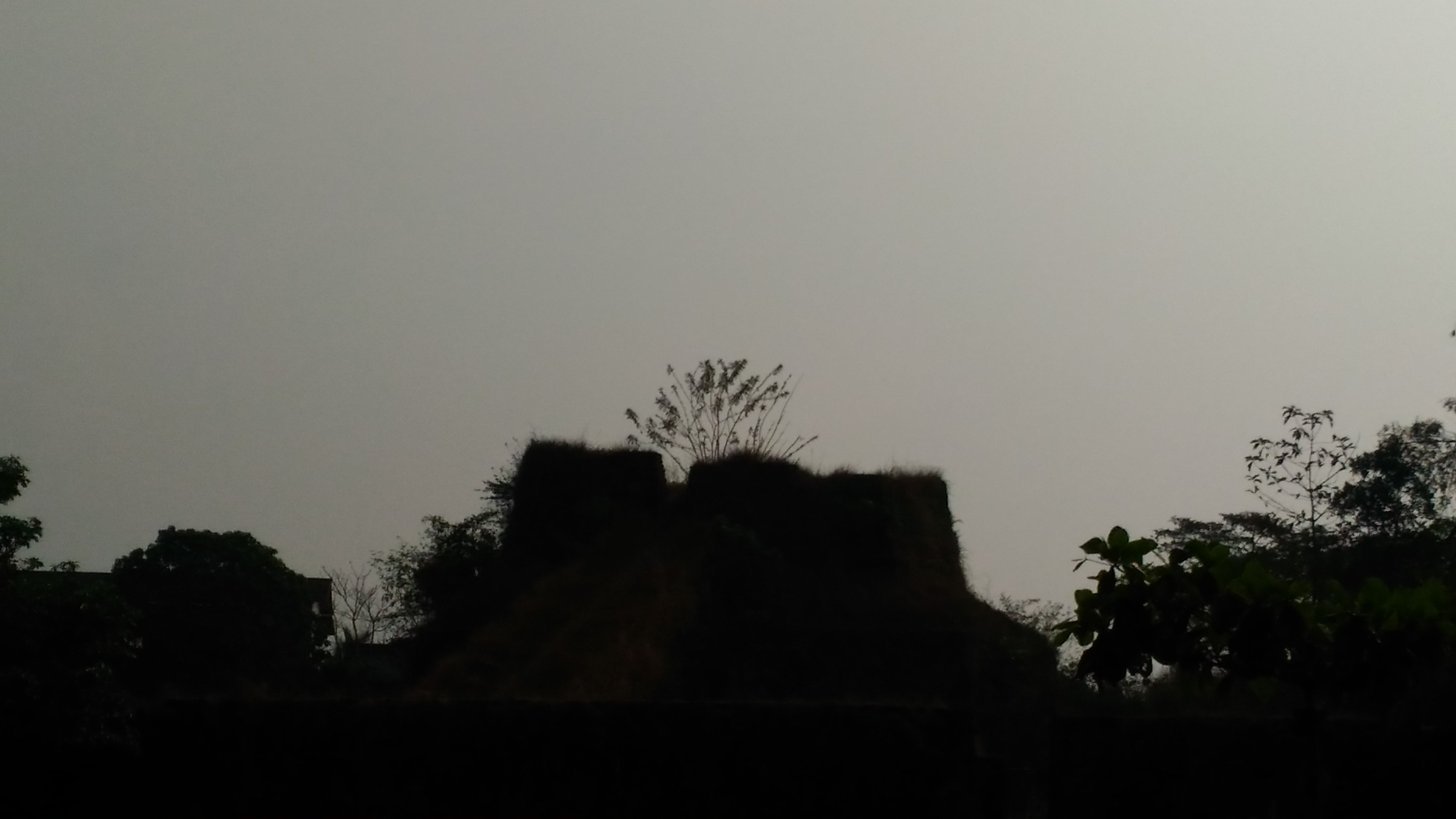
Hosdurg Fort

Hosdurg Fort or Hosadurga Fort (transl. New fort), also known as Kanhangad Fort, is a fort in Kanhangad in Kasaragod district of Kerala, India. Somashekara Nayaka of the Keladi Nayaka dynasty of Ikkeri built the fort.

The place is made well known by the Nithyanandasram with 45 caves. To the south-west of the fort is a temple that was also built by the Nayaks. The temple, dedicated to Shiva, is named the Poonkavanam Karpooreswara Temple.

== History ==
Hosdurg Fort was constructed in the early 18th century by Somashekara Nayaka of the Keladi Nayaka dynasty to consolidate their control over northern Kerala after defeating the Kolathiri chieftains. The fort’s strategic hilltop location allowed the Nayakas to monitor coastal trade routes and defend against regional rivals. A square watchtower and seven round bastions provided observation and overlapping fields of fire. In 1763, Hyder Ali’s forces overran the region, and later, following his defeat in 1799, the East India Company assumed control, using the fort as a local administrative post until its decline in the mid‑19th century.

== Architecture ==
Hosdurg Fort occupies a low hillock and is constructed almost entirely of finely dressed laterite stones set in lime mortar, characteristic of Keladi Nayaka military works of the 18th century. Its roughly square plan is strengthened at each corner by imposing round bastions that once supported battlements and provided overlapping fields of fire. A massive rectangular watchtower rising from the southeastern rampart and reached by a stone‑hewn ramp commands panoramic views, while broad wall‑walks link the bastions and enabled rapid troop movements around the perimeter. Internally, vestiges of vaulted chambers and stone‑flagged courtyards hint at the fort's dual role as a defensive stronghold and administrative centre under the Keladi Nayakas.

== See also ==
- Bekal Fort
- Kannur Fort
- Thalassery Fort
