= K. Madhavan =

Indian activist and communist leader (1915–2016)

Kozhungal Madhavan (26 August 1915 – 25 September 2016) was an Indian independence activist and Communist leader from Kerala, India.

== Biography ==
He was born on 26 August 1915 in Kanhangad, British India to A.C Raman Nair and Kozhungal Unnanga Amma. While studying in school he joined the Salt Satyagraha (Salt March) to be the youngest of the volunteers under the leadership of K. Kelappan. On 20 August 1930, he was arrested and sent to jail on six months' rigorous imprisonment. That was the beginning of his active involvement in politics. When Travancore, Kochi and the Malabar region of congress were joined to form the Kerala Pradesh Congress Committee [KPCC] in 1921 he was the secretary. Later along with many members of the radical socialist group of the Congress party, he quit the parent organisation and joined the Communist Party of India. He died at the age of 101 on 25 September 2016.

His autobiography 'Payaswiniyude Theerangalil' (On the Banks of river Payaswini) is considered a valuable document of a transformative epoch in modern Kerala history.
