= Bellikoth Raghunath Shenoy =

Indian economist (1905–1978)

Professor Bellikoth Shenoy
- Born: 3 June 1905
- Died: 8 February 1978 (aged 72)

Academic work
- School or tradition: liberalism
- Institutions: Gujarat University

Bellikoth Ragunath Shenoy (1905–1978) was an Indian classical liberal economist. He was a highly influential advocate of classical liberalism in India and was President of the Indian Economic Association and a member of the Mont Pelerin Society.

== Biography ==
Shenoy was born near Mangalore, Madras Presidency in British India. His forefathers were from Bellikoth village, near present day Ajanur in Kasargod district. He studied economics at Benares Hindu University and later at the London School of Economics where he was highly influenced by Friedrich Hayek. In particular, he heard Hayek deliver the lectures in January 1931 that became "Prices and Production," and that began the process of his adherence to the Austrian approach to economic theory and policy. In 1931 Shenoy became the first Indian economist to have a paper published in a leading scholarly journal. As a student, Shenoy participated in the Indian independence movement and was jailed at Nagpur where he was influenced by Madan Mohan Malaviya.

Shenoy taught at Wadia College (Pune), the University of Ceylon, Gujarat University and the London School of Economics. He also worked at the Ceylon Commission on Currency, the Ceylon Department of Commerce, the Reserve Bank of India, the International Monetary Fund and the World Bank. After leaving academia, Shenoy founded the Economic Research Centre in Delhi which advocated the ideas of classical liberalism.

== Economics ==
Shenoy's work on the "Sterling balances of Reserve Bank of India", written in 1946 was the first effort by any economist to accurately calculate the World War II expenses and actual value of foreign exchange reserve with Reserve Bank of India. He claimed 1724 Crore rupees with the Reserve Bank included foreign assets of commercial banks also. Shenoy suggested devaluation of Rupee for it to attain proper parity with Pound Sterling.

In 1955, Shenoy was appointed to the Panel of Economists who were to appraise Nehru's ambitious Second Five-Year Plan, the one that aimed at "heavy industrialisation." He was the only one to submit a "Note of Dissent."

Shenoy was of the opinion that India could not finance all the money needed for rapid industrialisation and may not be able to consume all the goods thus produced.

Shenoy opined that governmental interventions in markets of all sort, though termed seasonal would end up forcing repeated interventions and would lead to distortions in production, price and storage of commodities.

Shenoy was also critical of Nehru government's penchant for import-substitution, awarding licences for industrial-production and central planning. Authority to award licences would lead to corruption was his analysis.

== Personal life ==
His daughter was Sudha R Shenoy, Ph.D. who too was a trained economist in the mould of classical liberalism. His son, Subodh Raghunath Shenoy is a noted physicist.
