= C. M. Padmanabhan Nair =

Indian politician

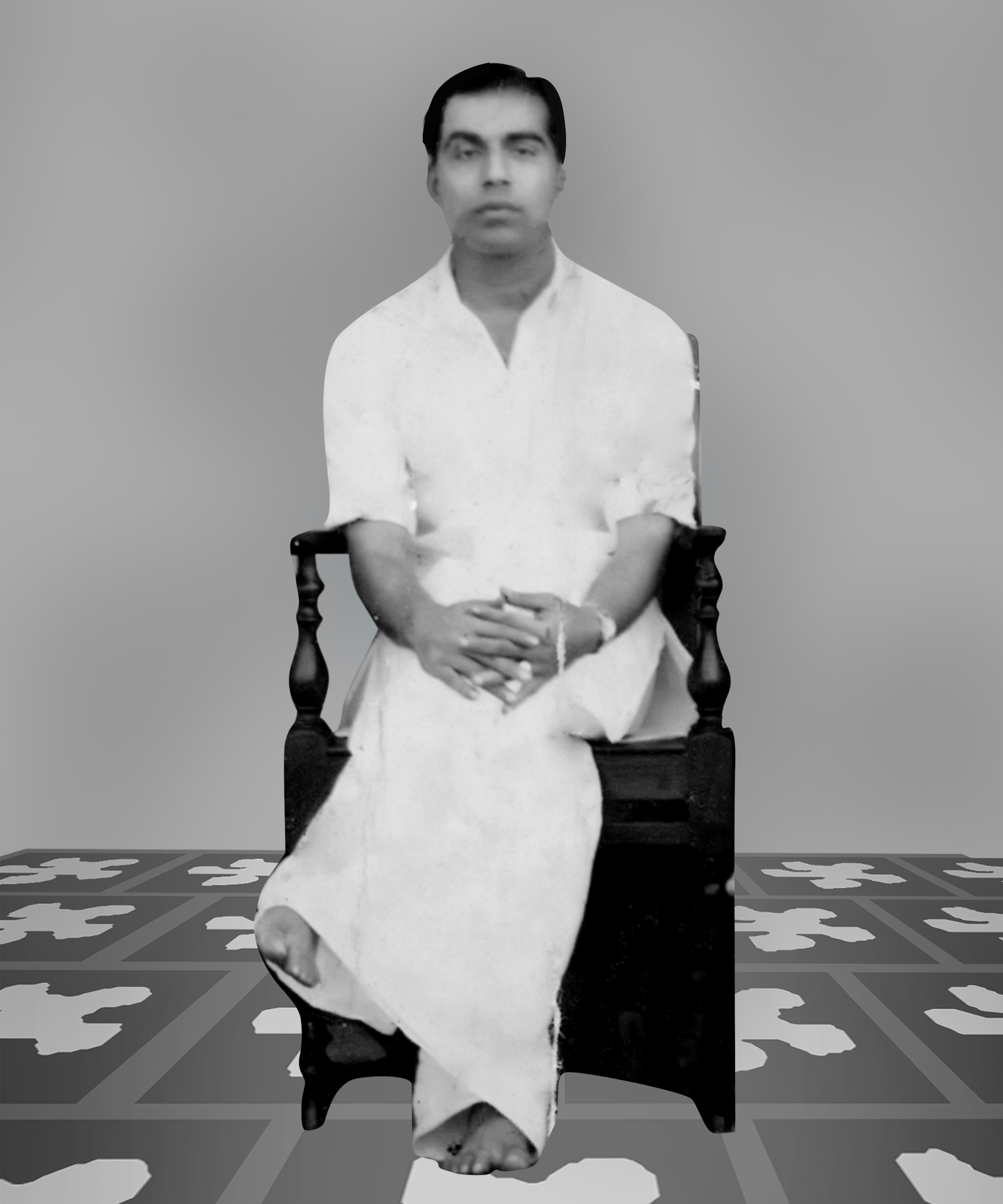
- Constituency: Trikaripur

Personal details
- Born: Trikaripur, Kasargod Kerala, India
- Died: 11 June 1977 Kanhangad, Kerala, India
- Party: Socialist Party (India)
- Spouse: Puravangara Indira Amma
- Children: Radha Sivakumar, Geetha Prabhakaran, Sethu Madhavan and Puravangara Unni Krishnan

Chandera Madiyan Padhmanabhan Nair was an Indian politician from Kerala.

== Early life ==
C. M. Padhmanabhan Nair was born in the Trikarpur village of Kerala. He was born rich but spent all his wealth to serve society. He was born in a famous Chandera Madiyan family. C. M. Kunhikammaran Nair, C.M Gopalakrishnan Nair and CM Kunhiraman Nair were his brothers.

== Marriage ==
The famous poet Vallathol had a very close friendship with CMP and even wanted him to establish a permanent relationship with his family through marriage, as indicated in their correspondence. He also visited CMP in 1949. However, for some reason, perhaps astrological, CMP married Puravangara Indira Amma, related to another notable poet, P. Kunhiraman Nair

Letter from Vallathol

== Political life ==
Initially he worked for ordnance factories in various north Indian cities. However, he was attracted to the Indian Independence movement and came back to Kerala after resigning. Inspired by the socialistic philosophy of Jaya Prakash Narayan and Dr. Ram Manohar Lohia, he joined the Socialist Party when it was formed. He contested in the first election in Madras assembly from Hosdurg against the Melath Narayanan Nambiar in 1951. See election reports on the website of Election Commission of India. Though he lost the election, he continued to build the Socialist Party in Kerala, which merged with the Janata Party in 1977.

== Business life ==
After spending his hereditary and earned wealth for society and politics, during the 1960s he became disillusioned with politics and started a stationery store in Trikaripur. Unfortunately he could not sustain the shop as most of his customers were poor people who were not able to pay their debts.

He then started CM Agency representing the Patanwala company in Bombay. When he went to Bombay to discuss the business deal, socialist party members gave him a memorable welcome. He was also given a gold medal by B.D. Jetty (former Chief Minister of Karnataka and former President of India) for his achievements during this tenure. However, he was not happy and wanted to create employments by becoming an entrepreneur. He attempted various businesses such as hotel, newspaper, and finance, but he could not sacrifice his humanitarian values for business. He soon realised that he could not succeed in business and went to various holy places without informing anyone.

== Return to political life ==
After a few failed business ventures, he came back to Kerala in response to an invitation from K. Chandrasekharan and M. P. Veerendrakumar. Active members of the socialist party such as Sri Karthambu Mistri and Sri Koran Master played an important role in convincing him to return to politics. After coming back he served as the chairman of the party at Cannanore District. He started living in Bellikoth, Ajanoor, Kanhangad in the house inherited by his wife.

== Contributions during emergency ==
He was one of the few leaders who actively and courageously opposed emergency declared by the government. He was arrested during emergency and placed in jail till 1977 when the emergency was lifted.

== Contributions to cooperative sector ==
He played a critical role in establishing many cooperative institutions in Kerala. He held positions in many cooperative societies such as Trikaripur Cooperative Bank, Cooperative Store, Rural Housing Society, Malabar District Bank, Nileshwaram, and Coconut Marketing Society. His term as president of the Kottacherry Cooperative Society is noteworthy due to the progress he made during his tenure (1977–1978).

== Death ==
He died on 11 June 1978 due to a heart attack. The people of Trikarpur have built a library in the town in his name as a memorial.

The Janata Party National Executive council held on 11 July 1978 under the Prime Minister Morarji Desai honored him and a few other party leaders by observing a moment of silence, as per the minutes of the meeting.

== See also ==
- Kanhangad
