= State Highway 57 (Kerala) =

Road in Kerala, India

State Highway 57
- Kasaragod – Kanhangad Road
- SH 57 highlighted in red

Route information
- Maintained by Kerala Public Works Department
- Length: 28.0 km (17.4 mi)

Major junctions
- North end: NH 66 in Kasaragod
- SH 56 in Kanhangad
- South end: NH 66 in Kanhangad south

Location
- Country: India
- State: Kerala
- Districts: Kasaragod

Highway system
- Roads in India; Expressways; National; State; Asian; State Highways in Kerala
← SH 56	→ SH 58

State Highway 57 (SH 57) is a state highway in Kerala, India that starts in Kasaragod and ends in Kanhangad. The highway is 28 km long.

== Route map ==
Kasaragod – Uduma – Bekal - Pallikkara – Chamundikunnu - Kanhangad South

== See also ==
- Roads in Kerala
- List of state highways in Kerala
- Kerala
