= Anandashram, Kanhangad =

Spiritual retreat in Kasaragod, Kerala

Anandashram
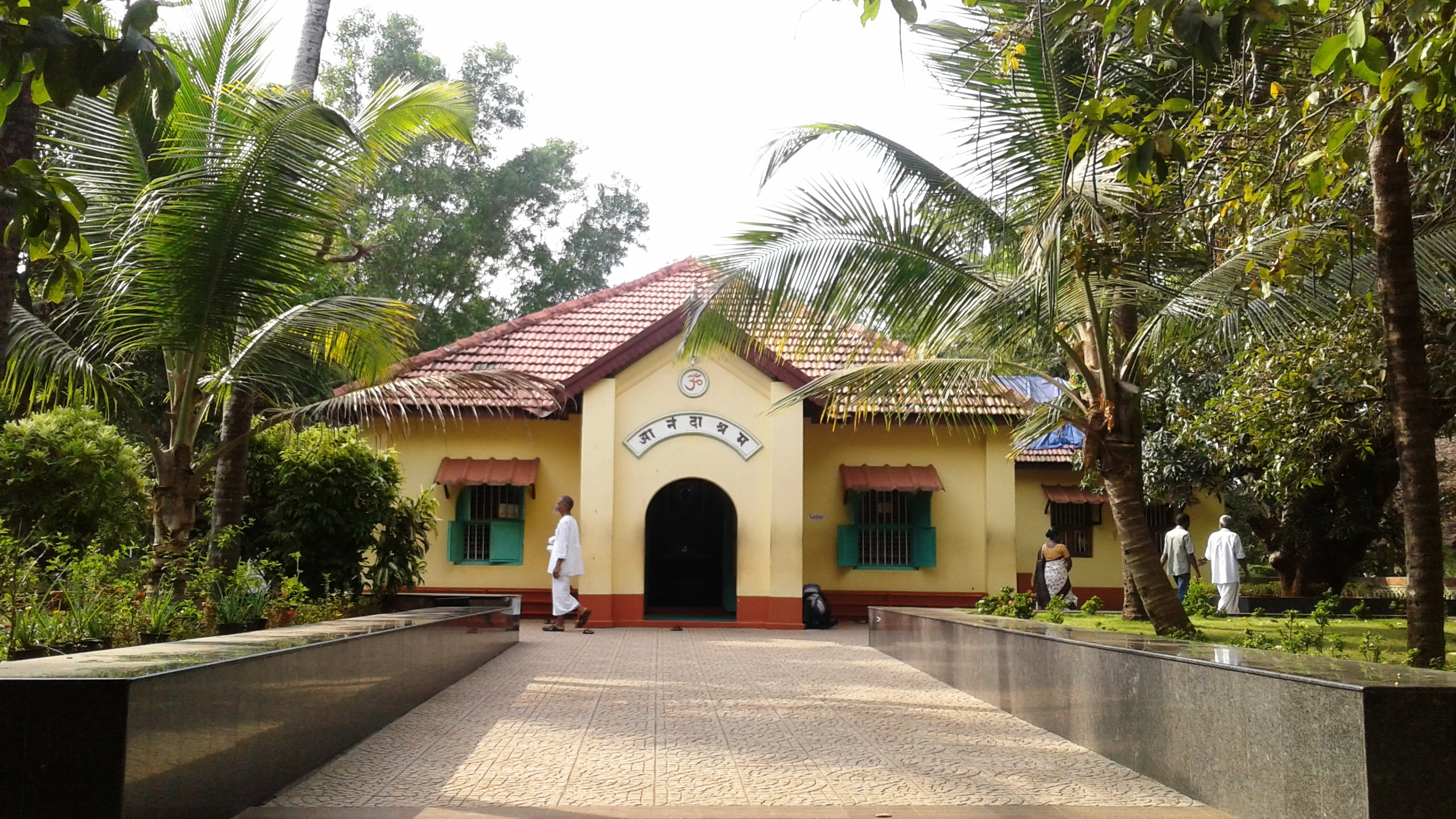
- The original building
- Type: Private management
- Established: 1931
- Founders: Swami Ramdas and Mother Krishnabai
- Location: Anandashram P.O., Kanhangad 671531, Dist. Kasaragod, Kerala, India, Kanhangad, Kerala, India
- Website: www.anandashram.org

Anandashram (English translation = "Abode of Bliss") is a spiritual retreat located in Kanhangad, a city and a municipality in Kasaragod district in the Indian state of Kerala. Anandashram was founded by Swami Ramdas and Mother Krishnabai, also called Papa Ramdas and Pujya Mataji, in 1931.

== History ==
The idea of setting up an ashram or spiritual centre called "Anandashram" seems to have first occurred to Swami Ramdas in Bombay. He had stayed in Kasaragod in North Kerala where he had been, according to his memoirs, "put up in a thatched hut on the Pilikunji Hill." While in Bombay, Swami Ramdas wrote to Anandrao (his brother in Kasaragod) "expressing a wish to have an Ashram in that place on the Pilikunji hill. [Swami Ramdas] also suggested that it might be named 'Anandashram.'" A small Ashram consisting of a tiny room and an open veranda was constructed upon the hill, to the south of which flowed the Payashwini river. This Anandashram was inaugurated on 3 June 1928. In a letter dated 14 June 1928, Swami Ramdas describes the Ashram thus: "For about a fortnight last, Ramdas has been occupying the new Ashram, got ready for His child by Sri Ram. It is situated in a jungle, at the foot of hills, near a swift running stream. The place is calm and blissful. Morning and evening, the sweet notes of birds fill the air with thrills of ecstasy. Within the Ashram, hymns are sung, and the chanting of God's names goes on, all day and night. Devotees of God are pouring in numbers. Ramdas is merged in a sea of bliss. The Ashram is named "Anandashram"."

On 7 June 1928, just four days after the establishment of the Ashram in Kasaragod, the young widow Krishnabai arrived in Kasaragod to stay with her sister-in-law. This ashram proved to be the site for the sadhana and self-realization of Mother Krishnabai. By 1930, she had left her family and was living permanently in the Ashram. Her presence in the Ashram provoked scandal, causing the Ashram's regular inmates to leave; the number of visitors also dwindled.

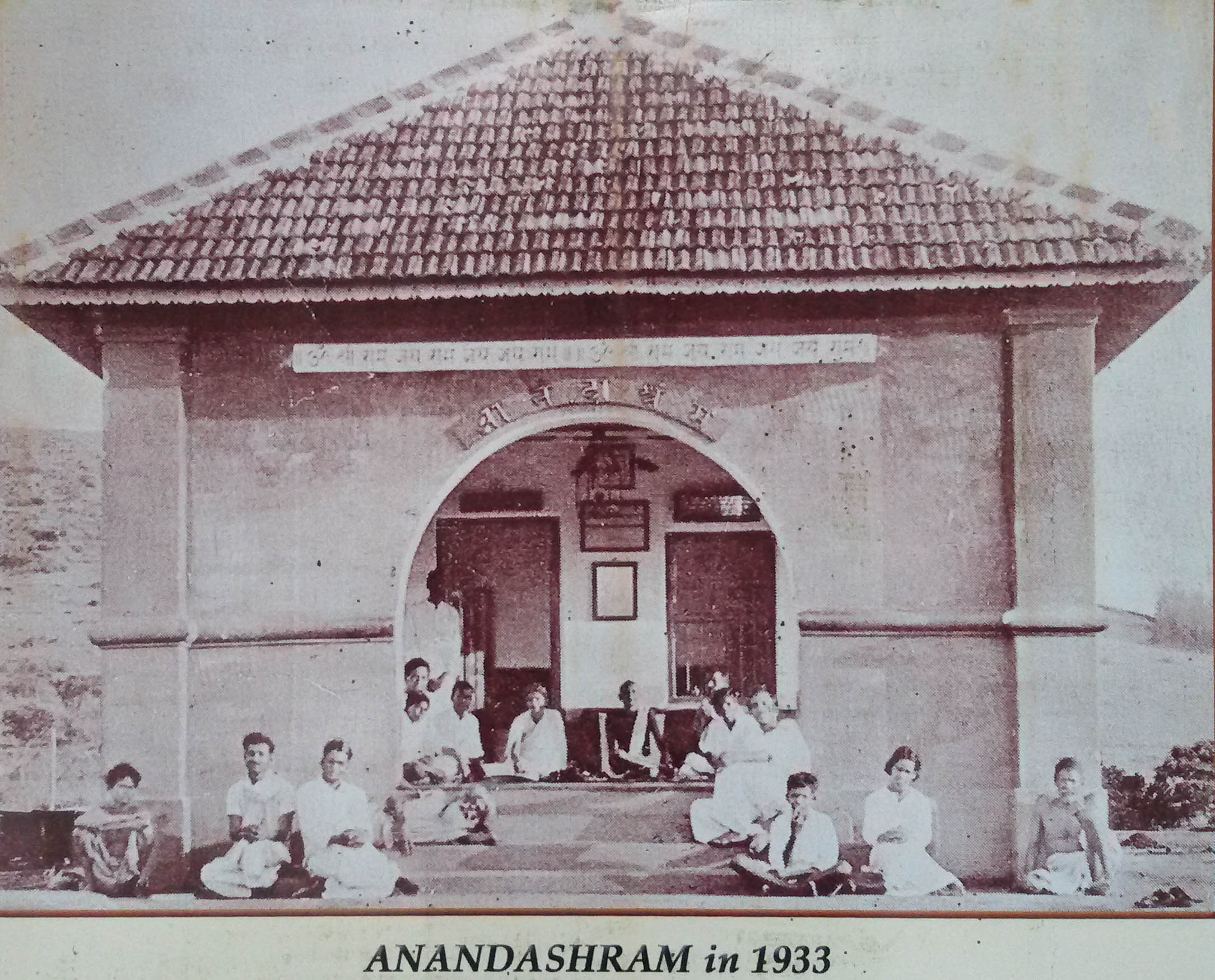
Anandashram in 1933

In 1931, after Mataji Krishnabai completed her sadhana and gained the experience of nirvikalpa samadhi, Swami Ramdas and Mataji were forced to abandon the Ashram permanently following a physical attack on Mataji Krishnabai by a pair of strangers. A few days later, while staying in Kanhangad, Swami Ramdas's friends and devotees suggested that a new Ashram be set up near the Manjapati hill in Kanhangad. Swami Ramdas agreed, and the new Ashram, also called 'Anandashram,' was opened on 15 May 1931. The surrounding area, which was called Manjapati before the establishment of the Ashram, is now known as Ramnagar.

The Ashram grew from its tiny initial structure to the present complex of low-rise buildings. Many of the buildings constructed by the Ashram were given away to those who worked in the Ashram or handed over to the Government to run various social welfare schemes and schools. The Ashram provides free food for all visitors, and free accommodation for a limited period of time. There are special buildings for wandering sadhus and sanyasis. The Ashram publishes a journal called The Vision as well as a number of books by Swami Ramdas (who was a prolific writer) and others.

== Death and legacy ==
After the mahasamadhi of Swami Ramdas in 1963, Mataji Krishnabai headed Anandashram until her own passing in 1989. Swami Sachidananda, who joined the ashram in 1949, took over the leadership of the Ashram until he died in 2008. Now Swami Muktananda heads the Ashram.

== Purpose of the Ashram ==
During the inaugural ceremony of the Ashram, Swami Ramdas gave a short speech describing the purpose of the Ashram: "The ideal which the ashram holds before it is universal love and service, based upon a vision of divinity in all beings and creatures of the world. Here every man, woman or child, to whatever denomination, creed, or caste the person may belong, shall have free access. This is a place where every effort will be made to cultivate the spirit of mutual love and service, so that what is realized within its walls may prove as an example for the right conduct of human life in outside world."

== Location ==
Anandashram is located at a junction on the national highway approximately 5 km from the city of Kanhangad in Kasaragod district, Kerala. Visitors to the Ashram during the early decades of its founding describe a view of the Arabian Sea to the left and a vast valley in front of the Ashram. The views have since been blocked out by the trees that were planted on what had been a barren hill and by the growth of the town of Kanhangad. Around the time of India's independence, visitors speak of an uphill ride in a bullock cart through a sparsely populated countryside from the Kanhangad railway station to reach Anandashram. Today, the Ashram abuts a busy road with shops and hospitals and is serviced by local and long-distance buses; it takes about 15 minutes by car or auto rikshaw (tuk tuk) to reach the railway station. The nearest airport is in Mangalore, which is two hours away (by road or rail) from the Ashram.

Swami Ramdas believed that at one time the Manjapati hill was covered by a thick forest in which sadhus and sanyasins performed austerities. It was also believed that the hill had been the site of a temple and a tank. Anandashram is close to Nityanandashram, set up by Bhagavan Nityananda of Ganeshpuri, and to Guruvanam, another place of importance in the life of Bhagavan Nityananda.

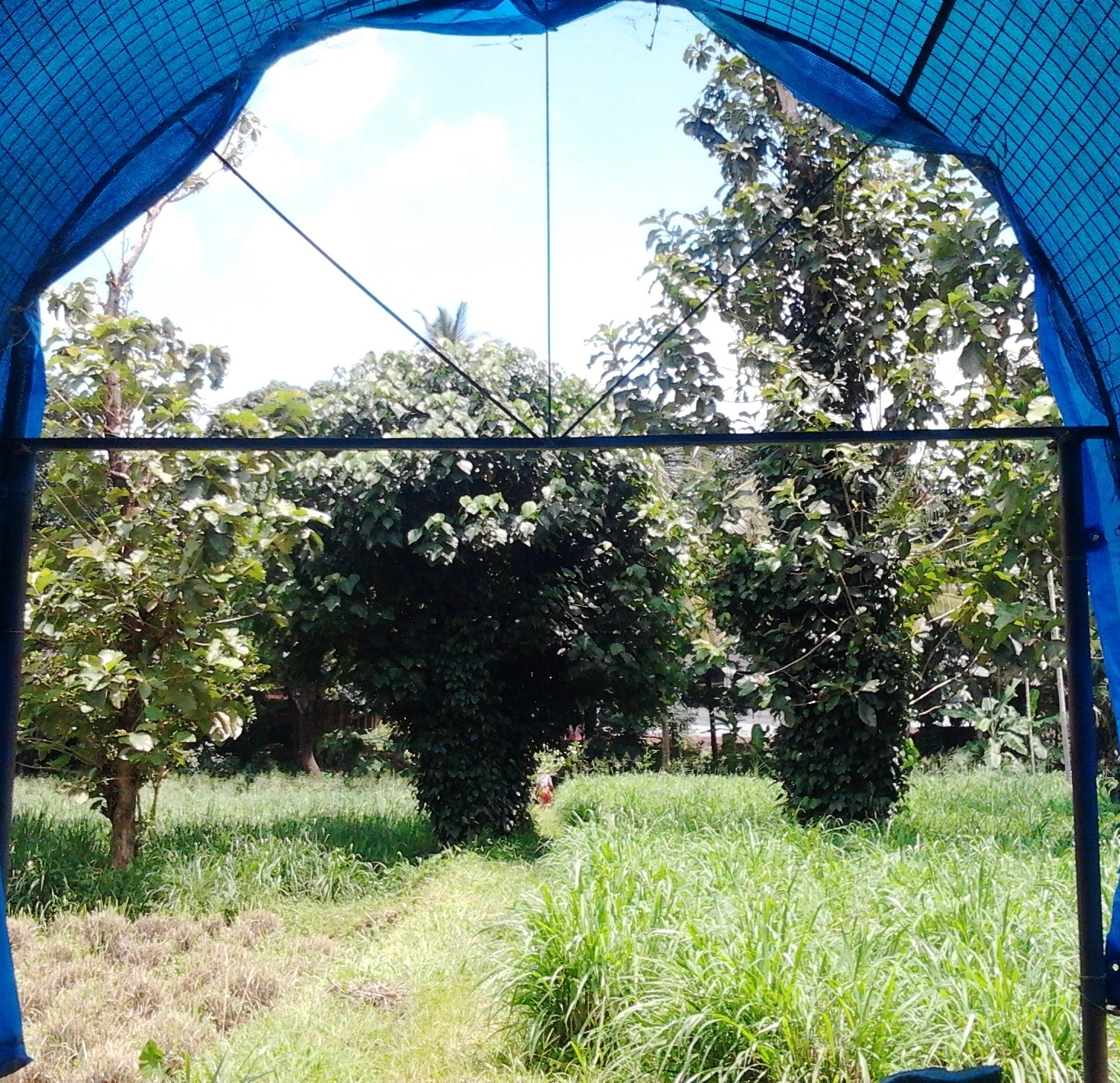
The ashram has a niche for meditation in the middle of green fields

Swami Ramdas sometimes used "Anandashram" as a metaphor. He once wrote in a letter to a friend: "Ramdas reiterates with a saint who cries out, "Joy - always Joy". But where is this joy? Is it in the Ashram or in the heart of the Ashramite? Or, in the heart of the one, who has tuned himself to the immortal source of joy within oneself? Verily, Anandashram is in your own heart; Anandashram, the blissful expression of God, which is the entire universe, is really within you."

== Transportation ==
The road on the west has access to NH66 which connects to Mangalore in the north and Calicut in the south. The nearest railway station is Kanhangad on the Mangalore-Palakkad line. There are two airports that are a 2-hour drive from the Ashram: the Mangalore or Mangaluru International Airport which is 86 kilometres from the Ashram and the Kannur International Airport which is 89 kilometres from the Ashram.

== Daily routine ==
The Ashram is centered around the single activity of chanting the mantra "Om Sri Ram Jai Ram Jai Jai Ram."

During the lifetime of Swami Ramdas, the mantra was chanted throughout the day in the main Bhajan Hall, except for the times when he would engage in discussions with visitors in the Bhajan Hall after lunch and dinner. Devotees used to meditate in Swami Ramdas's room from 5 am to 6 am, after which Swami Ramdas would spend the day with the devotees. Dinner was served at 7.30 pm.

Today the mantra is chanted from 6 am to 6 pm in one of the three samadhis or tombs in the Ashram: the samadhis of Swami Ramdas, Mataji Krishnabai, and Swami Sachidananda. In the Bhajan hall, in addition to Ramnam, the following are also chanted: Vishnusahasranam, Gurustuti, Hanuman Chalisa, chapters of the Gita by children, "Arunachala Shiva", "Namo Ramanaya" and "Aksharamanamala" (in deference to Sri Ramana Maharshi), "Om Nama Shivaya" and "Hare Rama Hare Krishna." Spaces are also available for silent meditation. The practice of meditating in Swami Ramdas's room in the early hours of the morning continues.

However, visitors are not under any compulsion to participate in these activities. What N.B. Butani, an early devotee of Swami Ramdas and Mother Krishnabai, said of the Ashram in 1946 continues to hold true: "There is only one condition for stay in that Ashram: there is a bell rung four times a day when, wherever you be, whatever you be engaged in you must drop and run to the dining hall for breakfast, lunch, afternoon tea and dinner; for the rest, you may go in for any study you like or for any Sadhana you please." The difference now is that there is no bell for the afternoon tea; instead, tea is carried by Ashram workers all around the Ashram buildings and given to devotees wherever they might have chosen to spend the warm afternoon hours.

== Free food ==
Anandashram gives free breakfast, lunch, tea and dinner to all devotees who stay in the hostels inside the Ashram and also to all casual visitors. The food is vegetarian and includes plenty of milk products made out of milk from the Ashram cows.

== Inside Anandashram ==
Standing below the arch one can see the main Ashram building on an elevated hilly spot at a distance of about 250 meters. The path from the arch to the main gate of the Ashram is lined by tall Polyalthia longifolia (or false Asoka) trees that create a dense wall on either side.

Reception: As one enters the gate, to the right is the Reception office to welcome visiting devotees, register their names and allot accommodation.

The Flag: A few meters from the gate there is a small circular garden and on its southern side stands the flag mast atop which flutters the Ashram insignia with the holy Ram Nam printed on it. The aim of human life is realization of God, for which the easiest way is constant remembrance of God. The flag reminds the visitors and residents of this goal and the act of hoisting the flag symbolizes our commitment to raise the people to the higher plane and attain the goal.

On important days, e.g.: Jayanthi and Samadhi days of Papa Ramdas and Pujya Mataji and also on Sannyas day of Papa, a new flag is hoisted amidst chanting of Ram Nam.

Information Centre: To the right of the circular garden is a small cottage which is the Information Centre. All new visitors are shown a video giving a general idea about the Ashram and its activities.

Book Stall: To the left of the circular garden is the Book Stall, from where visitors can get all the books published by the Ashram.

Satsang Hall: Adjacent to the Books Stall is the Satsang Hall, where the reading of the books of Papa Ramdas and other saints is taken up every afternoon between 3:30 p.m. and 4:30 p.m.

Panchavati: Going up a few steps from the garden, one comes to the Panchavati. The name signifies five trees planted by Papa Ramdas in 1931. On this level ground of about 60' x 200,' Papa Ramdas (Swami Ramdas) used to conduct Satsang in the mornings and evenings.

Bhajan Hall: A few steps ahead is the Ashram Bhajan Hall. Several years ago, Papa Ramdas, sitting on an Asan in the centre of the Bhajan Hall, used to have a direct view right up to the main road.

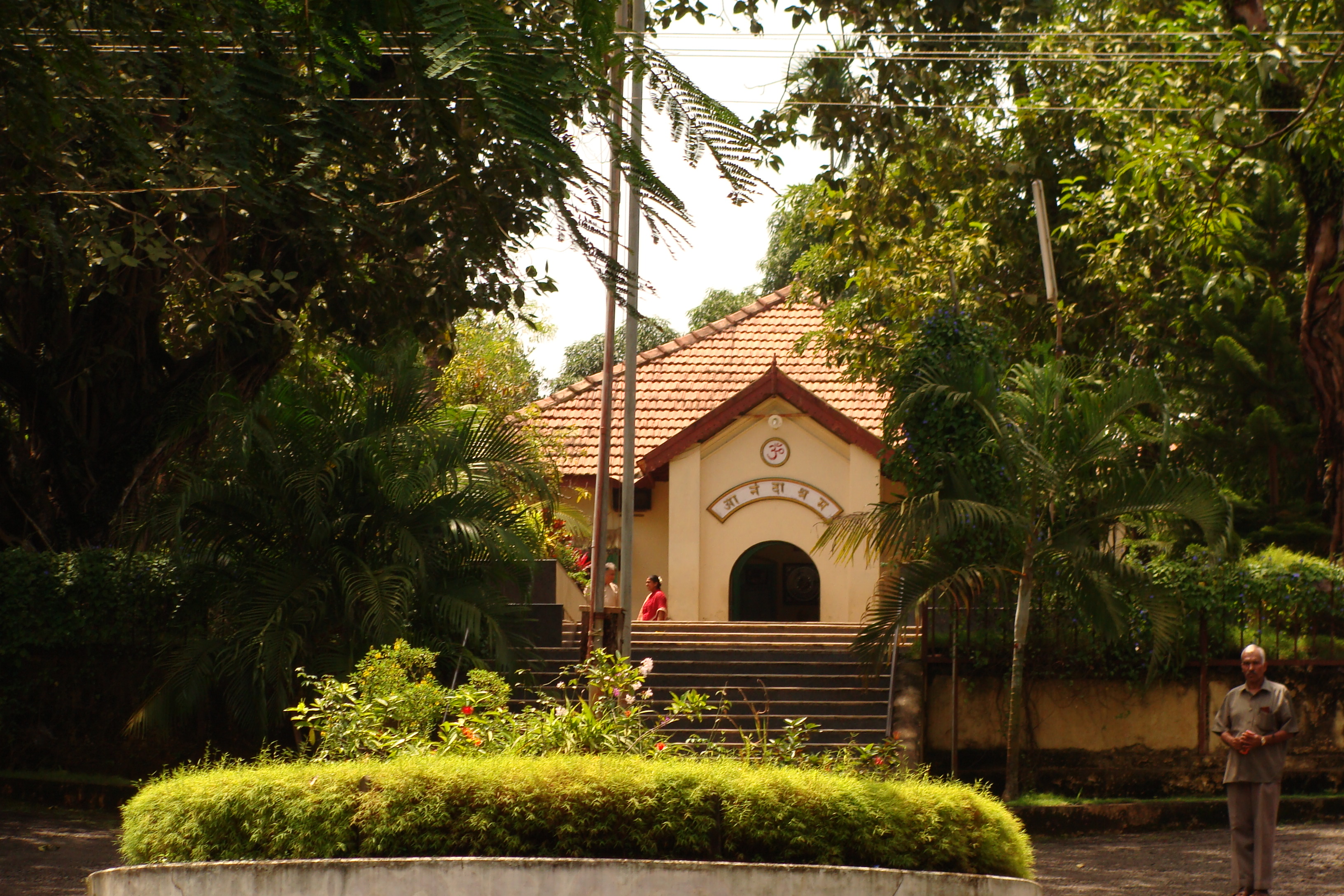
Bhajan Hall with the flagpole in the foreground

At the southern end of the Bhajan Hall is a small room. This small room was the "Anandashram" started by Papa Ramdas in 1931. It was here that Papa Ramdas and Mataji lived with a handful of devotees in those early days of the Ashram, and it was the launch pad for their unique mission of Universal Love and Service. This room is now called the shrine.

The relics of Papa Ramdas are preserved in a silver box, which is placed over a marble platform in the shrine, packed with the holy ashes of Papa Ramdas and Mataji and several books containing Ram Nam written by devotees. On either side of the silver box, marble replicas of Papa's, Mataji's and Swami Satchidananda's holy feet are implanted. Pictures of Papa Ramdas, Mataji and Swami Satchidananda are placed on the wall above the platform. The walls of this room are adorned with pictures of Gurudev (Papa's father and Guru), Papa's photo as a young man of 17, as well as pictures of parents of Papa and Mataji.

The bhajan hall is built around this shrine. The hall is adorned with Papa Ramdas Ramdas's cut-out in the same posture as he used to sit during the bhajan sessions, and flanking it are similar cut-outs of Mataji and Swami Sachidanandaji. On the walls of the bhajan hall one can see pictures of several saints and sages, including those of Jesus Christ, Zoroaster, Guru Nanak, Shirdi Sai Baba, Anandamayi Ma, and Jiddu Krishnamurti.

Centenary Hall: To the right of the bhajan hall is the centenary hall. Coinciding with the 100th birthday of Mataji, a new spacious hall for satsang was constructed and christened Mother Krishnabai Centenary Hall on 25 September 2003.

Samadhi Mandirs: There are three Samadhi Mandirs – of Papa Ramdas, Pujya Mataji, and Swami Satchidananda. These are situated to the left of the main gate.

The Samadhi mandirs are uniform in design – a 16' x 16' tile-roofed structure, large twin doors on all the four sides and eight windows. The Ram Mantram "Om Sri Ram Jai Ram Jai Jai Ram", in the style written by Papa Ramdas, Mataji and Swamiji, is engraved on the wooden panels above the windows. The windows and doors are carved, the Samadhi platform and the floor are set with white marble, and the ceiling is decorated with carved and painted Ram Nams. A portrait in standing pose of Papa, Mataji and Swamiji adorn the wall just above the southern door of the respective Samadhis.

Goshala:

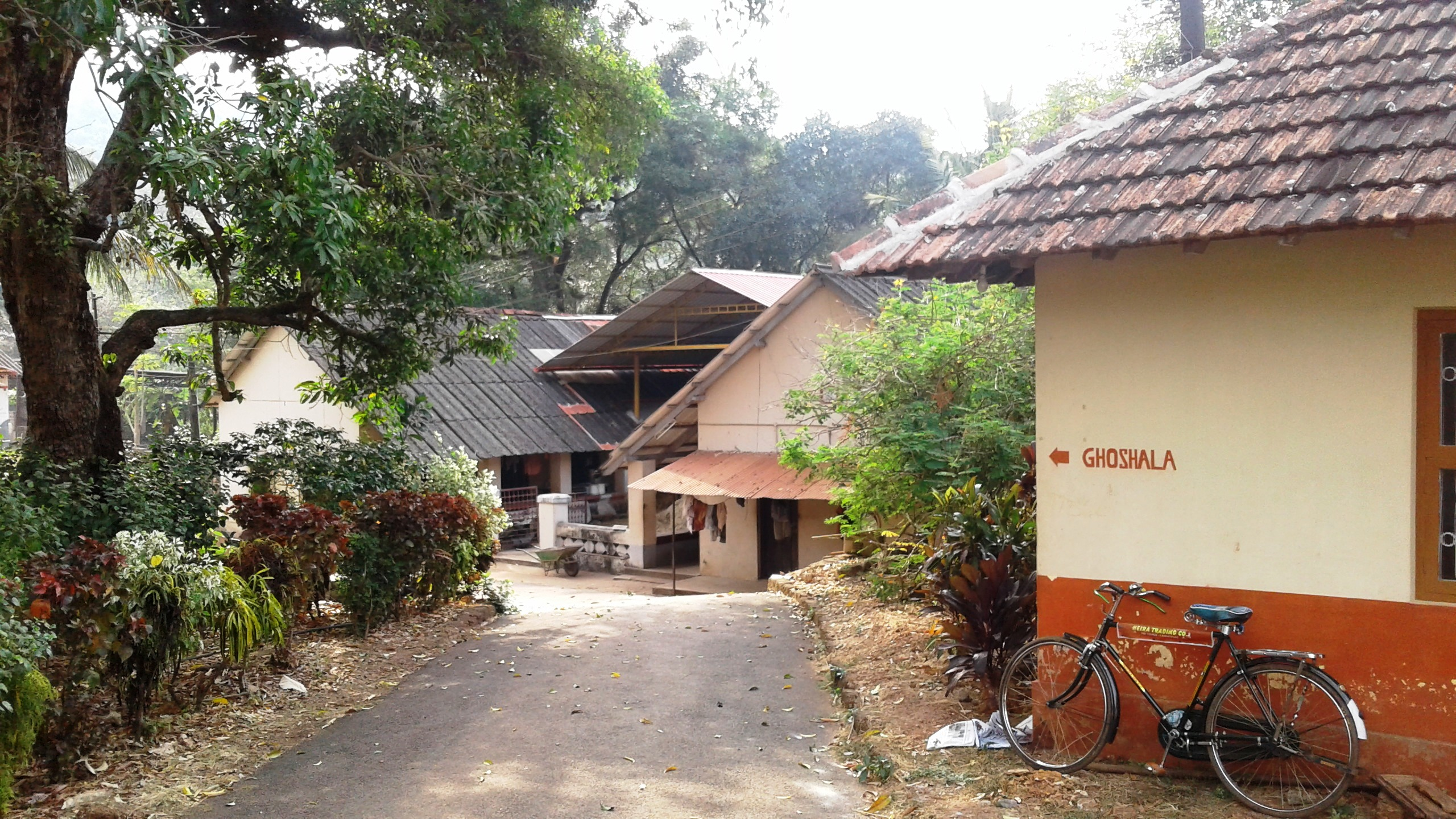
The Cattleshed

The Ashram has a Goshala (Cow Shed), in the south-east corner of the campus, with over 50 heads of cattle. The milk yield is passed on to the Ashram Bhojan Shala (Canteen) which feeds not only the devotees but also the poor and hungry who happen to come to the Ashram. The Goshala is fitted with ceiling fans to keep the cows cool, and most of the time, recordings of Ramnam by Swami Ramdas and Mother Krishnabai are played. According to one source, in the Goshala one encounters "some of the happiest cows you'll ever see in India."

Library and Ramnam Bank: A library in the Ashram provides an opportunity to visiting devotees to gain spiritual knowledge through well over five thousand spiritual and religious books in different languages. Right next to the library is the "Ram Nam Bank", where written repetitions of the phrase "Om Sri Ram Jai Ram Jai Jai Ram" are provided by devotees in notebooks (or any written medium). Ram Nam Likhit Japa was started with a target of 25 crores (1 crore = 10 million units). The goal was to provide a symbolic presentation of the likhit japa note-books to Pujya Mataji on 29 September 1955, on the occasion of the Silver Jubilee Celebration of her renunciation. However the likhit japa continued even after that, though with lesser intensity, and is still continuing. The total likhit japa is over 75 crores, or 750 million repetitions of the phrase "Om Sri Ram Jai Ram Jai Jai Ram". When Vinoba Bhaveji visited the Ashram in the 1950s and saw the Ram Nam Bank, he said, "These are more powerful than atom bombs."

== In popular culture ==
Anandashram was filmed while both founders were alive by Arnaud Desjardins for his 1959 film Ashrams.

== Image gallery ==
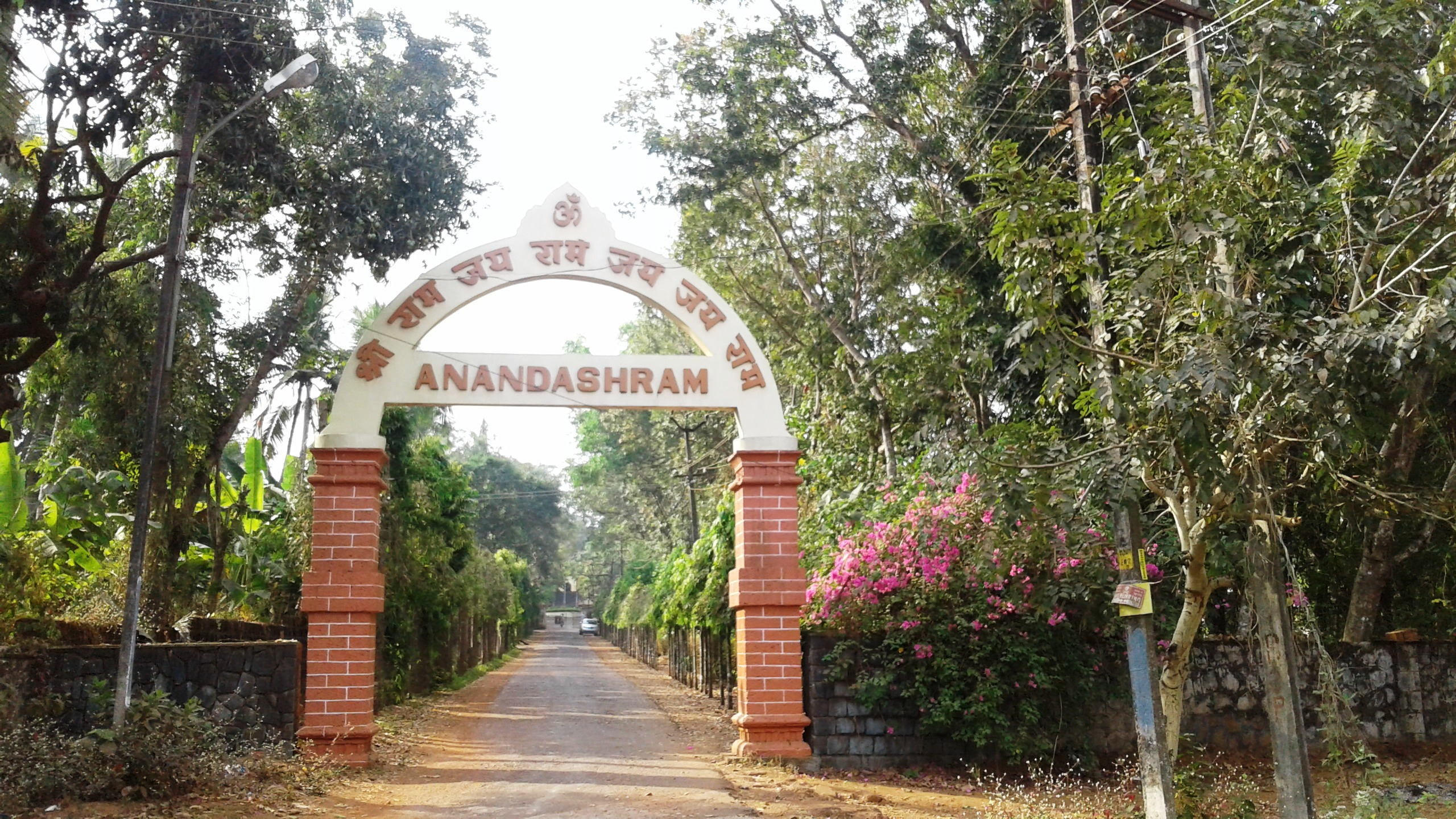
Ashram entrance

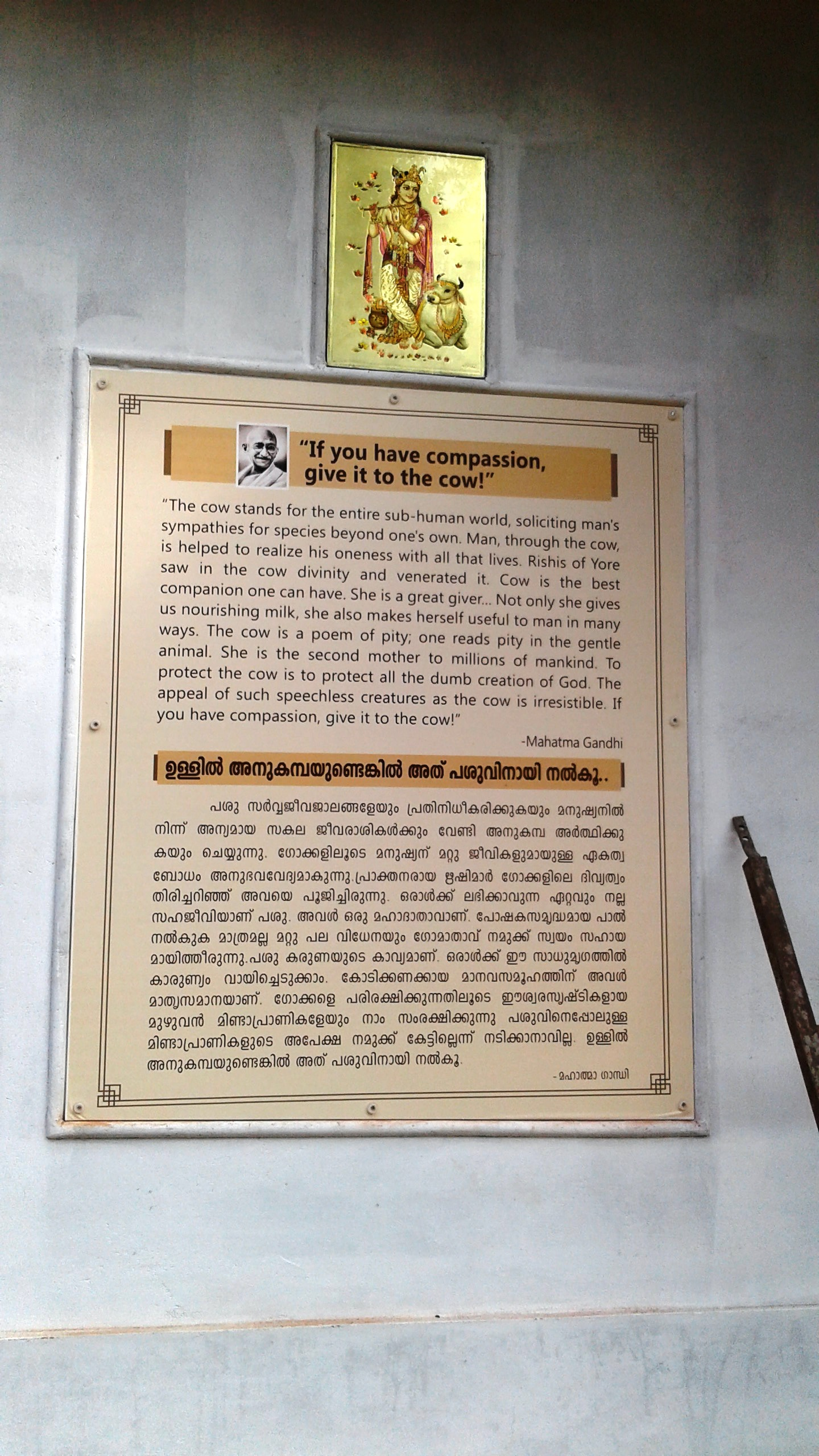
Goshala

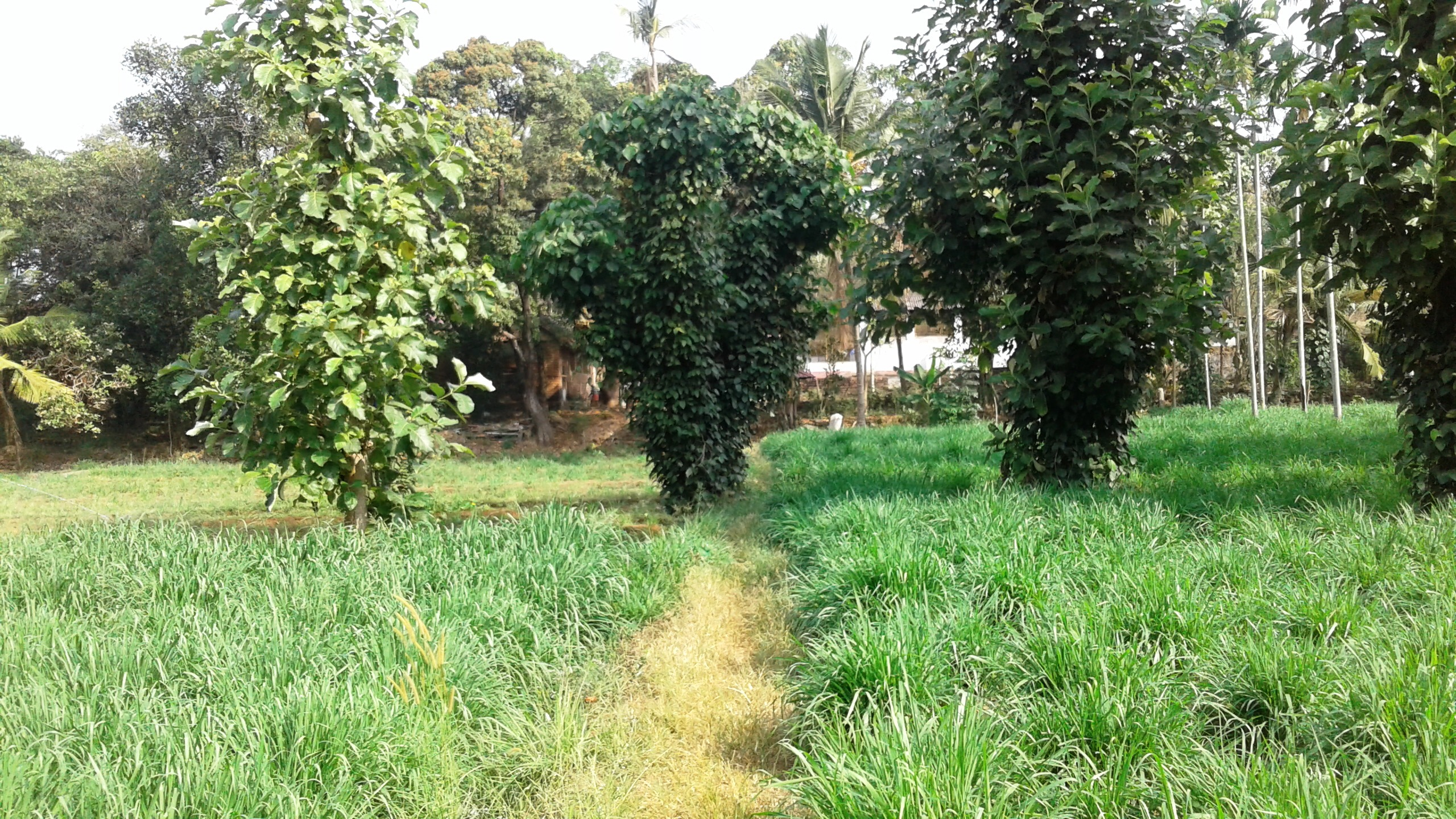
Goshala

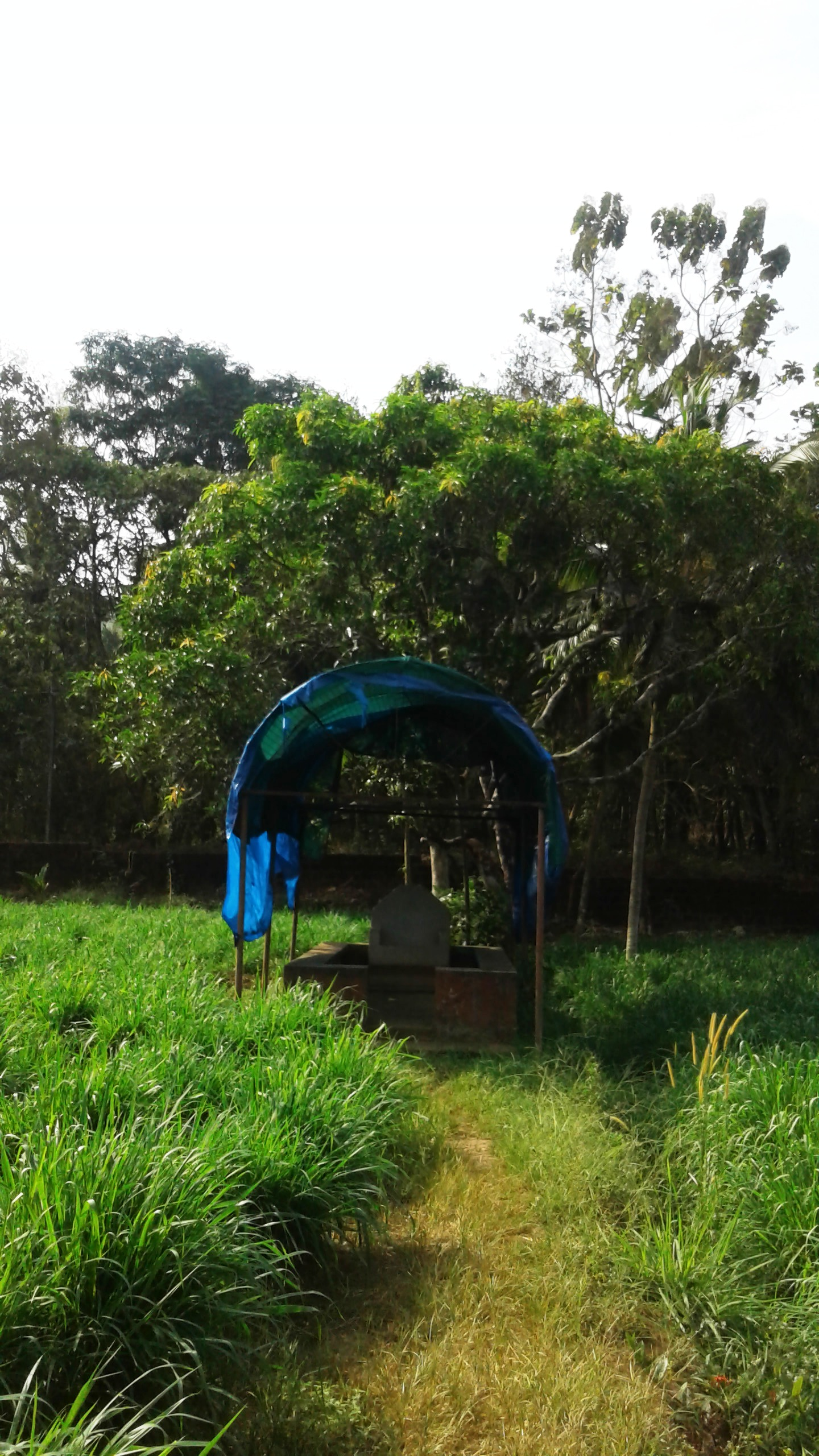
Poet Retreat

== See also ==
- Kanhangad
- Mavungal
- Sri Ramana Ashram
