= Sudha Shenoy =

Indian Austrian economic historian (1943–2008)

Sudha R Shenoy (1943– 31 May 2008), was an Austrian economist and economic historian. She worked as a lecturer in economics at the University of Newcastle in Australia from 1986 to 2004. Shenoy was a noted scholar and served as an adjunct scholar at the Ludwig Von Mises Institute and as an Honorary Associate in economic history at the School of Policy. She died in May 2008 after a long battle with cancer.

== Education ==
Shenoy completed her education at Mount Carmel School and St. Xavier's College, Ahmedabad. She later studied at the London School of Economics, the University of Virginia, and SOAS. She established the Whig Society with a fellow student on Hayek's advice. She was known to be a knowledgeable, vivacious, and enthusiastic proponent of classical liberal ideas.

== Career ==
Shenoy completed her PhD at the London School of Economics, where her father, noted economist Bellikoth Raghunath Shenoy, also studied under Nobel Laureate Friedrich Hayek. She also held visiting posts at California State University, Ohio University, and George Mason University. She also taught at the Cranfield School of Management in the United Kingdom and the University of Sydney, followed by a long stint at the University of Newcastle. She authored several books and articles, primarily related to economic development and India, and edited A Tiger by the Tail: The Keynesian Legacy of Inflation, a collection of Hayek's writings on Keynesian policies, with commentary and analysis. Her paper on 'Pricing for Refuse Removal' won 3rd place in the Evan Durbin Competition run by the Institute of Economic Affairs.

As an economist, Shenoy was well-versed in common law, the history of international trade, and the life and works of Hayek. She became a member of the Mont Pelerin Society before 30. In her own words, her book on Keynesianism came out at "a psychologically critical moment in British economic thinking, if you will." It was celebrated in the British financial press with a leading reporter, Samuel Brittan, publicly repenting his previous Keynesianism and crediting the book for his conversion.

== Works ==
=== Books ===
- Underdevelopment and Economic Growth (1970)
- Central Planning in India: A Critical Review (1971)
- India: Progress or Poverty? A Review of the Outcome of Central Planning in India (1971)
- Towards a Theoretical Framework for British and International Economic History (2010)

=== Other publications ===
- Statism and Free Markets (1962)
- Selective "Injustice" (1965)
- The Coming Serfdom in India (1966)
- The Sources of Monopoly (1966)
- A Tiger by the Tail: The Keynesian Legacy of Inflation by FA Hayek (edited by Shenoy, published with analysis and commentary in 1972, 1978, and 1979)
- The Economic & Social History of Continental Europe & Britain, c. 1000-1914: An Introductory, Annotated Reading-List for Economists
- Wage-Price Control: Myth and Reality (1978, as editor)
- Austrian Capital Theory and the Underdeveloped Areas: An Overview (1991)
- The Division of Labor is World-Wide (2004)
- Investment Chains through History or a Historian's Outline of Development: ‘Using Goods of Ever Higher Orders’ (2007)

=== Lectures and recordings ===
- The New Global Marketplace (Lecture, 2006)
- How I Stopped Worrying and Learned to Love the Trade Deficit (Lecture, 2007)

=== Interviews ===
- The Global Perspective: An Interview with Sudha Shenoy (2003)

=== Works about Shenoy ===
- Austrian economics and development: The case of Sudha Shenoy's analysis (2018)
- Breaking Out and Through (2022)
- Sudha R Shenoy, in Chapter 8 - World Economy, in Women's International Thought: Towards a New Canon (2022)
