= Swami Ramdas =

Hindu guru

- The cover of the 2018 edition of Swami Ramdas autobiography, IN QUEST OF GOD, describing his spiritual search. This book was first published in 1925.
- Born: 10 April 1884; Kanhangad, Madras Presidency, British India (present-day Kerala, India)
- Died: 25 July 1963 (aged 79); Anandashram, Kanhangad, Kerala, India

Swami Ramdas (Hindi pronunciation: [sʋaːmiː raːmdaːs]), born Vittal Rao (10 April 1884 to 25 July 1963), was an Indian saint, philosopher, philanthropist and pilgrim.

Swami Ramdas became a wandering ascetic in his late 30s and, after attaining spiritual liberation or moksha while still alive, established Anandashram in Kanhangad, Kerala. He is the author of several books; the spiritual autobiography In Quest of God (1925) is his best known work.

== Biography ==
=== Early life: 1884-1922 ===
Swami Ramdas was born as Vittal Rao in Hosdurg, Kerala, India on 10 April 1884 to Balakrishna Rao and Lalita Bai. Vittal was educated first at a local school in Hosdurg and was later sent to Mangalore to study at the Basel Evangelical Mission High School run by German missionaries. He was a voracious reader and was admired for his mastery of the English language; he was also interested in drawing, sculpture and theatre. His indifference to his school curriculum, however, kept him from passing high school despite attempting his exams twice. After a failed attempt to run away to Bombay to seek his fortune and a brief stint as the director of an amateur theatre society he founded in Hosdurg (they opened with scenes from Shakespeare's King John), Vittal joined a course in drawing and engraving at the School of Arts in Madras. Before completing the course, however, he won a scholarship to study textile engineering at the Victoria Jubilee Institute in Bombay. This time, he completed the degree and found work as a spinning master in a cotton mill in Gulbarga.

Vittal Rao was expected to marry, and within a few months of finding a job, his parents found him a bride. He married Umabai (renamed 'Rukmabai' upon her marriage according to the custom of the Saraswats) in 1908. Within a couple of months of this event, however, Vittal Rao had lost his job at Gulbarga. He moved from one job to another across southern India, with spells of unemployment in between. A daughter, Ramabai, was born in 1913.

Vittal Rao's fortunes continued to decline, and in 1917, he returned to Mangalore to join his father-in-law's business. This arrangement did not last long; in 1919, he started his own saree dyeing and printing business. By 1920, both his professional and personal lives had deteriorated, and Vittal Rao became unhappy and frustrated. In his desperate state, he sought relief in the chanting of the syllable "Ram" considered sacred in India. Soon afterwards, his father instructed him to repeat the longer Ram Mantra: "Sri Ram jai Ram jai jai Ram" and assured him that the chanting of this mantra would give him eternal happiness. Vittal Rao felt inspired to add "Om" to each repetition, and he began to chant the mantra "Om Sri Ram Jai Ram Jai Jai Ram" all through his waking hours. He was also influenced by the teachings of Sri Krishna.

=== Renunciation and the quest for God: 1922-23 ===
Vittal Rao soon lost interest in the material world. He left home on the night of 27 December 1922 after writing a farewell letter to his wife. At Srirangam, on the banks of the river Kaveri, he adopted sanyas by giving himself the ochre robes of a renunciate. He changed his name to 'Ramdas' and took three vows: to dedicate his life to Sri Ram, to observe celibacy, and to live only on food freely offered to him as alms. His practice was to view the world as forms of Ram – and thus to see everything that might befall him as the will of Ram. Ramdas was known for referring to himself in the third person, which is a common spiritual practice in Hinduism.

After visiting various centres of Hindu pilgrimage in Tamil Nadu, including Rameswaram, Madurai and Chidambaram, Swami Ramdas arrived in Tiruvannamalai. Here he met and received the blessings of the young saint known as Sri Ramana Maharshi. As a result, he went into his first retreat and lived for 21 days in solitude in a cave in Arunachala. There, he had his first full experience of Ram, or God, as a presence permeating everything. For him, from this point, "All was Ram, nothing but Ram."

Swami Ramdas spent the following months visiting centres of pilgrimage all over India, including Puri, Dakshineswar, Kashi, Haridwar, Rishikesh, Kedarnath, Badrinath, Mathura, and Brindavan; in all these places he was fed, clothed and guided by strangers. After paying his respects at the Muslim shrine of Ajmer Sharif, he moved southwards, visiting Dwaraka and Pandharpur. He then went further south to visit Sri Siddharudha Swami at Hubli. It was here, in 1923, that his family finally tracked him down. His wife and daughter arrived in Hubli, and on Siddharudha Swami's advice, Swami Ramdas returned to Mangalore with Rukmabai and his daughter. But instead of going home with them, he went to the nearby Kadri Hills and started living in the Panch Pandav Cave, where he continued his spiritual practices. It was also in this cave that he wrote his first book, In Quest of God.

=== Further travels: 1923-1928 ===
In his book In the Vision of God Swami Ramdas describes attaining the Jivanmukta state during his stay at the Panch Pandav cave:

For two years from the time of the significant change which had come over him, Ramdas had been prepared to enter into the depths of his being for the realisation of the immutable, calm and eternal spirit of God. Here he had to transcend name, form, thought and will--every feeling of the heart and faculty of the mind. The world had then appeared to him as a dim shadow--a dreamy nothing. The vision then was mainly internal. It was only for the glory of the Atman in his purity, peace and joy as an all-pervading, immanent, static, immortal and glowing spirit. Then a still exalted state came on; his hitherto inner vision projected outward. He would feel as if his soul had expanded like the blossoming of a flower and, by a flash as it were, enveloped the whole universe, embracing all in a subtle halo of love and light. This experience granted him a bliss infinitely greater than he had in the previous state. Now it was that Ramdas began to cry out, "Ram is all, it is He as everybody and everything." With this externalized vision started Ramdas's mission. Its fullness and magnificence was revealed to him during his stay in the Kadri cave, and here the experience became more sustained and continuous.

Swami Ramdas left the cave to start another pilgrimage. The record of his further adventures all over India, published under the title In the Vision of God in 1935, is filled with vividly described characters, some of them occasional fellow-travellers, and most prominently a spiritually-inclined but endearingly fallible young man named Madhav who adopted the name 'Ramcharandas' and insisted on joining Swami Ramdas in his travels. Ramcharandas weaves in and out of the narrative of In the Vision of God until he takes leave of Swami Ramdas for the last time in Srinagar, Kashmir. During this period, Swami Ramdas visited the Vasishtashram or the Vasishta Cave in the Himalayas, where he had a vision of Christ. He also began displaying the siddhis, or spiritual powers, that accompany enlightenment, and attracted large crowds wherever he went.

=== Anandashram, Kasargod: 1928-1931 ===
After several years of wandering, Swami Ramdas settled down on 3 June 1928 in a small Ashram in Kasargod built for him by his devotees; it consisted of a single room and an open verandah. It was here that Krishnabai, his important disciple, met him. A young widow desperate to find a Guru who would give her spiritual liberation, Krishnabai accepted the Ram mantra from Swami Ramdas and began her spiritual journey under his guidance. She began calling Swami Ramdas 'Papa' when she found that Swami Ramdas's daughter addressed him this way; later on, Swami Ramdas became 'Papa' to most of his devotees.

Within a year, Mother Krishnabai—as she would be later known—left her two children in the care of relatives and became a permanent resident of the Ashram in order to complete her spiritual training. The presence of an attractive young woman in the Ashram of a renunciate subjected both Swami Ramdas and Mother Krishnabai to public criticism; the Ashram also lost its initial popularity. Later, Mother Krishnabai would recall this period with wry humour: "When the ashram was started at Kasaragod, people were pouring in everyday, group after group for Bhajans and talks. They were spending hours together with Papa. But when I came to Papa, those people who were so much devoted to him, gradually stayed away and in a short time there used to be none there except Papa, myself and some crows."

Krishnabai, however, persevered, and achieved the state of nirvikalpa samadhi that takes the practitioner beyond all mental concepts and images. Shortly afterwards, strangers entered the ashram at night and attempted to assault her. Though she was not harmed, Swami Ramdas decided to abandon the Ashram that night.

=== Anandashram, Kanhangad: 1931-1963 ===
Go to Anandashram main article

A new ashram, also called 'Anandashram,' was established in Kanhangad by Swami Ramdas's devotees on 15 May 1931. This would be Swami Ramdas's main abode for the rest of his life. The Ashram continues its work of helping local people and spreading Swami Ramdas's message of universal love and service.

Around 1950, another ashram named 'Ramdas Ashram' was founded in Swami Ramdas's honour by Gunvantrai T. Kamdar in Bhavnagar, Gujarat. Until he stopped travelling due to poor health, Swami Ramdas spent a couple of months here every year; during the rest of the year, this Ashram hosted other famous saints.

In 1954, Swami Ramdas went on a world tour, visiting Europe, the United States, and East and South-East Asia. His book World Is God (1955) offers an account of this trip. World Is God forms the third and last instalment of Swami Ramdas's autobiography, the other two being In Quest of God (1925) and In the Vision of God (1935).

In World Is God, Swami Ramdas gives a description of his state at the time:

Ramdas’ life has no future, as it has transcended time and space. It has nothing new to achieve or attain. It is one with Cosmic Reality. Birth and death have nothing to do with it. Eternal stillness and eternal movement are its centre and circumference—the centre fixed in eternity and circumference encompassing infinity; boundless existence reduced to a point and a point expanded beyond all conceivable limitations. … Thus Ramdas’ life is resounding with the music of Eternity. Its sweet strain is never-ending. It is a divine symphony of sublime serenity, calmness and peace that is ineffable, harmonised with spontaneous activity embodying the spirit of Universal Love and Service. Waves and waves of Bliss rise from it to dance on the bosom of Satchidanand and lose themselves within itself. Its creation is destruction, its beginning its own end. A resonant Silence! That is Ramdas!

Swami Ramdas died on 25 July 1963. A shrine, or samadhi mandir, was constructed at his cremation site within Anandashram.

Swami Ramdas' known disciples include Mataji Krishnabai, Swami Satchidananda, Swami Muktananda, and Yogi Ramsuratkumar. He also influenced many other spiritual seekers including the musician and writer Dilip Kumar Roy, the American mystic Mildred Hamilton, Maurice Frydman aka Swami Bharatananda, and Swami Chidananda Saraswati of the Divine Life Society.

== Philosophy ==
=== On Religion ===
Swami Ramdas did not discriminate between religions. He writes: "Ramdas does not belong to any particular creed. He believes that all creeds, faiths and religions are different paths which converge to the same goal. The sight of a Muhammadan reminds him of Muhammad; of a Christian, Jesus Christ; of a Hindu, Rama, Krishna or Shiva; and of a Buddhist, Buddha; of a Parsee, Zoroaster. All the great teachers of the world are from one God--the first eternal cause of all existence. Whether it be in the Gita or the Bible or the Koran or the Zend Avesta, we find the same note ringing, viz., self-surrender is the supreme way to liberation or salvation."

=== On "Sri Ram" ===
When asked if the 'Sri Ram' that he referred to was different from Sri Ram, the son of Dasaratha and the Avatar described in the Ramayana, Swami Ramdas replied: "Ramdas will answer you in Kabir’s words. He was also asked the same question. He said, ‘My Ram is the great Truth, Impersonal, dwelling in the hearts of all beings and creatures in the universe. My Ram is the all-pervading, immanent and all-transcendent Reality. My Ram has assumed the forms of all beings and things and my Ram is Dasaratha’s son also. My Ram is the all-inclusive and all-transcendent Supreme Godhead.’”

=== On Ashrams and Institutions ===
Swami Ramdas believed that all spiritual norms and institutions were useful only up to a point. He stated: “When the false conventions and ostentatious observations are broken through, the soul is liberated. For realizing the Truth no external paraphernalia is necessary. No garb, no sign, no cult and no creed can help you. The day will come when you have to leave all these behind, and go to meet the Eternal in the perfect nakedness of your Spirit, shedding all make-believe forms, customs and traditions. Simplicity, spontaneity and humility become the guiding principles of your life. You move freely with all. You love all alike. You break the boundaries set by the calculating human mind. You soar like a free bird in the infinite expanse of the spiritual firmament. You look upon all beings and creatures as the embodiment of the one divine all-pervading Spirit. Temples, Ashrams, mosques, churches, synagogues, Viharas, etc., cannot imprison your soul. You find your soul’s delight and joy in all places—in the best as well as the worst.”

== Bibliography ==
A selected list of books authored by Swami Ramdas:

- In Quest of God (1925)
- At the Feet of God (1928)
- Krishna Bai (1932)
- Gita Sandesh: Message of the Gita (c. 1933; the link is to the Bharatiya Vidya Bhavan edition of 1966), https://archive.org/details/GeetaSandeshMessageOfTheGitaSwamiRamdas/page/n15/mode/2up
- The Divine Life (1934)
- In the Vision of God (1935)
- Glimpses of Divine Vision (1944)
- Letters of Swami Ramdas (2 Volumes, 1946)
- World Is God (1955)
- Hints to Aspirants (1959)
- Stories as Told by Swami Ramdas (1961)
- God Experience (2 Volumes, 1975)

== Quotations ==
People do not know what the Name of God can do. Those who repeat it constantly alone know its power. It can purify our mind completely... The Name can take us to the summit of spiritual experience.

— Swami Ramdas

Place yourself as an instrument in the hands of God who does his own work in his own way.

— Swami Ramdas

Just as a flower gives out its fragrance to whomsoever approaches or uses it, so love from within us radiates towards everybody and manifests as spontaneous service.

— Swami Ramdas

== See also ==
- Nama sankeerthanam
- Rama
- Anandashram
- Ramana Maharshi
- Aurobindo
- Bhagawan Nityananda
- Neem Karoli Baba
- Anandamayi Ma
- Haidakhan Babaji
- Jiddu Krishnamurti
- Nisargadatta Maharaj
