= Mavungal =

- Town
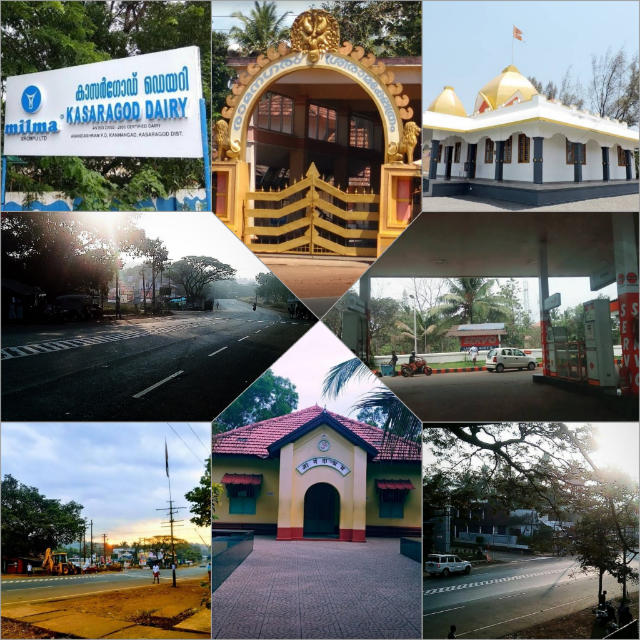
- Left to right: Milma Kasaragod Dairy Plant, Sree Ram Temple Mavungal, Veera Maruti Temple, NH, Petrol pump, Panathoor Road, Anandashram, NH

- Location in Kerala, India Mavungal (India)
- Coordinates: 12°20′19″N 75°06′20″E
- Country: India
- State: Kerala
- District: Kasaragod

Government
  - Type: Municipality
  - Body: Kanhangad Municipality
- Time zone: UTC+5:30 (IST)
- PIN: 671531
- Telephone code: 467
- Vehicle registration: KL 60, KL 14
- Taluk: Hosdurg
- Lok Sabha constituency: Kasaragod

Mavungal is a town in Kerala, India, situated just 3 km away from the city of Kanhangad. Mavungal is one of the busiest transport hubs in Kasaragod district. It connects Kasaragod on the north, Kannur on the south, Kanhangad on the west and hill towns Panathur, Sullia and Madikeri on the east, making it one of the major junction in the region.

== Healthcare ==
- Sanjeevani Institute of Medical Science

== Places of Interest ==
- The famous Anandashram, Kanhangad is situated in Mavungal. The junction also has a Transport Bus depot.

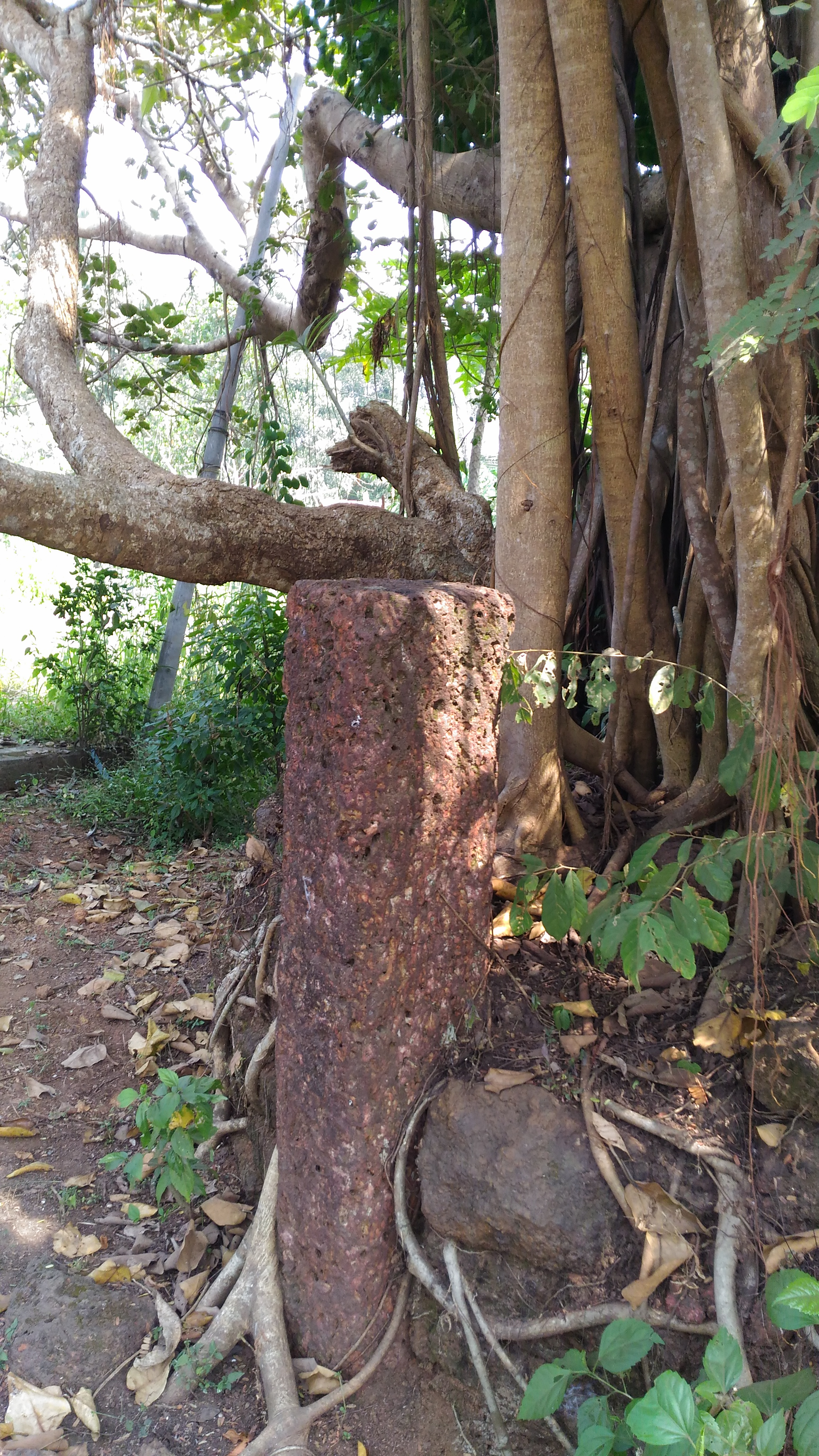
Chumaduthangi red stone

- Manjampothikunnu Hill has sights over the Arabian Sea and Western Ghats.
