= District Educational Office =

Type of educational organization in India

- Type: State Governmental Board of School Education
- Headquarters: District of State
- Location: District
- Official language: Official regional language, English, and Hindi

District Education Office is responsible for monitoring educational, administrative and legal activities for schools in districts under the Department of Education, Government of India. As of 2012 the office monitored mandals with government schools and private schools serving more than lakhs students. Two offices are appointed in each district.

- District Education Office (Secondary Education)
- District Education Office (Elementary Education)
