= Madikai =

- Panchayat
- Location in Kerala, India Madikai (India)
- Coordinates: 12°19′40″N 75°9′0″E
- Country: India
- State: Kerala
- District: Kasaragod

Population (2011)
  - Total: 12,930

Languages
  - Official: Malayalam, English
- Time zone: UTC+5:30 (IST)
- Vehicle registration: KL-
- Nearest city: Kanhangad & Nileshwar
- Lok Sabha constituency: Kasaragod
- Vidhan Sabha constituency: Hosdurg

Madikai is a Grama Panchayat in Hosdurg taluk, Kasaragod district in the state of Kerala, India. The wards of Madikai panchayat are Vazhakode, Achikanam, Vellachery, Alambadi, Kanhirapoyil, Malappachery, Cheranathala, Kolikkunnu, Erikulam, Bengalam, Kakkat, Adukathparambu, Chalakadavu, Keekkamkottu and Ambalakuthara. The largest junction in Madikai Panchayat is Kanhirapoil and Erikkulam. Ambalathara, Chalakadavu and Bangalam are the next largest.

== Demographics ==
As of the 2011 Indian census, Madikai had a population of 12930, split into 6099 males and 6831 females.

== Transportation ==
Local roads have access to National Highway 66 which connects to Mangalore in the north and Kannur in the south. The two nearest railway stations are Kanhangad & Nileshwar in Mangalore, both on the palakkad line. There are two international airports north of Madikai - Mangalore International Airport and in Kannur International Airport.
