= Kanhangad =

- City
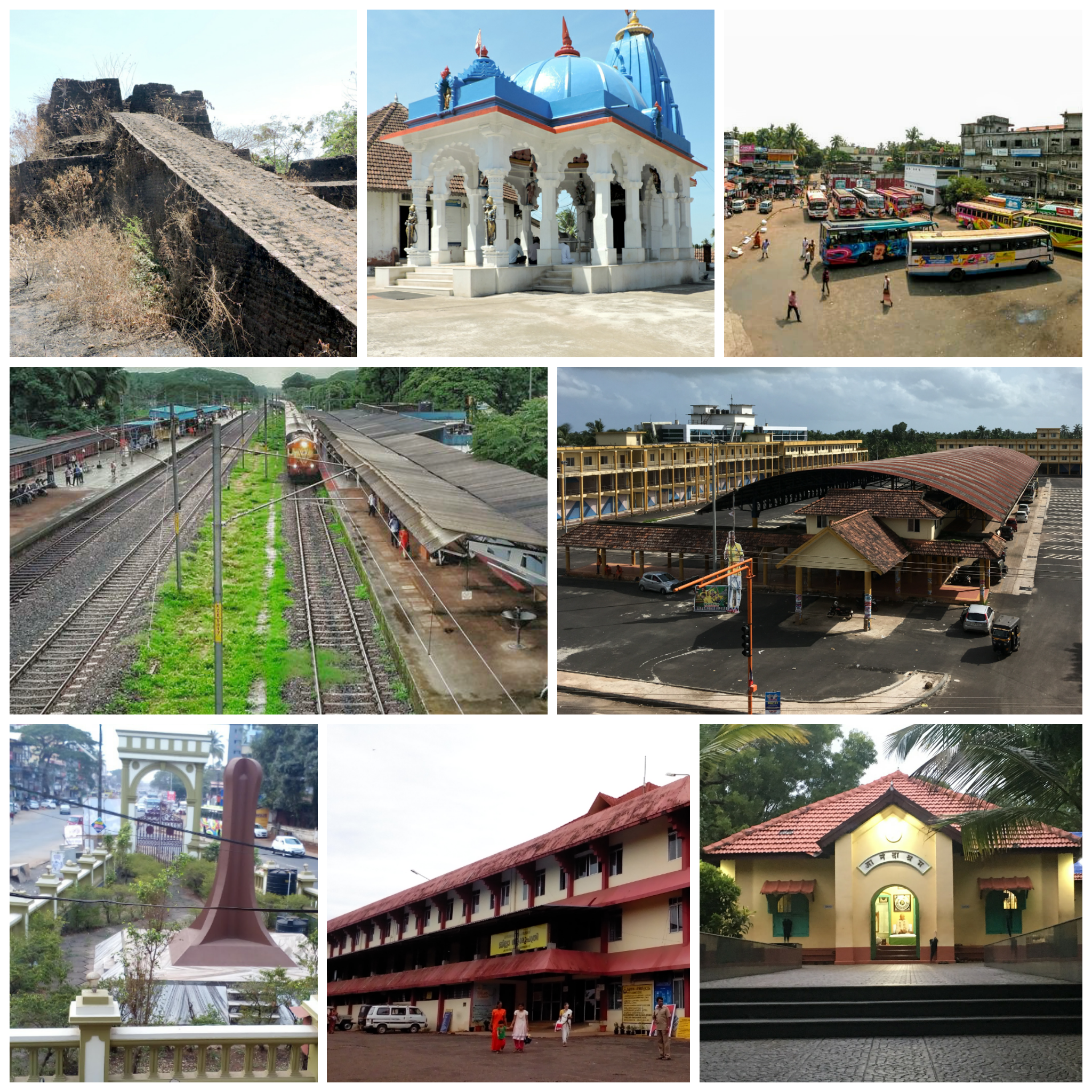
- Left to right: Hosdurg Fort, Nityananda Ashram, Old Bus Stand, Railway Station, New Bus Stand, Gandhi Smriti Mandapam, Government District Hospital, Anandashram

- Location in Kerala, India Kanhangad (India)
- Coordinates: 12°18′0″N 75°5.4′0″E
- Country: India
- State: Kerala
- District: Kasaragod
- Taluk: Hosdurg
- Municipality Established: 1984

Government
  - Type: Municipal Council
  - Body: Kanhangad Municipality
  - Municipal Chairperson: V. V Rameshan (CPIM)
  - Deputy Chairperson: A.D. Latha (INL)
  - Loksabha Member: Rajmohan Unnithan
  - MLA: E. Chandrasekharan

Area
  - City: 70.47 km^{2} (27.21 sq mi)
  - Metro: 139.8 km^{2} (54.0 sq mi)

Population (2011)
  - City: 125,564
  - Density: 1,782/km^{2} (4,615/sq mi)
  - Metro: 229,706
- Demonym(s): Kanhangadukaran (Male), Kanhangadukari (Female), Kanhangadukar (Plural)

Languages
  - Official: Malayalam, English
- Time zone: UTC+5:30 (IST)
- PIN: 671315
- Telephone code: 467
- ISO 3166 code: IN-KL
- Vehicle registration: KL-60
- Sex ratio: 1000:1150 ♂/♀
- Literacy: 92.6%
- Civic agency: Kanhangad Municipality
- Lok Sabha constituency: Kasaragod
- Vidhan Sabha constituency: Kanhangad
- Website: kanhangadmunicipality.lsgkerala.gov.in/en

Kanhangad (Malayalam: [kaːɲːɐŋːaːɖɨ̆]) is a city and municipality, located in the Kasaragod district, state of Kerala, India. It is the most populous city in Kasaragod district.

== Location ==
The area contains villages around Kanhangad town with Kasaragod as the northern border, Nileshwar, popularly known as the 'cultural town' of Kasaragod district with its rich rivers and lakes; as the southern boundary. The eastern part of Kanhangad is categorized as Panathur area with the difference in terrain mainly because of the hilly terrain and hill stations and to the West lies the Arabian Sea. The importance of Kanhangad is that it lies in the exact centre between the two major cities Mangalore and Kannur, equidistant from their respective district headquarters.

Map of Kanhangad Municipality

== Geography ==
Kanhangad lies at 12°18′0″N 75°5.4′0″E in the geographic map of Kasaragod. It is a coastal town which has a varied topography with plain areas in the centre of the city. The landscape is dominated by the characteristic coconut palms accompanying rolling hills and streams flowing into the sea. In the East, there are hilly areas of Madikai . The western region has powdered sand and a mix of laterite and alluvial soil in the areas between. The hilly areas typically consists of red sand.

The Arabian Sea lies in the west and the Western Ghats in the east. The Neeleshwaram River originates from the Kinanoor Hills, passes south through Arangadi and drains into the Nileshwar.

== Etymology ==
As cited in the Vadakkan Paattu or the North Malabar folklore songs, there was a temple in the name of Kanjiram Kaattappan and through this the name Kanjangad was derived. Another popular belief is that it was derived out of Kānjiramkād which means a forest of Strychnine tree. As per historic records, the place was ruled by Kanjan, a tribal representative of Kolathiri which later came to be known as Kanjante naad which means 'land of Kanjan' in Malayalam; later constricted as Kanhangad. There is also another legend that the name was derived from a Sanskrit word Kanchanaghatta.

== History ==
It was cited in old folklore that the area of Kanhangad was under the reign of king Nanda Raja of Mushaka Rajya, headquartered in Ezhimala Kannur region during the Sangam period. The historic region was known as Poozhinadu and later Paduvanadu. However, the history of Kanhangad can be clearly understood only by the 8th century. During this period the area was a part of the 2nd Chera Dynasty. The illustrations of a Chera King, Bhaskaran Ravi Varman II obtained from Pullur shows the political sovereignty of the Chera Kingdom in this region.

Later, when Kolathunadu of Kolathiri dynasty from Kannur administered the region, Kolathiri appointed Kanhan as the baron of the region. So the name Kanhante Naadu, meaning 'Kanhan's Province' contracted to Kanhangad.

Due to the collapse of the Kolathiri Dynasty, the reign of Elamkoor came to an end and the powerful elite barons renowned as Ettadukkal lords gained the strength. Among them, the mightiest was Allohalan, whose reign was concentrated around Madiyan Kovilakam. With the help of the Zamorin, Kolathiri has assassinated him and established a new dynasty at Neeleswaram headquarters. Earlier Kanhangad was a crucial port in all sense. Hence the Vijayanagara kings attacked Kanhangad too during their conquest of Tulu Nadu. After the fall of the Vijayanagara dynasty, the Ikkeri Kings have been attacking this area since the 1630s.

Since Kanhangad became a part of Nileshwaram kingdom following the reign of the Kolathunadu, the land witnessed frequent conflicts between Nileshwaram kingdom and Ikkeri Nayaks of Bednore. When the Ikkeri Nayaks defeated the Nileshwaram kingdom, the region came under the Keladi Nayaka Kingdom. In 1713 Somashekara Nayaka constructed a new fort to resist further attacks from Nileshwaram kingdom. The fort is now known as Puthiyakotta or Hosdurg, meaning 'New Fort' in Malayalam and Kannada respectively.

In the 1760s Haidar Ali captured the land from Ikkeri Nayaks and the region came under the Mysore Kingdom which was later merged with the south Kanara district. In 1799, soon after the death of Tipu Sultan the entire region came under the control of East India Company. Till 1862, Kanhangad was in Bekal Taluk under Bombay Presidency. On 15 April 1862 when the Dakshina Kannada region shifted to Madras Presidency, the region came under Kasaragod taluk. After the formation of Kerala State, Kasaragod taluk was divided and Kanhangad came under Hosdurg taluk on 1 January 1957.

== Politics ==
Kanhangad was an important centre of the Indian National movement. The Congress Working Committee joined at Kanhangad on 1 January 1925 and decided to launch a massive Khadi centre. It has given good direction to the freedom struggle in addition to the increase in the enthusiasm which the promotion of Khaadi had. In January 1925, the Hosdurg unit of the Indian National Congress was formed. AC Kannan Nair was the first President and KT Kunhiraman Nambiar was the first Secretary.

Many members of the Janmis or Noblemen and ordinary people from this region attended the Simon Commission for boycotting and Civil Disobedience movement. In April 1926, Vidwan P. Kelu Nair setup the Vighyanadayini National Sanskrit School in Vellikoth (Bellikoth) to promote National education. Later the school became the main centre of the National Movement in the region. The prominent Congress leaders like AC Kannan Nair, KT Kunhiraman Nambiar, Damodara Bhaktan, Vidwan P Kelunayar and E Raghava Panikkar were the teachers in this school. Keralite K. Madhavan and Gandhi Krishnan Nair were students here.

They attended the State Congress Conference held at Payyannur on 26 and 27 May in 1928 and K. Madhavan participated in it as a volunteer. In 1930, five people participated in the Salt Satyagraha protest under the leadership of K. Kelappan. There was active participation of people from Kanhangad in the 1921 Guruvayoor Satyagraha and the 1942 Quit India Movement.

AC. Kannan Nair who was the Congress president of Hosdurg Thaluk in 1925 has fought against untouchability. He also started the Vallabhai Library in Kottacherry which helped the National movement a lot in the region. The prominent leaders who participated in the Indian freedom struggle from Kanhangad include Vidwan P. Kelu Nair, who has a high graduation in Sanskrit language, Gandhi Krishnan Nair, who lost his eyes during Toddy shop picketing, H. Vasudev who has worked in National Movement since a young age, Damodara Shenoy, K. Madhavan, who participated in the Salt Satyagraha, Achyutha Shenoy who was tortured by Police for participating in the Quit India Movement, editors of Shakti Magazine, and K.T Kunhiraman Nambiyar who was famous as a person who was the volunteer captain of the Kerala Congress Conference in 1926.

=== Post Independence ===
Hosdurg area was a sub-taluk of Kasaragod taluk. This information was recorded in the first censorship after independence in 1951. Following the linguistic state reorganization, Kasaragod taluk was split from the southern Karnataka region and was merged with Malabar district and the state of Kerala was formed on 1 November 1956. On 1 November 1957, Malabar was divided into 3 districts of Kannur, Kozhikode and Palakkad. The division of Kasaragod and Hosdurg Taluk were under Kannur district.

The Kasaragod district came into being on 24 May 1984 and Kanhangad municipality was formed in June 1984. On 28 May 2013, Kasaragod Taluk was divided into Kasaragod and Manjeswaram taluks and Hosdurg taluk were split into Hosdurg and Vellarikundu taluks.

=== Assembly ===
==== Loksabha ====
Kanhangad is a part of the Kasaragod constituency which extends from Manjeshwaram in Kasaragod district to Kalliasseri in Kannur district. Rajmohan Unnithan of the Indian National Congress party is currently representing the Kasaragod constituency since May, 2019.

==== State Assembly ====
Kanhangad's assembly constituency (Number 4) is a part of the Kasaragod (Lok Sabha constituency). E. Chandrasekharan of Left Democratic Front is the current MLA and also the former Revenue Minister of Kerala.

== Administration ==
Kanhangad which was initially a special grade panchayat was upgraded to a Municipality on 1 June 1984. Kanhangad is a subdistrict in Kasaragod district and the Kanhangad Municipality is in charge of the civic and infrastructural assets of the city. The Kasargod district is divided into two Revenue divisions, Kasargod division in the north and Kanhangad division is the south respectively. It has two Taluks under it namely Hosdurg and Vellarikundu. The two municipalities Kanhangad and Nileshwar, out of the three in the district comes under the Hosdurg Taluk which has a total of 29 villages under it. After the inauguration of Mini Civil Station, the old Taluk office building which was constructed during the time of British was renovated as a historic monument. Under the local self-government, Kanhangad block has a total of 5 Panchayats.

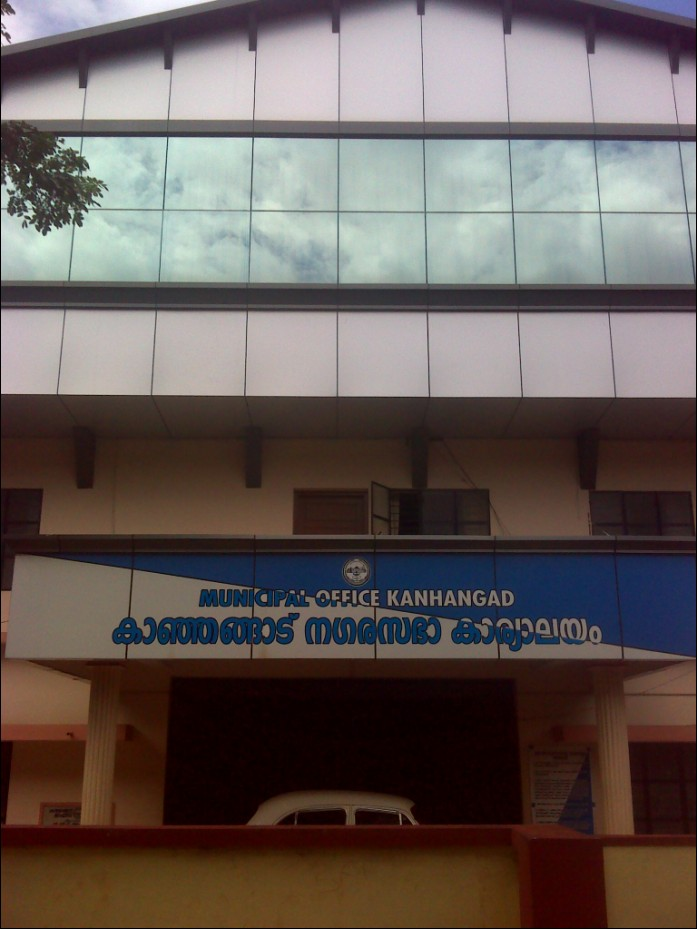
Kanhangad Municipality Office

A part of northern Kanhangad, Ajanur is a bureaucratic nicety and a Census town. Some parts of Kanhangad town is put under an administrative unit called Ajanur Panchayath. The suburb continues to be part and parcel of Kanhangad city.

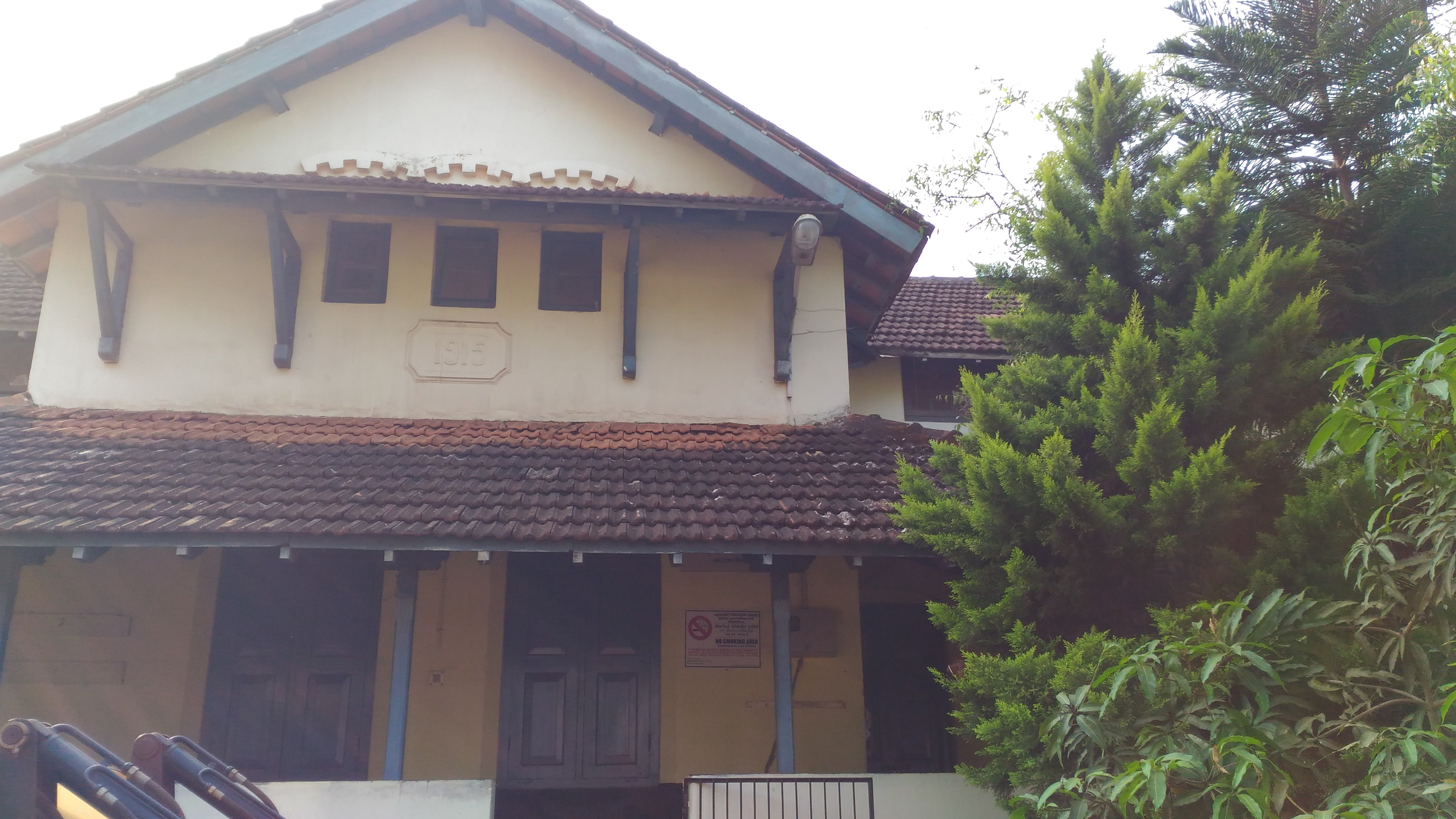
Old Hosdurg Taluk Office building

The entire administrative area of Kanhangad lies in Hosdurg or Puthiyakotta. It includes all administrative units and offices like Municipality office, Taluk Office, Judicial Magistrate Court, Mini Civil Station, Police station, Fire station, District Educational Office, District Medical Office, Regional Transport Office, Revenue Divisional Office, District Homeopathy Hospital, Government Veterinary clinic and so on.

== Demographics ==
As of 2011 Census, Kanhangad Municipality and Outgrowths had a total population of 125,564. Males constitute 46.6% of the population and females 53.4%. Kanhangad Municipality+Outgrowth spreads over an area of 70.47 km^{2} (27.21 sq mi) with 27,579 families residing in it. Kanhangad had an average literacy rate of 92.6%, higher than the national average of 74.04% and lower than state average of 94.00%; male literacy was 96.17%, and female literacy was 89.56%. In Kanhangad, 11.5% of the population was under 6 years of age. There are 7,425 male children and 7,063 female children between the age 0–6 years. Thus, the child sex ratio of Kanhangad is 951 which is less than the state average sex ratio (1,144).

Kanhangad city religious data (2011)
Religions	Percent
Hinduism	64.50%
Islam	33.08%
Christianity	2.01%

== Economy ==
Agriculture and fishing are the primary sources of income for residents of the region. The soil and topography allow for a diverse selection of crops: Rubber, pepper, cashew and ginger are the important crops that are grown in the eastern part of the region, which comprises forests and hilly areas. In the coastal areas are grown: coconut, rice and tobacco.

Since the oil boom of the ’80s, young people have migrated to the oil-producing Gulf countries in pursuit of lucrative job opportunities. This has considerably changed the economic situation and lifestyle of the residents. Many families depend on money sent home by family members working in the Gulf and other regions. Kanhangad had a larger diaspora in the Gulf countries. The remittance from these countries supported the economic activities a lot. (See Kerala Gulf diaspora).

The laterite (Cheadi) and red soil which is found in the Kanhangad and the surrounding areas are excavated and processed for export. The best quality cashews in Kerala are cultivated in Kanhangad. This industry has been able to secure a lot of foreign exchange by exporting it. One of the largest public sector enterprise in Kanhangad is the China Clay Factory in Vazhunnoradi. Now the government has plans to start a Cashew liquor factory and the first ever meat processing plant and college in India here.

== Climate ==
Kanhangad experiences a Tropical monsoon climate under the Köppen climate classification. The southwest monsoon begins towards the end of May, or the beginning of June, brought about by the monsoon clouds from the Arabian Sea heralded by thunderstorms, and lasts till September. October brings in the northeast monsoon typically begins with drizzling and later with heavy rainfall. Dry weather sets in by the end of December which brings the Winter. January and February are the coolest months of the year. March marks the beginning of Summer apparently April and May being very hot.

Climate data for Kanhangad, Kerala
Month	Jan	Feb	Mar	Apr	May	Jun	Jul	Aug	Sep	Oct	Nov	Dec	Year
Mean daily maximum °C (°F)	31.5 (88.7)	31.7 (89.1)	32.5 (90.5)	32.9 (91.2)	32.4 (90.3)	29.4 (84.9)	28.2 (82.8)	28.5 (83.3)	29.1 (84.4)	30.2 (86.4)	31.1 (88.0)	31.5 (88.7)	30.8 (87.4)
Mean daily minimum °C (°F)	21.8 (71.2)	22.9 (73.2)	24.4 (75.9)	25.8 (78.4)	25.8 (78.4)	23.9 (75.0)	23.5 (74.3)	23.7 (74.7)	23.7 (74.7)	23.8 (74.8)	23.3 (73.9)	22.0 (71.6)	23.7 (74.7)
Average precipitation mm (inches)	2 (0.1)	3 (0.1)	5 (0.2)	59 (2.3)	285 (11.2)	984 (38.7)	1,203 (47.4)	606 (23.9)	323 (12.7)	237 (9.3)	81 (3.2)	16 (0.6)	3,804 (149.7)
Source: Climate-Data.org

== Notable people ==
- K. K. Venugopal - Attorney General of India
- Bellikoth Raghunath Shenoy- Economist
- Swami Ramdas - Saint
- P. Kunhiraman Nair - Malayalam Poet
- K. Madhavan - Freedom fighter
- Kanayi Kunhiraman - Sculptor
- C.M. Padmanabhan Nair - Politician
- P. Karunakaran - Politician
- E. Chandrasekharan - Politician
- Kanhangad Ramachandran - Singer
- Vysakh - Director
- Santhosh Echikkanam - Writer
- Dr.Ambikasuthan Mangad - Writer
- Sibi Thomas - Police officer, Actor
- Senna Hegde - Film Director
- Alishan Sharafu - Cricketer

== Media ==
A local news channel called "City channel" that covers local events and news from Kanhangad and nearby places is operating from Kanhangad. It also has news bureaus of major Malayalam news papers namely Mathrubhumi and Malayala Manorama operating from the city and also channels like Kasargod vision, a unit of Kerala Vision. There are also local news papers that are being printed and published from the city like the "Latest". The Vision is a monthly magazine published by the spiritual center Anandashram, in Kanhangad.

TRAI has announced Kanhangad as one of the cities for expansion of radio stations through the third phase pertaining to the introduction of private FM radio channels in 253 new cities/towns each with a population of more than 1 lakh.

== Education ==
With a good literacy rate, Kanhangad is home to many schools and colleges. It has also produced eminent teachers and scholars like P Kunhiraman Nair. Out of the two Education Divisions in the district, Kanhangad DEO has 46 UP schools and 72 High Schools under it; apart from the private schools. The rest of the schools in the district comes under the 'Kasargod Education District' division.

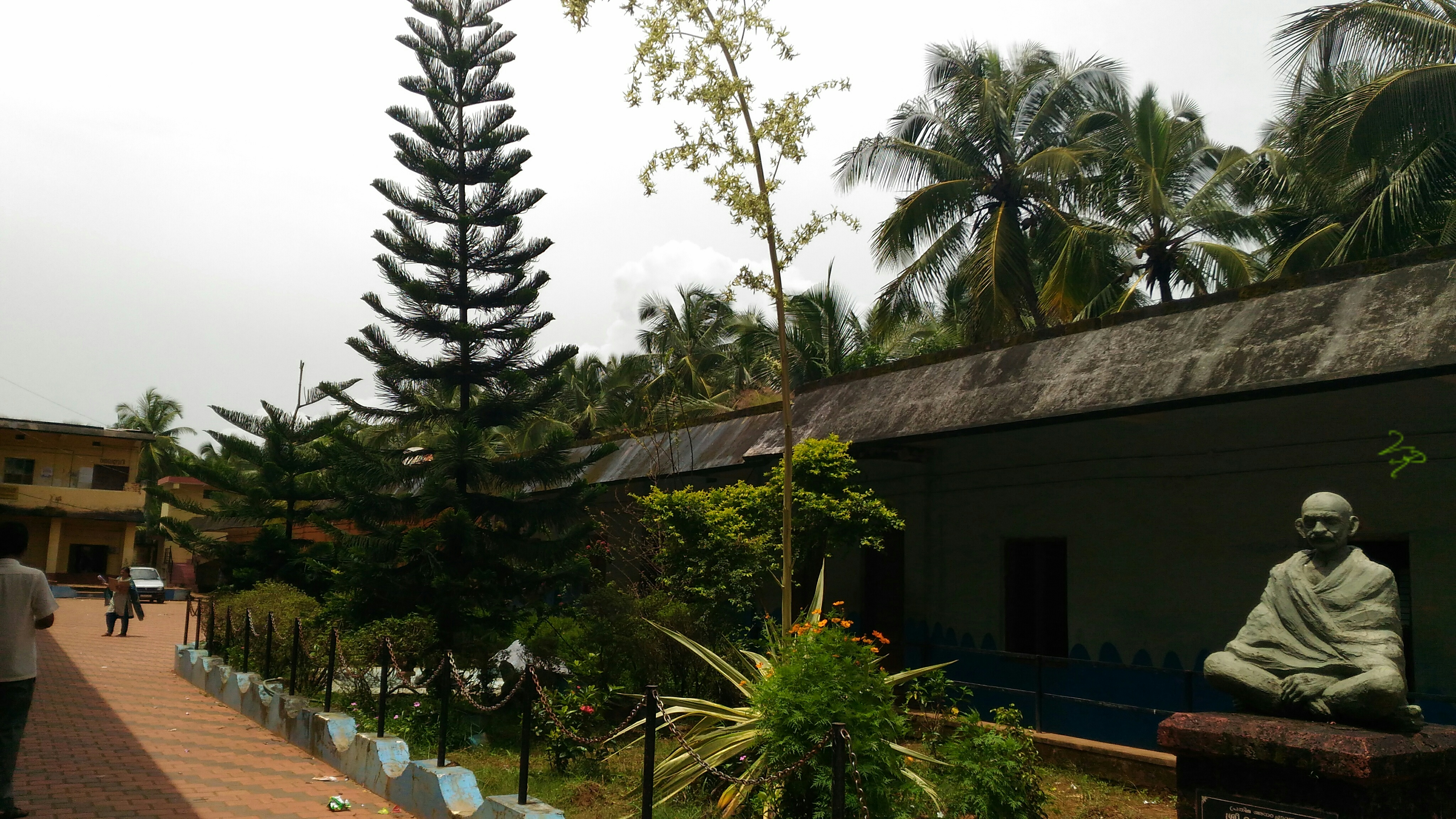
GVHSS Kanhangad

Kanhangad has other prominent institutions like Kendriya Vidyalaya and Navodaya Vidyalaya, located at Periya. Periya also has a campus of the Central University of Kerala. One of the oldest colleges in the district, Nehru Arts and Science College is a landmark educational institution in the region. The Agricultural University of Kerala at Padannakkad is another notable institution. The Science park at Chemmatamvayal is a place of importance for the school children. There is a Sub centre of the Kerala Civil Services Academy adjacent to it.

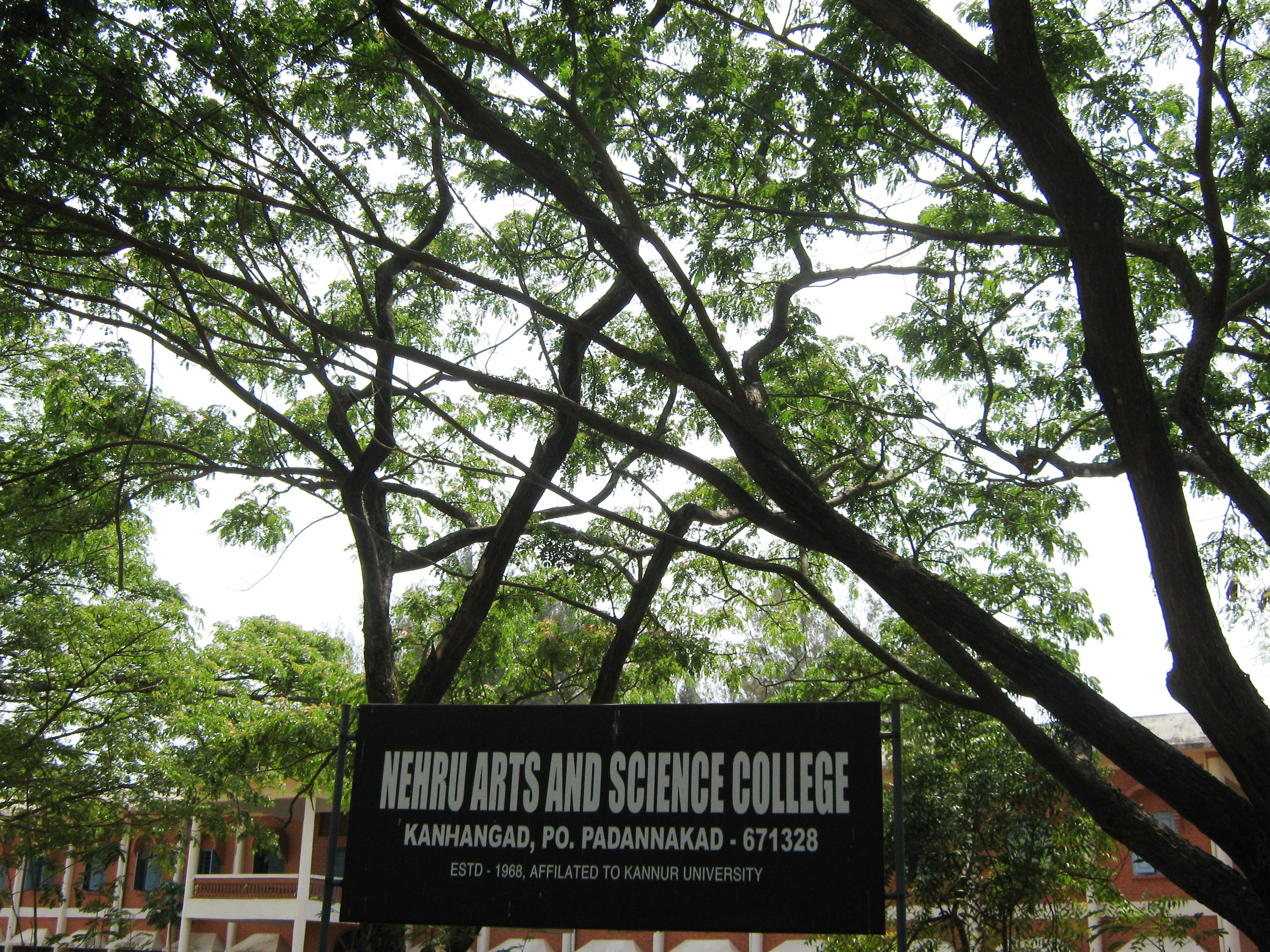
Nehru College

Some of the major educational institutions include:

=== Colleges ===
- Central University of Kerala
- College of Agriculture, Padannakad
- Nehru Arts and Science College
- Swami Nithyananda Poly Technic College
- Swami Nithyananda Institute of Technology
- PNPS Ayurveda Medical College
- C. K Nair Management and Arts College
- Sree Narayana College of Management Studies

=== Schools ===
- Jawahar Navodaya Vidyalaya
- Kendriya Vidyalaya
- Durga Higher Secondary School
- Chinmaya Vidyalaya
- Christ CMI Public School

== Literature ==
The face of literature in Kanhangad is P. Kunhiraman Nair who was a Malayalam poet and teacher. There is a memorial and public reading room at Kanhangad in remembrance of the poet and also being a native of Kasaragod, he spent a greater part of his life teaching at the Raja's High School at Kollengode, where his memorial was set up as a prominent centre of Kerala's art and culture.

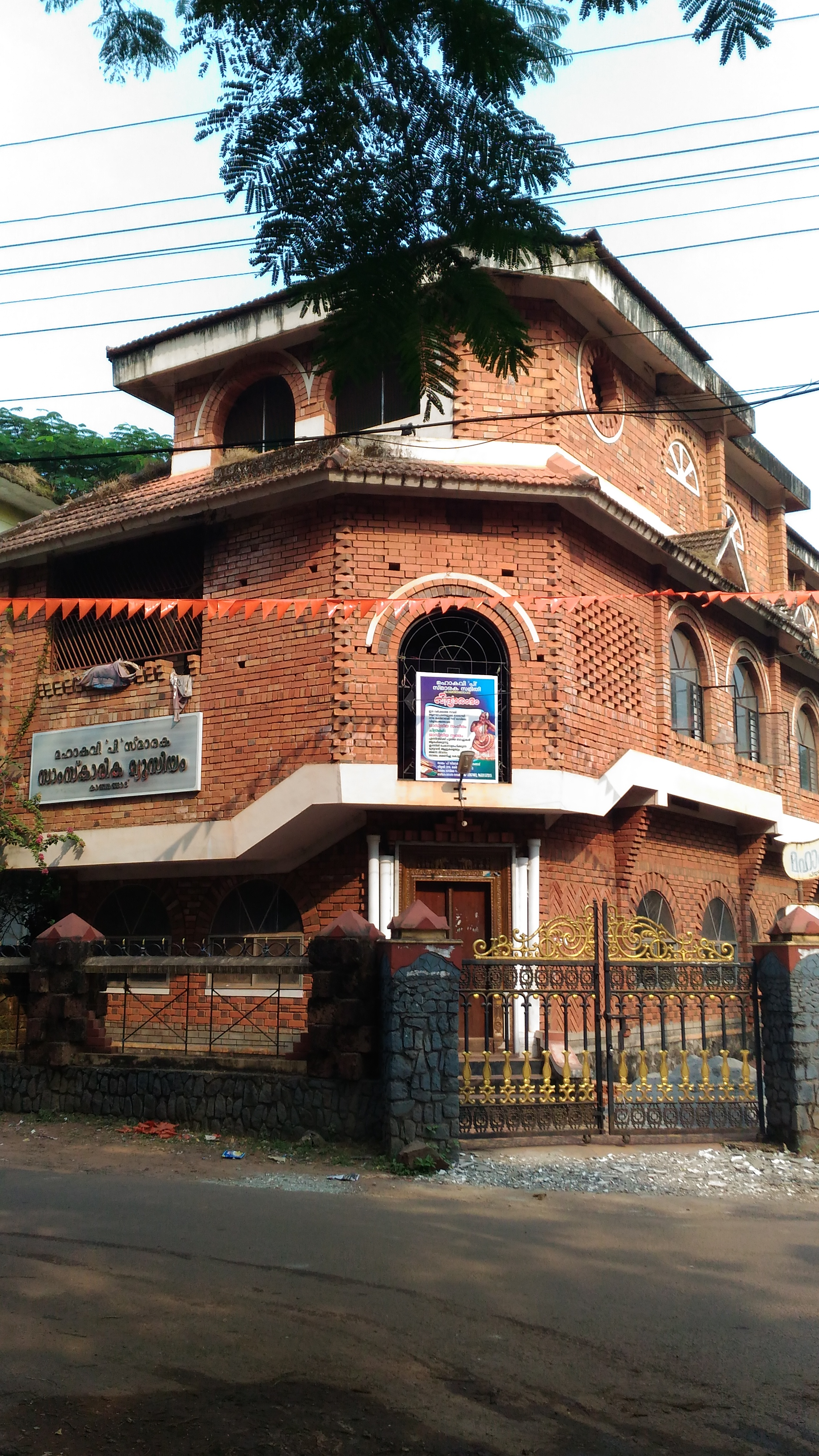
P. Smaraka Mandiram

Kanhangad has also produced other notable authors too like P.V Kunhikkannan who is popularly known with his pen name P. V. K. Panayal who has even won the Kerala Sahithya Akademi Award, Santhosh Echikkanam and Dr. Ambikasuthan Mangad.

== Transportation ==
=== Road ===
Kanhangad is well connected to Kannur, Kozhikode, Kasaragod, Madikeri and Mangalore through Road. NH-66 (previously known as NH-17), which runs from Panvel (in Maharashtra) to Kanyakumari (in Tamil Nadu), passes through Mavungal which is 3 km east to Kanhangad town in a north–south direction and connects with Kasaragod, Mangalore, Udupi, etc. in north and Kannur, Kochi, Thiruvananthapuram, etc. in the south. SH 57, a 29.0 km State Highway connects Kasaragod to Kanhangad via Bekal and Udma in the north and it merges with the NH-66 at Kanhangad south. Kanhangad is connected to Madikeri, Coorg, Mysuru and Bangalore via Kanhangad - Panathur - Madikeri Highway which is planned to be upgraded as National Highway. NH-66 meets with Kanhangad-Panathur-Madikeri Highway and forms a junction in Mavungal. Kanhangad has one of the Regional Transport Offices in the district with KL60 registration. (See List of RTO districts in Kerala)

=== Rail ===
Kanhangad Railway Station is one of the railway stations that lies in the Shoranur - Mangalore Section of the Southern Railways. The station comes under A - category stations of Palakkad Division.

The proposed railway line between Kanhangad and Kaniyuru which connects Bangalore is under review. If implemented, Kanhangad station will be upgraded as a Railway Junction and a special train service from Kanhangad to Bangalore will be a major push for the station and this will also accelerate the development of the city and entire North Malabar region.

=== Air ===
Mangalore International Airport, Bajpe at a distance of 85.7 km and Kannur International Airport at a distance of 89.4 km are the nearest airports from Kanhangad via NH66.

A proposed Air Strip at Periya is under review which if materialised will ensure a never before domestic air transport that will boost the tourism sector in the region.

=== Waterway ===
The government has plans to introduce a waterway from Kovalam to Bekal. Proximity of Kanhangad with Nileshwar too increases the significance of the region.

== See also ==
- Ajanur
- Anandashram
- Kasaragod
- Mangalore
- Mavungal
- Nileshwaram
- Panathur
- Pullur
