= Maloth, Kasaragod =

Maloth Malom
- village
- Nickname: The Land of Hills
- Location in Kerala, India Maloth (India)
- Coordinates: 12°22′0″N 75°21′0″E
- Country: India
- State: Kerala
- District: Kasaragod
- Taluk: Vellarikundu

Area
  - Total: 58.37 km^{2} (22.54 sq mi)

Population (2011)
  - Total: 14,660
  - Density: 251.2/km^{2} (650.5/sq mi)

Languages
  - Official: Malayalam, English
- Time zone: UTC+5:30 (IST)
- PIN: 671534
- Telephone code: 0467 2247/2248
- Vehicle registration: KL-79, KL-60
- Nearest cities: Kanhangad, Kasaragod, Kannur, Mangalore
- Climate: Moderate (Köppen)
- Website: malom.in

Maloth, also known as Malom, is a hilly village in Kasaragod district of the Indian state of Kerala.

It is situated in the Western Ghats in the Balal Panchayath of Kasaragod district of Kerala. It is a part of the Kasaragod parliament constituency and the Kanhangad assembly constituency (earlier it was in the Hosdurg assembly constituency before the delimitation of assembly constituencies in 2011).

It shares borders with the Karnataka forest. The nearest towns are Kanhangad, Cherupuzha, and Nileshwaram. One can reach Maloth through bus from Kanhangad or from Cherupuzha. Private as well as Kerala State Road Transport Corporation buses plying between Kanhangad and Konnakkad pass through the village.

== Demographics ==
As of 2011 India census, there are total 3,565 families residing. The Maloth village has a population of 14,660 of which 7,285 are males and 7,375 are females.

The population of children with age 0-6 is 1,470 which makes up 10% of total population of village. The literacy rate of Maloth was 88.67%, lower compared to 94.00% for Kerala. The male literacy stands at 91.05%, while female literacy rate was 86.33%.

== Infrastructure ==
Major infrastructure in the area includes rural roads, electricity, drinking water supply facilities and telephone connections. Almost all the rural roads are paved. As a part of the EMS Housing scheme the majority of people living Below Poverty Line are provided with new houses. Major part of the village is electrified. However, the public transport facility does not cover several portions of the village. Almost all residents have mobile phones, but there are places where there is no network range for the mobile operators.

== Malom Town ==
Malom town is the main center of Maloth village. The exact geographic position of the village is 2°22′0″N 75°21′0″E. The town is situated on the Hill Highway (Kerala).

Malom Service Co-operative Bank and kerala Gramin Bank are the main banking institutions. The BSNL telephone exchange is near the mosque. A dairy co-operative society and a public distribution shop are other major public initiatives in the town. Malom post office or Darkas Po, which was earlier situated in Darkas is now shifted to the Cultural Center building near the dairy co-operative society. The post office is in the Extra Departmental (ED) facility of the Postal Department and is under the Vellarikundu main post office. One Government Ayurveda dispensary and a private homeopathic dispensary operate in the town, and Malom has several shops for provisions, teashops, computer centers, studios, chemist shops, Ayurvedic shops etc. The Malom Vrindavan Theater no longer exists. One can hire jeeps/auto rikshaws from here and also get rooms for rent. The Hill Highway passes through Malom.

There are many tourist spots in and around the village. Roman Catholic Christians from South Kerala, especially from Pala and Kottayam, have migrated to Malom since the 1950s. They have established several Catholic churches in and around Malom. The majority of them are farmers and merchants.

Rubber is the main crop, and tapioca, arecanut, cashew, pepper, plantain, ginger, and turmeric are also produced. Price fluctuations in the markets affect the profitability of farming, and the younger generation is generally reluctant to take up farming as their profession for livelihood.

== Education ==
Formal education is offered by Government Higher Secondary School Maloth Kasba. The school is situated in Vallikkadavu. It is one of the biggest schools in Kasaragod district in terms of the number of students. Besides GHSS Maloth Kasba there is the St Savio English Medium School, near the St George Church Vallikkadavu. Jaycees School is another unaided private school. Higher education institutions include government college Elerithattu, St. Pius X College, Rajapuram, Nehru Arts and Science College Kanhangad and Government College Kasaragod, and some students travel to Bangalore, Cochin, and other areas to pursue higher education and nursing courses.

== Adjoining areas ==
The Malom town is in the lap of several adjoining hilly human habitations. The majority of those who reside here are farmers, agricultural laborers and traders. It is a Christian majority area. Other communities include Hindus and Muslims. The ratio of scheduled castes and scheduled tribes to the total population is also significant. Valiya Puncha, Venthamala, Konnakkad, Karuvankayam, Chully, Pullady, Padayankallu are the surrounding areas.The farmers and the merchants have to reach Malom to buy provisions and to sell their agricultural products. All these places are connected with rural roads, but in several places it is yet to be paved. Hence in monsoons it is difficult for villagers to reach Malom.

Valiya Puncha, Pullady, Padayankallu and Venthamala are hilly areas which lie about 500 meters above the sea level. These places share their borders with the Karnataka forest. Elephants and wild boars straying into farming fields from the forests poses serious threat to life and property of farmers residing in these borders. Other surrounding areas are low-lying valley of the peaks in Western Ghats.

=== Pullody ===
Pullody is a hilly area in Maloth village with a high altitude from sea level. The hills are covered with mist and snow, which attracts tourists. This place is near the Kerala-Karnataka border. The Palakolli waterfalls and its estate are very near to this place. St. Alphonsa Catholic Church Pullody is located here. This place is 4 km away from malom town on Malom - Kolichal Hill Highway. There are some bus services to Kanhangad from Pullody, and some jeep trips to Kallar and Kolichal. There are occasional problems with elephants from the nearby Kerala-Karnataka forests, and this is a less populated area, with a population mainly of farmers. Rubber, coconut, and bananas are cultivated here. The majority of the people are Hindus and Christians. Janakeeyam Pullody is a people co-operative jeep service that runs between Pullody and Malom town. This jeep service was established in 2008.

=== Valiya Puncha ===
Valiya Puncha is another hilly area which is situated about 4 km from Malom. One can get Jeep services from Malom to Valiya Puncha. Malom-Mandalam-Kuzhippunam-Cheriya Puncha-Valiyapuncha road passes through the Kerala Forest at Anakuzhi before joining Maikkayam and Konnakkad. However the brief unpaved road stretch from Valiya Puncha to Maikayam makes the journey difficult. There is a government LP School and an ankanvadi in Cheriya Puncha. Cheriya Puncha also accommodates the St. Thomas Church, a Saint Thomas Christian church of the village.

=== Karuvankayam ===
Karuvankayam is known as "lamp of Malom."

== Transportation ==
The Malom town is situated on the Hill Highway (Kerala) which is connected to Karnataka state through bandadka towards north and kannur district towards south. The nearest railway station is Nileshwar railway station on Mangalore-Palakkad line. The nearest airports are Mangalore and kannur

== People from Malom ==
- Shermi Ulahannan, member of the India national kabaddi team (gold medal winners of the at the 2010 Asian Games)

== Near by places ==
Neighbouring Places
