= Kinanoor =

Kinanoor Kinavoor Kinavoor- Karinthalam
- Village
- Location in Kerala, India Kinanoor (India)
- Coordinates: 12°16′45″N 75°11′45″E
- Country: India
- State: Kerala
- District: Kasaragod

Government
  - Type: Panchayati raj (India)
  - Body: Gram panchayat

Area
  - Total: 27.33 km^{2} (10.55 sq mi)

Population (2011)
  - Total: 9,728
  - Density: 355.9/km^{2} (921.9/sq mi)

Languages
  - Official: Malayalam, English
- Time zone: UTC+5:30 (IST)
- Vehicle registration: KL-79

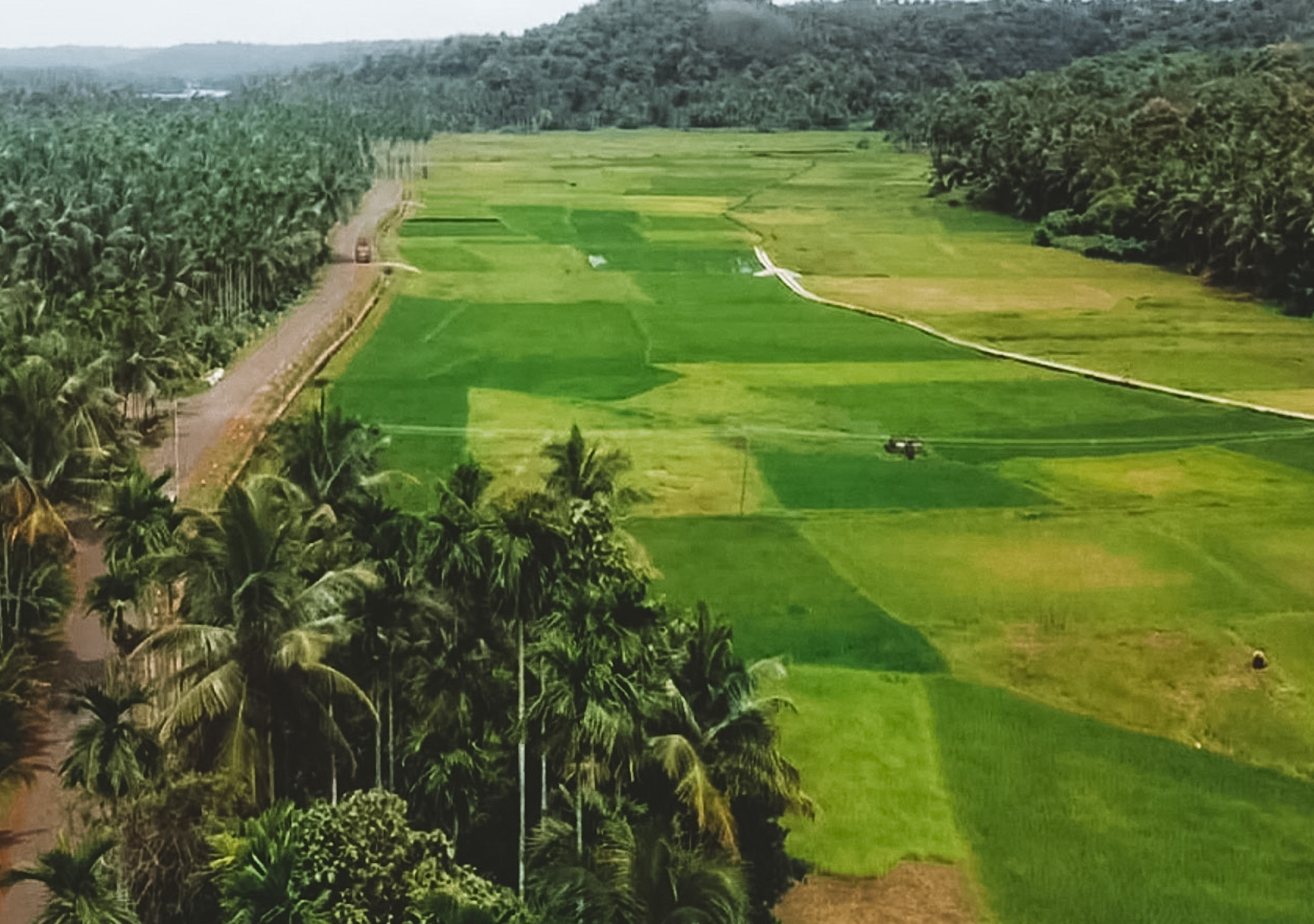
Kinanoor ( Image Taken : Vivek P Kinanoor )

Kinanoor or Kinavoor is an ancient Village capital (Karithalam/Karantholam/ Karinthalam Gramam) situated in Sahya Hill ( Western Ghats ) area of Kasaragod district in the state of Kerala, India.It is situated between Nileshwar and Parappa.

== Demographics ==
As of 2011 Census, Kinavoor now modified as Kinanoor had a population of 9,728 with 4,691 males and 5,037 females. Kinanoor village has an area of 27.33 km^{2} (10.55 sq mi) with 2,517 families residing in it. 8.83% of the population was under 6 years of age. Kinanoor village had an average literacy of 89.2% higher than the national average of 74% and lower than state average of 94%.

== Administration ==
This panchayat is administered as a part of the newly formed Vellarikundu taluk.Earlier it was Hosdurg Taluk. Kinanoor-Karindalam Panchayat is a part of Kanhangad Assembly constituency under Kasaragod Loksabha constituency.

Kinanoor Karinthalam Gramapanchayath won the second prize for water conservation in the National Water Awards 2018 instituted by the MoWRs (category: Best Village Panchayat).

== Transportation ==
The national highway passing through Nileshwaram connects to Mangalore in the north and Kannur in the south. The nearest railway station is Nileshwar on Mangalore-Palakkad line. There are airports at Mangalore and Kannur International Airport

== See also ==
- Bheemanadi
- Cheemeni
- West Eleri
- Kayoor
- Kavvayi
- Pilicode
- Padne
- Kinavoor
