= Chavaragiri =

Hamlet in Kasargod District, Kerala, India

Chavaragiri is a Hamlet in Palavayal Revenue Village of Vellarikund taluk in Kasaragod district of Kerala state, India. It comes under East Eleri Grama Panchayat. It is located 68 km south east of district headquarters Kasaragod, 21 km south east of taluk headquarters Vellarikundu, 9 km south east of panchayat headquarters Chittarikkal, 4 km north of revenue village Palavayal.

== Transport ==
This village is connected to Karnataka state through Panathur. There is a 20 km road from Panathur to Sullia in Karnataka from where Bangalore and Mysore can be easily accessed. Locations in Kerala can be accessed by driving towards the western side. The nearest railway station is Kanhangad railway station on Mangalore-Palakkad line. There are airports at Mangalore and Calicut.

== Closest cities, towns and villages ==
- Kanhangad (51 km)
- Payyanur (41 km)
- Nileshwaram (42 km)
- Cherupuzha (10 km)
- Chittarikkal (9 km)
- Pulingome (4.5 km)
- Palavayal (4 km)
- Thayyeni (3 km)

== History ==
After World War II, a large scale migration of people from Central Travancore especially from Meenachil Thaluk (Palai) to Chavaragiri. The migration continued well into the 1970s and 80s. Many of these migrants were Roman Catholic Christians who had an agricultural background. These people changed the agricultural practices to this area. They introduced cash crops like rubber and daily staples like tapioca to this area.

== Politics ==
Chavaragiri is part of the Kasaragod Lok Sabha constituency and Thrikaripur Assembly constituency. The main political parties in Chavaragiri are the Indian National Congress, Kerala Congress (M) and CPI(M). Congress member Rajmohan Unnithan is the present MP of Kasaragod. Sandeep Varier, INC is the sitting MLA of Thrikaripur.

== Institutions ==
- St.Chvara Church,
- St. Martha Sister's Convent
- Amala Nagar Chapel
- Cultural Centre
- Chavaragiri Traders

== Religious places ==
St. Chvara Church, Chavaragiri, which comes under the Archdiocese of Tellicheri, Kerala. This parish has 138 Catholic families and 760 parishioners. Ward prayer groups, under the guidance of the parish priest and Sisters and conduct prayer meetings once in a month in each ward. The religious house of St. Martha Sisters here functions along with the parish.
