= Parappa (Kasaragod) =

Village in Kerala, India

- Village, Block Panchayat
- Location in Kerala, India Parappa (India)
- Coordinates: 12.3714°N 75.2450°E
- Country: India
- State: Kerala
- District: Kasaragod
- Taluk: Vellarikundu

Government
  - Type: Panchayati raj (India)
  - Body: Block Panchayat

Area
  - Total: 40.22 km^{2} (15.53 sq mi)

Population (2011)
  - Total: 14,137
  - Density: 351.5/km^{2} (910.4/sq mi)

Languages
  - Official: Malayalam, English
- Time zone: UTC+5:30 (IST)
- PIN: 671533
- Telephone code: 04672
- Vehicle registration: KL-79

Parappa is a village and block panchayat in Vellarikundu taluk of Kasaragod district in the Indian state of Kerala.

== Location ==
Parappa is located 7 km west of Vellarikundu on Odayanchal-Cherupuzha road, 24 km east of Kanhangad and 44 km south east of District headquarters Kasaragod.

== Administration ==
Local bodies in Kasaragod district

Parappa is a village in Balal Grama Panchayat. The Parappa Block Panchayat consists of 7 Grama Panchayats, including Balal, East Eleri, Kallar, Kinanoor-Karindalam, Kodom-Belur, Panathady and West Eleri. Parappa village is politically a part of Kanhangad (State Assembly constituency) which belongs to Kasaragod (Lok Sabha constituency).

== Demographics ==
As of 2011 Census, Parappa village had total population of 14,137 which constitutes 6,834 males and 7,303 females. Parappa village spreads over an area of 40.22 km^{2} (15.53 sq mi) with 3,463 families residing in it. The sex ratio of Parappa was 1068 lower than state average of 1084. Population in the age group 0-6 was 1,542 (10.9%) where 793 are males and 749 are females. Parappa had overall literacy of 88.3%, lower than state average of 94%. Male literacy stands at 92.1% and female literacy was 84.8%.
