= Thayannur =

Thayannur may refer to:

- Thayanur, Tiruchirappalli district, India.
- Thayannur, Kasaragod district, India.
