= Kumaran =

Kumaran may refer to:

- Kumaran (surname), an Indian surname
- Kumaran, Bangladesh, place in Dhaka Division, Bangladesh
- Kumaran Kundram, hillrock located at Chromepet, Chennai, Tamil Nadu, India
- College Kumaran, 2008 Indian Malayalam-language film directed by Thulasidas, starring Mohanlal and Vimala Raman
- Sainikudu, dubbed in Tamil as Kumaran, a 2006 Indian Telugu-language film

== See also ==
- Kumara (disambiguation)
