= Shermi Ulahannan =

Indian kabaddi player

Shermi Ulahannan is a kabaddi player from India. she was a member of the team that won a gold medal at the 2010 Asian Games in Guangzhou.

She is from the Konnakkad locality of Malom village in Kasaragod district, Kerala. She studied in GHSS Maloth Kasaba, Vallikkadav.

She is a gold medal winner in the Asian beach Kabaddi games, 2008 in Bali (Indonesia). She was former Kerala women's kabaddi team captain. She is the first woman from Kerala to win an Asian Games gold medal in Kabaddi. She married Mr. Nimmy Sebastian on 25 October 2015. She is working in The Government Secretariat Kerala, since March 2011.
