= Aingoth =

Village in Kerala, India

Coordinates: 12.282°N 75.106°E

Aingoth is a settlement in Kerala, India. It is located on the NH17 between Nileshwar and Kanhangad towns on the Cochin-Mangalore National Highway in Kasaragod District, Kanhangad Municipality.

== Transportation ==
The national highway passing through Nileshwaram connects to Mangalore in the north and Calicut in the south. The nearest railway station is Nileshwar on the Mangalore-Palakkad line.
