= Kayal =

Kayal may refer to:

== People ==
- Beram Kayal (born 1988), Israeli professional footballer
- Neeraj Kayal, Indian computer scientist

== Other ==
- Kayal (film), a 2014 Indian Tamil-language film
- Kayalpatnam, a town in Tamil Nadu, India
- Kayal (TV series), a 2021 Indian Tamil-language TV series
- Kayal, a Malayalam-language term for a lake in India; see Geography of Kerala
- Khyal, a genre of Hindustani classical music in India
- Kayalvizhi or Kayal, a fictional character portrayed by Lakshmi Menon in the 2014 Indian film Jigarthanda
