= Juli Mathew =

American Judge (born 1977)

- Mathew in 2026

Judge of the Fort Bend County
- In office January 1, 2019 – December 31.2021
- In office January 1, 2022 – December 31, 2026
- Preceded by: Susan J. Lowery
- Succeeded by: vacant

Personal details
- Born: 1977 (age 48–49) Pathanamthitta, Kerala, India
- Party: Democratic Party
- Spouse: Jimmy Mathew
- Children: 3
- Education: Penn State University; Delaware Law School (JD)

Juli A. Mathew is the Presiding Judge of County Court at Law 3, in Fort Bend County, Texas, from 2018 to 2021, and has been re-elected since 2022. She is the first judge of Asian descent to be elected to the Bench in Fort Bend County, as well as the first Indian American woman elected to the bench in the United States.

== Early and personal life ==
Juli A. Mathew hails from Vennikulam in Thiruvalla, Pathanamthitta district of Kerala, India to Thomas Daniel, a pharmacist and businessman, and Soosamma Thomas, an RN from Perumpetty. She has a brother, Johnson. In 1986, her parents immigrated to the United States when Mathew was ten years old, following her mother's immigration. She was through the middle of her fifth grade at St. Thomas English Medium School, Vennikulam, before immigrating to the United States with her family. Mathew was raised in Philadelphia.

Mathew then attended Penn State University beginning her undergraduate studies at the University Park campus before transferring to Penn State Abington for her final two years to be closer to home, while working at Pelino & Lentz Law. She was also president of the Student Government Association at Penn State Abington and received a citation for leadership from the Pennsylvania House of Representatives. While in college, she also studied Dutch Criminal Justice at the University of Leiden in the Netherlands.

She is married to Jimmy Mathew, who hails from Bheemanady in Kasaragod district. They have three children.

== Career ==
Mathew stated that her parents dealt with financial and legal problems during their initial days in the United States prompted her to "think that this would not have happened had they known the law and legal aspects", which inspired her to study law. She served as the Associate Municipal Judge in Arcola, Texas, and has been a practising attorney since 2003, specializing in mass tort, civil litigation, probate, and criminal cases in Fort Bend and nearby counties. She was elected by her colleagues to serve as the Administrative Judge for the County Courts and also led the inaugural Juvenile Intervention and Mental Health Court.

In 2018, Mathew became the First Judge of Asian descent in Fort Bend County and the first Indian American woman to be elected to the bench in the United States. . In 2022, she re-elected for a second term for four years after defeating her Republican challenger Andrew Dornburg. She sworn in as the judge through videoconference from her husband's house in Bheemanady.
