= Kumarapala =

Kumarapala may refer to:

- Kumarapala (Chaulukya dynasty) (1143–1172 CE), a Solanki king from western India
- Kumarapala (Pala king) (c. 1130–1140 CE), a Pala king from eastern India

== See also ==
- Kumara (disambiguation)
- Pala (disambiguation)
- Kumarpal Desai (born 1942), an Indian writer
