= Belur, Kasaragod =

Village in Kerala, India

Belur Bellur
- Village
- Location in Kerala, India Belur (India)
- Coordinates: 12.3921°N 75.1812°E
- Country: India
- State: Kerala
- District: Kasargod

Government
  - Type: Panchayati raj (India)
  - Body: Kodom-Belur Grama Panchayat

Area
  - Total: 29.54 km^{2} (11.41 sq mi)

Population (2011)
  - Total: 12,181
  - Density: 412.4/km^{2} (1,068/sq mi)

Languages
  - Official: Malayalam, English
- Time zone: UTC+5:30 (IST)
- PIN: 671531
- Telephone code: 04997
- Vehicle registration: KL-14
- Assembly constituency: Kanhangad
- Lok Sabha constituency: Kasaragod
- Climate: 20c to 40c (Köppen)

Belur is a village in Vellarikundu taluk of Kasaragod district in Kerala, India.

== Administration ==
Belur village is administered by Kodom-Belur Panchayat under Kanhangad Block Panchayat. Belur is part of Kanhangad Assembly constituency under Kasaragod Loksabha constituency.

== Demographics ==
As of 2011 Census, Belur village had population of 12,181 of which 5,837 are males and 6,344 are females. Belur village spreads over an area of 29.54 km^{2} (11.41 sq mi) with 2,938 families residing in it. The sex ratio of Belur was 1,087 higher than state average of 1,084. The population of children below 6 years was 10.46%. Belur had overall literacy of 84.6% lower than state average of 94%. The male literacy stands at 89.9% and female literacy at 79.8%.
