= Kalichanadukkam =

Kalichanadukk
- village
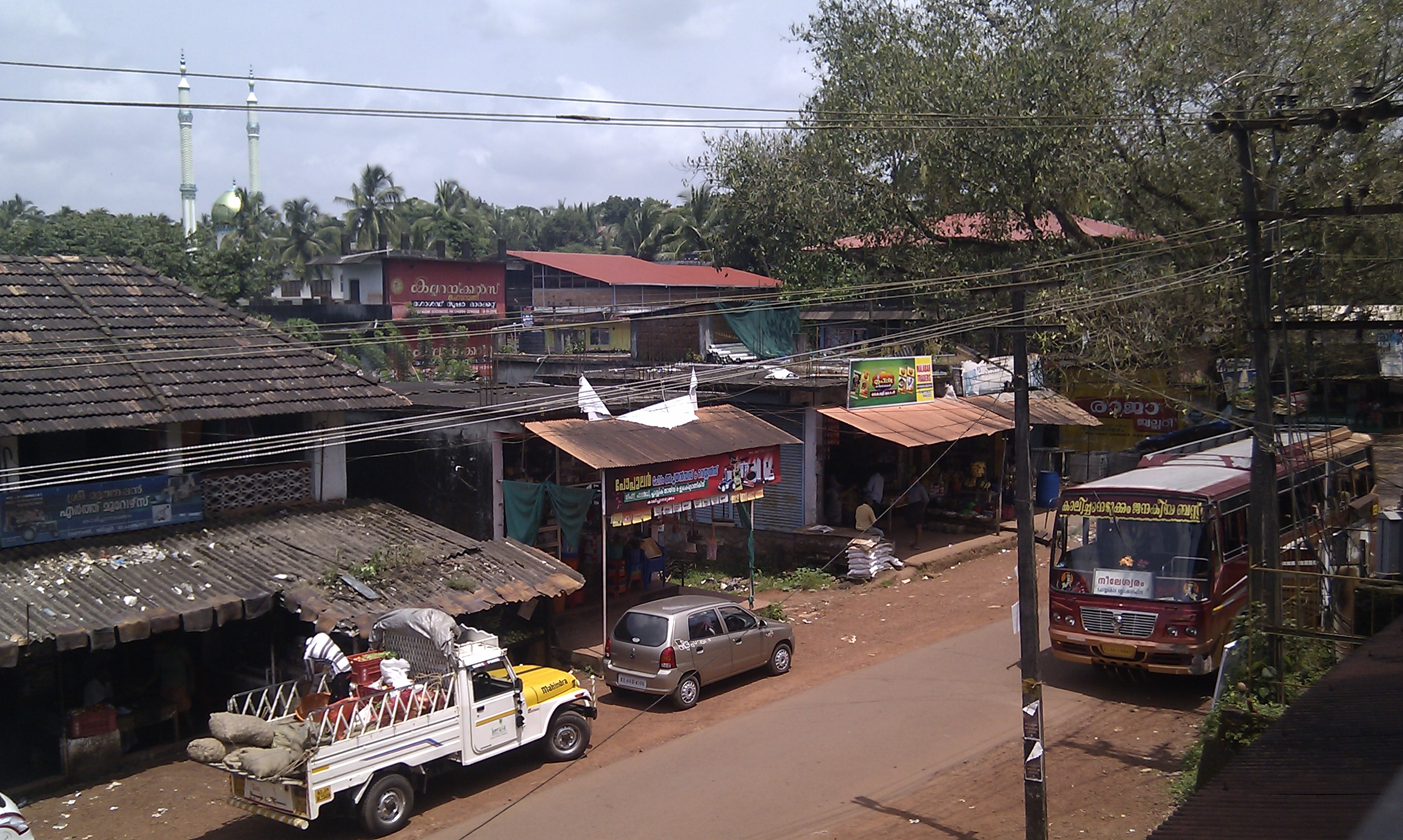
- A view of Kalichanadukkam Town

- Location in Kerala, India Kalichanadukk (India)
- Coordinates: 12.3304°N 75.2100°E
- Country: India
- State: Kerala
- District: Kasaragod

Government
  - Body: Kodom-Belur Grama Panchayat

Languages
  - Official: Malayalam
- Time zone: UTC+5:30 (IST)
- PIN: 671314
- Telephone code: 0467-2256
- Vehicle registration: KL 60, KL 79
- Nearest Town: Kanhangad
- Climate: Tropical Monsoon (Köppen)
- Avg. summer temperature: 35 °C (95 °F)
- Avg. winter temperature: 20 °C (68 °F)
- Website: http://www.kalichanadukkam.com

Kalichanadukkam or Adukkam is a small town situated in the Kasaragod district of Kerala in India. Located between Nileshwar and Vellarikundu, it is 15 km from Nileshwaram, 19 km from Kanhangad, and 15 km from Vellarikkundu. From Kalichanadukkam junction one road is towards Kanhangad, second is towards Vellarikundu and the last road towards Nileshwar.

== Educational institutions ==
- SNDP Arts and Science College
- Government High School
- Sanjo English medium high school
- Darul Uloom Madrasa

== Banks ==
- Kerala Gramin Bank
- District Co-op. Bank
- Thayannur Service Sahakarana Bank
- SBI Kiosk Bank

== Places of worship ==
- Masjid Al Farooq Kalichanadukkam
- Dharmashastha Temple, Shasthampara
- St. Joseph's Church
- Vincentian Church
- Badriya Masjid (Anappetty)

== Transportation ==
There is a bus stand in Kalichandukkam town. Buses go to Nileshwar, Kanhangad, Thayanur, Vellarikundu and Konnakkad. A national highway passing through Nileshwaram connects to Mangalore in the north and Kannur in the south. The nearest railway station is Nileshwar on Mangalore-Palakkad line. There are airports at Mangalore and kannur International Airport.
