= Palavayal =

- Village
- Location in Kerala, India Palavayal (India)
- Coordinates: 12°17′45″N 75°24′20″E
- Country: India
- State: Kerala
- District: Kasaragod
- Taluk: Vellarikundu

Government
  - Type: Revenue Village
  - Body: East Eleri Grama Panchayat

Area
  - Total: 29.99 km^{2} (11.58 sq mi)

Population (2011)
  - Total: 9,923
  - Density: 330.9/km^{2} (857.0/sq mi)

Languages
  - Official: Malayalam, English
- Time zone: UTC+5:30 (IST)
- PIN: 670511
- ISO 3166 code: IN-KL
- Vehicle registration: KL-79

Palavayal is a revenue village in the eastern hilly areas of Vellarikund taluk of Kasaragod district in the Indian state of Kerala. The village falls under East Eleri Grama Panchayat. Palavayal village consists of hamlets, like Odakkolly, Chavaragiri, and Malankadavu. The Kariangode River separates Palavayal from Pulingome, another town in Kannur District, and a bridge connects them.

The Catholic Church in Palavayal is in the name of Apostle John.

== Geography ==
Palavayal is situated on the banks of the Kariangode River also known as Tejaswini which is originated from Brahmagiri hill (not to be confused with the Brahmagiri range further south) in Karnataka. It is the main gateway to Coorg district, Karnataka.

== Demographics ==
As of the 2011 Indian census, Palavayal had a population of 9,923 in 2,371 households. Males constitute 49.85% of the population and females 50.15%.

== Transportation ==
This village is connected to Karnataka state through Panathur. There is a 20 km road from Panathur to Sullia in Karnataka from where Bangalore and Mysore can be easily accessed. Locations in Kerala can be accessed by driving towards the western side. The nearest railway stations are Nileshwar railway station (36 KM) and Payyanur railway station (42 KM) on Mangalore-Palakkad line. There are airports at Kannur (70 km) Mangalore (128 km) and Calicut (180 KM).
