= Karindalam =

- village
- Location in Kerala, India Karindalam (India)
- Coordinates: 12°17′0″N 75°14′0″E
- Country: India
- State: Kerala
- District: Kasaragod

Government
  - Type: Panchayati Raj (India)
  - Body: Kinanoor-Karindalam Grama Panchayat

Area
  - Total: 20.37 km^{2} (7.86 sq mi)

Population (2011)
  - Total: 6,602
  - Density: 324.1/km^{2} (839.4/sq mi)

Languages
  - Official: Malayalam, English
- Time zone: UTC+5:30 (IST)
- Vehicle registration: KL-79, KL-60

Karindalam is a village in Kasaragod district in the state of Kerala, India.

== Demographics ==
As of 2011 Census, Karindalam had a population of 6,602 with 3,240 males and 3,362 females. Karindalam village has an area of 20.37 km^{2} (7.86 sq mi) with 1,661 families residing in it. 9.8% of the population was under 6 years of age. Karindalam village had an average literacy of 90.13% higher than the national average of 74% and lower than state average of 94%.

== Administration ==
This panchayat is administered as a part of the newly formed Vellarikundu taluk. Kinanoor-Karindalam Panchayat is a part of Kanhangad Assembly constituency under Kasaragod Loksabha constituency.

== Transportation ==
The national highway passing through Nileshwaram connects to Mangalore in the north and Kannur in the south. The nearest railway station is Nileshwar on Mangalore-Palakkad line. There are airports at Mangalore and Kannur.
