= Kallar (Kasaragod) =

Village in Kerala, India

- village
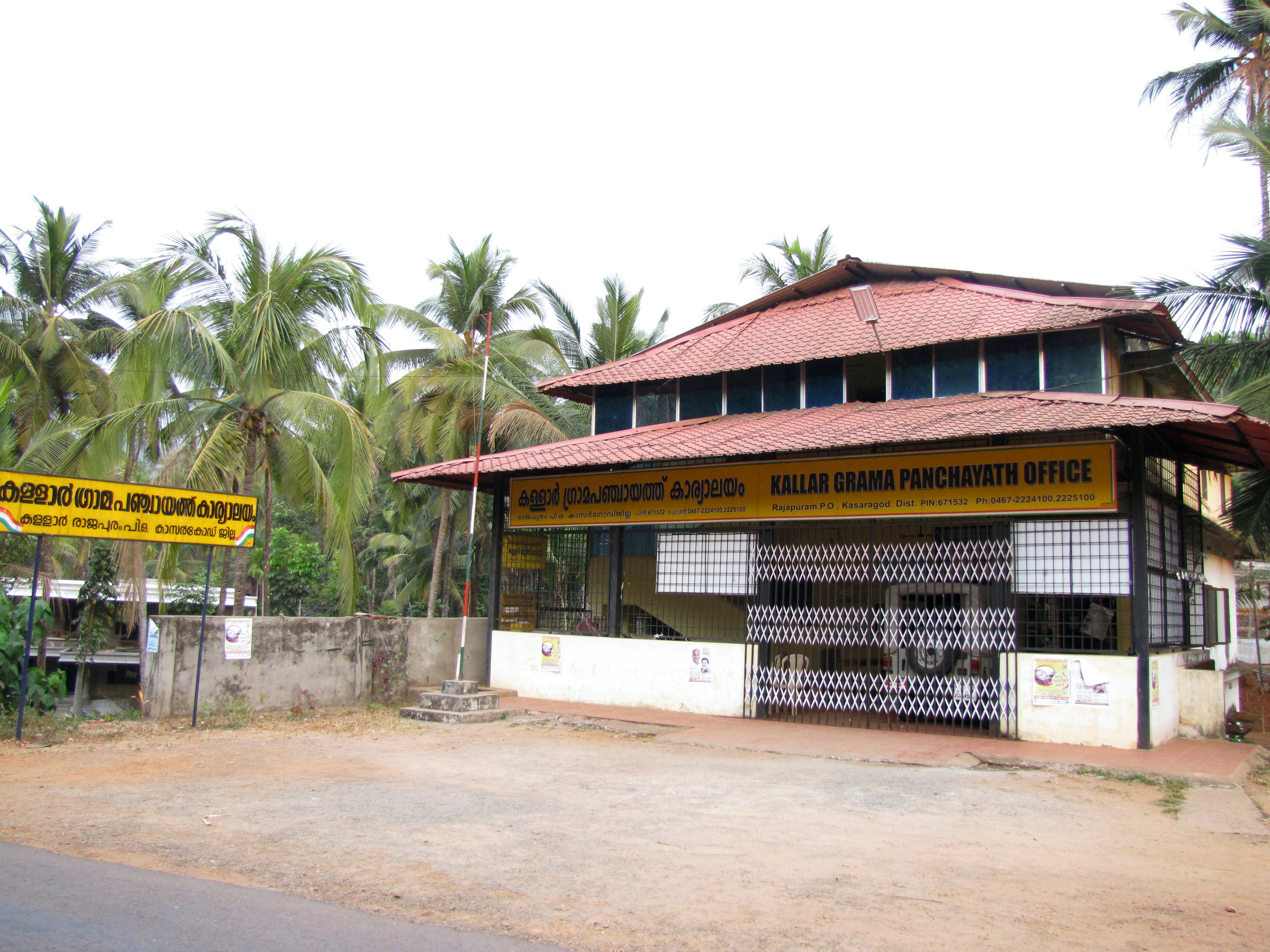
- Kallar Grama Panchayat Office

- Location in Kerala, India
- Coordinates: 12.4284°N 75.2683°E
- Country: India
- State: Kerala
- District: Kasaragod
- Taluk: Vellarikundu

Government
  - Body: Kallar Grama Panchayat

Area
  - Total: 52.67 km^{2} (20.34 sq mi)

Population (2011)
  - Total: 19,414
  - Density: 368.6/km^{2} (954.7/sq mi)

Languages
  - Official: Malayalam, English
- Time zone: UTC+5:30 (IST)
- PIN: 671532
- Vehicle registration: KL-79

Kallar is a village in Kasaragod district in the Indian state of Kerala. Kallar is located on Kanhangad-Panathur road (SH 56) of 40 km south east of Kasaragod town and 27 km north east of Kanhangad.

== Demographics ==
As of 2011 Census, Kallar village had population of 19,414 which constitutes 9,493 males and 9,921 females. Kallar village spreads over an area of 52.67 km^{2} (20.34 sq mi) with 4,691 families residing in it. The sex ratio of Kallar was 1045 lower than state average of 1084. Population in the age group 0-6 was 2,137 (11% of total population) where 1,070 are males and 1,067 are females. Kallar had overall literacy of 87% lower than state average of 94%. The male literacy stands at 91.5% and female literacy was 82.8%.

== Administration ==
Kallar Grama Panchayat is part of Kanhangad (State Assembly constituency) under Kasaragod Loksabha.

== Transportation ==
National Highway 66 passes through Kanhangad town which connects Goa and Mumbai in the northern side and Kochi and Thiruvananthapuram in southern side. State Highway 56 (Kerala) passes through Kallar which connects cities and towns of neighbouring Karnataka state. The nearest railway station is at Kanhangad on Shoranur-Mangalore Section under Southern railways. The nearest international airports are Kannur and Mangalore.
