= E. Chandrasekharan =

Indian politician

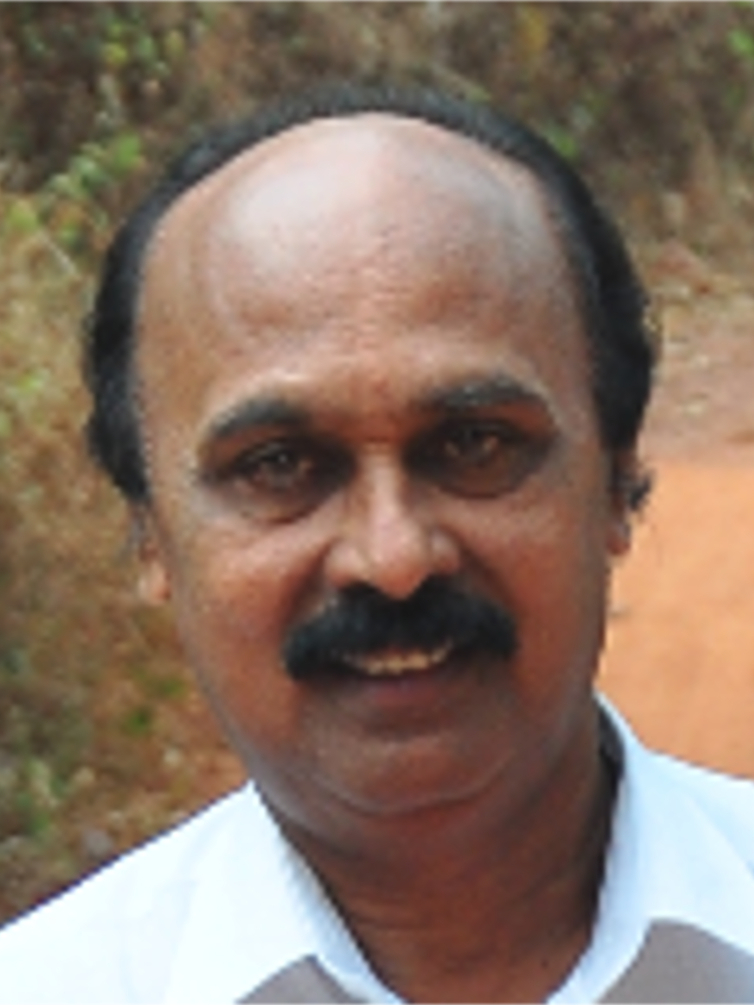
- E. Chandrasekharan

Minister for Revenue and Housing, Government of Kerala
- In office 25 May 2016 – 3 May 2021
- Preceded by: Adoor Prakash
- Succeeded by: K. Rajan

Member of Kerala Legislative Assembly
- In office 1 June 2011 – 21 May 2026
- Preceded by: constituency created
- Succeeded by: Govindan Pallikappil
- Constituency: Kanhangad

Personal details
- Born: 26 December 1948 (age 77) Perumbala, Kasaragod, Kerala, India
- Party: Communist Party of India
- Spouse: Savithri
- Children: 1
- Parents: P. Kunhiraman Nair; E. Parvathi Amma

Edayillam Chandrasekharan (born 26 December 1948) is an Indian politician from Kasaragod, and is the former Revenue Minister of Kerala in the Pinarayi Vijayan Ministry.

He is the son of P. Kunhiraman Nair and Edayillam Parvathi Amma; born at Perumbala on 26 December 1948.

He is presently representing Kanhangad assembly constituency since 2011. Additionally, Member, C.P.I., State Secretariat (Since 2005) Communist Party of India (CPI).

== Positions held ==
- Taluk Secretary, A.I.Y.F., Kasaragod (1970)
- District Secretary, A.I.Y.F., Kannur (1975)
- Member, CPI, State Council (1976)
- State Joint Secretary, A.I.Y.F. (1979)
- Member, C.P.I., Kasaragod Taluk Committee
- District Secretariat Member Kannur
- Member, Chemmanadu Grama Panchayat (1979–84)
- Assistant District Secretary, C.P.I., Kasaragod (1984)
- District Secretary, C.P.I. (1987)
- State Executive Member, C.P.I. (1998)
- Member, Kerala State Village Development Board (1987–91)
- Director Board Member, Kerala Agro Machineries Corporation (1991–96)
- Member, State Land Reforms Review Committee (2008-2010)
