= Kanhangad Assembly constituency =

Constituency of the Kerala legislative assembly in India

Kanhangad
- Constituency No. 4 for the Kerala Legislative Assembly
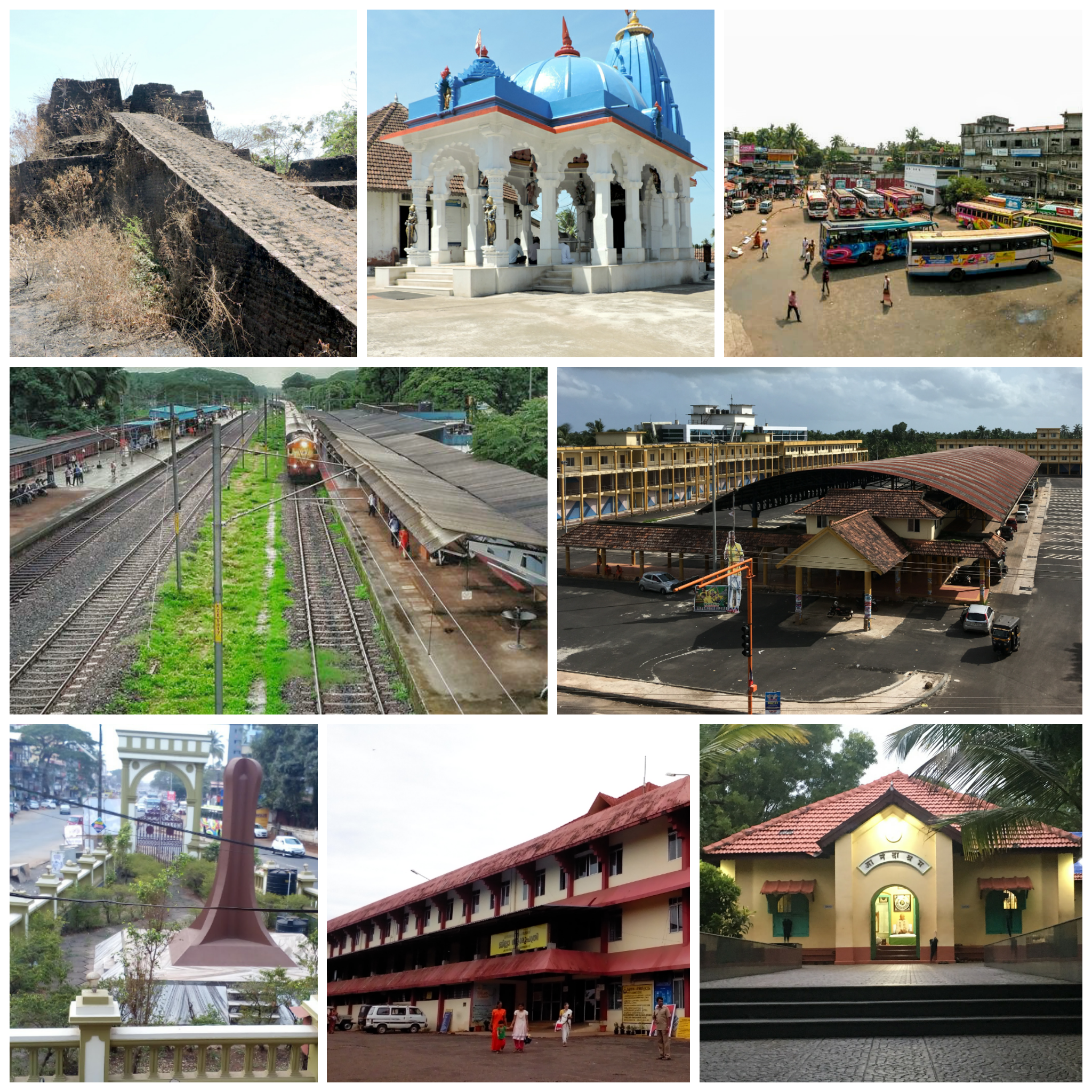
- Left to right: Hosdurg Fort, Nityananda Ashram, Old Bus Stand, Railway Station, New Bus Stand, Gandhi Smriti Mandapam, Government District Hospital, Anandashram.

Constituency details
- Country: India
- Region: South India
- State: Kerala
- District: Kasaragod
- Established: 2008
- Total electors: 2,14,209 (2021)
- Reservation: None

Member of Legislative Assembly
- 16th Kerala Legislative Assembly
- Incumbent Govindan Pallikappil
- Party: CPI
- Alliance: LDF
- Elected year: 2026

Kanhangad State assembly constituency is one of the 140 state legislative assembly constituencies in Kerala in southern India. It is also one of the seven state legislative assembly constituencies in Kasaragod Lok Sabha constituency. As of the 2026 assembly elections, the current MLA is Govindan Pallikappil of CPI.

Kanhangad Assembly constituency was established by the 2008 delimitation. Before, it was known as Hosdurg Assembly constituency from 1957 to 2008.

== Local self-governed segments ==
Kanhangad Assembly constituency is composed of the following local self-governed segments:

Sl no.	Name	Status (Grama panchayat/Municipality)	Taluk
1	Kanhangad	Municipality	Hosdurg
2	Ajanur	Grama panchayat	Hosdurg
3	Madikai	Grama panchayat	Hosdurg
4	Balal	Grama panchayat	Vellarikundu
5	Kallar	Grama panchayat	Vellarikundu
6	Kinanoor-Karindalam	Grama panchayat	Vellarikundu
7	Kodom-Bellur	Grama panchayat	Vellarikundu
8	Panathady	Grama panchayat	Vellarikundu

== Members of Legislative Assembly ==
Year	Member	Political party
Hosdurg
1957	K. Chandrasekharan	Praja Socialist Party
1960	K. Chandrasekharan	Praja Socialist Party
1967	N. K. Balakrishnan	Samyukta Socialist Party
1970	N. K. Balakrishnan	Samyukta Socialist Party
1977	K. T. Kumaran	Communist Party of India
1980	K. T. Kumaran	Communist Party of India
1982	K. T. Kumaran	Communist Party of India
1987	N. Manoharan Master	Indian National Congress
1991	M. Narayanan	Communist Party of India
1996	M. Narayanan	Communist Party of India
2001	M. Kumaran	Communist Party of India
2006	Pallipram Balan	Communist Party of India
Kanhangad
2011	E. Chandrasekharan	Communist Party of India
2016	E. Chandrasekharan	Communist Party of India
2021	E. Chandrasekharan	Communist Party of India
2026	Govindan Pallikappil	Communist Party of India

== Election results ==
=== 2026 ===
2026 Kerala Legislative Assembly election: Kanhangad
Party	Candidate	Votes	%	±%
CPI	Govindan Pallikappil	79,920	45.47	▼5.25
KEC	Shaiji Ottappally	64,604	36.75	▲2.30
BJP	M. Balraj	27,063	15.40	▲2.47
BSP	Vijayakumar B.	3,132	1.78	New entry
NOTA	None of the above	1,058	0.60	▲0.22
Margin of victory		15,316	8.72	▼7.55
Turnout		1,75,777	78.00	▲1.76
CPI hold		Swing	▼5.25	

Local Body	Booths	LDF Votes	UDF Votes	NDA/BJP Votes	Leading Front	Lead	LDF Booth Leads	UDF Booth Leads	NDA Booth Leads	Tied Booths
Ajanur	45	14,492	12,402	5,066	LDF	2,090	19	20	6	0
Madikai	22	11,481	1,470	3,259	LDF	8,222	20	0	2	0
Kodom-Belur	35	11,162	7,307	3,705	LDF	3,855	22	10	3	0
Kallar	21	4,652	5,743	2,809	UDF	1,091	4	15	2	0
Panathady	15	4,949	4,499	1,572	LDF	450	8	7	0	0
Balal	17	3,917	6,795	1,205	UDF	2,878	2	15	0	0
Kanhangad Municipality	60	18,146	19,128	7,065	UDF	982	24	32	4	0
Kinanoor-Karindalam	24	9,664	6,460	1,927	LDF	3,204	19	5	0	0
TOTAL	239	78,463	63,804	26,608	LDF	14,659	118	104	17	0

=== 2021 ===
2021 Kerala Legislative Assembly election: Kanhangad
Party	Candidate	Votes	%	±%
CPI	E. Chandrasekharan	84,615	50.72	
INC	P. V. Suresh	57,476	34.45	
BJP	M. Balraj	21,570	12.93	
SDPI	Abdul Samad T.	775	0.46	
NOTA	None of the Above	637	0.38	
Majority		27,139	16.27	
Turnout		1,66,835	76.24	
Registered electors		2,18,836		
CPI hold		Swing		

=== 2016 ===
There were 2,04,931 registered voters in the constituency for the 2016 election.

2016 Kerala Legislative Assembly election: Kanhangad
Party	Candidate	Votes	%	±%
CPI	E. Chandrasekharan	80,558	49.98	▲2.33
INC	Dhanya Suresh	54,547	33.84	▼5.11
BDJS	M. P. Raghavan	21,104	13.09	−
BSP	Chandran Parappa	965	0.60	▲0.31
PDP	Assainar Muttumthala	959	0.59	▼0.29
NOTA	None of the above	856	0.53	−
Independent	Sajeevan R.	663	0.41	
Independent	Muhammed Ali V. V.	420	0.26	
Independent	Kookal Balakrishnan	294	0.18	−
API	Raghavan B. Poodamkallu	272	0.17	−
SS	Balachandran Karimbil	260	0.16	−
Independent	K. U. Krishnakumar	186	0.12	
Independent	M. Damodaran	105	0.07	
Margin of victory		26,011	16.14	▲7.44
Turnout		1,61,189	78.66	▲0.16
CPI hold		Swing	▲2.33	

=== 2011 ===
There were 1,78,139 registered voters in the constituency for the 2011 election.

2011 Kerala Legislative Assembly election: Kanhangad
Party	Candidate	Votes	%	±%
CPI	E. Chandrasekharan	66,640	47.65	−
INC	M. C. Jose	54,462	38.95	−
BJP	Madikai Kammaran	15,543	11.11	−
Independent	P. M. Joseph	1,919	1.37	−
BSP	Gopalan K.	1,277	0.91	−
Margin of victory		12,178	8.70	−
Turnout		1,39,841	78.50	−
CPI win (new seat)				

=== 1952 ===
1952 Madras Legislative Assembly election: Hosdurg
Party	Candidate	Votes	%	±%
KMPP	Narayanan Nambiar	32,671	46.77%	
INC	Kunnikannan Nambiar	17,917	25.65%	25.65%
Socialist Party (India)	Padmanabha Nair	10,055	14.39%	
Independent	Hamid Hussain Sehammad	9,211	13.19%	
Margin of victory		14,754	21.12%	
Turnout		69,854	87.06%	
Registered electors		80,235		
KMPP win (new seat)				
