= K. T. Kumaran =

Indian politician

K. T. Kumaran (1 July 1927 – 13 May 2008) was an Indian politician and leader of Communist Party of India. He represented Hosdurg constituency in 5th, 6th and 7th Kerala Legislative Assembly.
