= Thayyeni =

- Village
- Country: India
- State: Kerala
- District: Kasaragod

Government
  - Body: East Eleri Grama Panchayat
- Elevation: 218 m (715 ft)

Languages
  - Official: Malayalam, English
- Time zone: UTC+5:30 (IST)
- PIN: 670511
- Telephone code: 04985-
- Lok Sabha constituency: Kasaragod
- Assembly constituency: Thrikaripur
- Website: www.thayyeni.tk

Thayyeni is a village located in the eastern hilly areas of Vellarikund taluk in Kasargod district of Kerala, India. The village is part of East Eleri Grama Panchayat.

== History ==
Early migration took place in 1958. There were about 30 migrated families in this area by 1965. The famine after World War II saw a large-scale migration of people from Central Travancore (specially from Meenachil Taluk) to this area. The majority of them were Roman Catholic Christians who had a different social and agricultural background. They were hard-working people, and they brought new agricultural practices to this area. They introduced cash crops like rubber to the local people. The major plantation crops of this areas since then have been rubber, arecanut, coconut, pepper etc.

Lourde Matha Church, Thayyeni was established as the filial church of Palavayal Church in 1966. It was raised to a parish on 1 May 1982. The first Holy Mass was offered by Rev. Fr. Philip Murinjakallel. The construction of the new church was completed during the tenure of Rev. Fr. George Arikunnel.

== Climate ==
Thayyeni has a tropical monsoon climate (Am) with little to no rainfall from December to March and heavy to extremely heavy rainfall from April to November.

Climate data for Thayyeni
Month	Jan	Feb	Mar	Apr	May	Jun	Jul	Aug	Sep	Oct	Nov	Dec	Year
Mean daily maximum °C (°F)	27.6 (81.7)	29.0 (84.2)	30.3 (86.5)	30.0 (86.0)	28.9 (84.0)	25.1 (77.2)	23.6 (74.5)	24.1 (75.4)	25.1 (77.2)	26.5 (79.7)	26.9 (80.4)	27.1 (80.8)	27.0 (80.6)
Daily mean °C (°F)	22.4 (72.3)	23.7 (74.7)	25.1 (77.2)	25.6 (78.1)	25.0 (77.0)	22.5 (72.5)	21.5 (70.7)	21.9 (71.4)	22.3 (72.1)	23.1 (73.6)	23.0 (73.4)	22.4 (72.3)	23.2 (73.8)
Mean daily minimum °C (°F)	17.3 (63.1)	18.4 (65.1)	19.9 (67.8)	21.2 (70.2)	21.2 (70.2)	20.0 (68.0)	19.5 (67.1)	19.7 (67.5)	19.6 (67.3)	19.7 (67.5)	19.1 (66.4)	17.7 (63.9)	19.4 (67.0)
Average precipitation mm (inches)	3 (0.1)	6 (0.2)	18 (0.7)	118 (4.6)	284 (11.2)	1,181 (46.5)	2,127 (83.7)	1,224 (48.2)	482 (19.0)	341 (13.4)	100 (3.9)	23 (0.9)	5,907 (232.4)

== Politics ==
Thayyeni is part of the Kasaragod Lok Sabha constituency and Thrikaripur Assembly constituency. Main political parties in Thayyeni are CPI(M), Indian National Congress (INC) and Kerala Congress(M). Rajmohan Unnithan from INC is the present Kasaragod MP. Sandeep Varier from INC is the sitting MLA of Thrikaripur Assembly constituency.

== Medical Facilities ==
The nearest Medical facilities are at:

- Primary Health Center, Thayyeni
- Family Health Center, Chittarikkal (10 km).
- Family Health Center, Pulingome (6 km)
- Leader Hospitals Pvt Ltd, Cherupuzha (13 km)
- Co-operative Hospital, Cherupuzha (13.5 km)
- St Sebastian’s Hospital, Kakkayamchal, Cherupuzha (14 km)
- Govt Homeo Dispensary Kannivayal (9 km)

== Transport ==
Local roads have access to NH.66, which connects to Mangalore in the north and Calicut in the south. The nearest railway station is Cheruvathur on Mangalore–Palakkad line. There are airports at Kannur, Mangalore and Calicut
