= Cheemeni-II =

Village in Kerala, India

- village
- Location in Kerala, India Cheemeni-II (India)
- Coordinates: 12.2749°N 75.2507°E
- Country: India
- State: Kerala
- District: Kasaragod
- Taluk: Vellarikundu

Area
  - Total: 3.49 km^{2} (1.35 sq mi)

Population (2011)
  - Total: 1,324
  - Density: 379/km^{2} (983/sq mi)

Languages
  - Official: Malayalam, English
- Time zone: UTC+5:30 (IST)
- PIN: 671314
- Vehicle registration: KL-60

Cheemeni-II is a village in Vellarikundu Taluk of Kasaragod district in Kerala, India.

== Demographics ==
As of 2011 Indian census, Cheemeni-II had population of 1,324 among which 637 are males and 687 are females. Cheemeni-II village has an area of 3.49 km^{2} with 387 families residing in it. The sex ratio of Cheemeni-II was 1,078 lower than state average of 1,084. In Cheemeni-II, population of children under 6 years was 8%. Cheemeni-II had overall literacy of 87.6%.
