= Kumaran (surname) =

Kumaran is a surname. Notable people with the surname include:

- Dharshan Kumaran (born 1975), an English chess grandmaster
- I. K. Kumaran (1903–1999), Indian freedom fighter who fought for liberation from France in 1954
- K. P. K. Kumaran, politician and former member of the Parliament of India who represented Tamil Nadu
- K. P. Kumaran, Malayalam film maker
- Keezhpadam Kumaran Nair (1916–2007), Kathakali artiste in classical Indian dance-drama
- Kumaran Asan (1873–1924), one of the triumvirate poets of Kerala, South India
- M. Kumaran (born 1966), Indian politician
- M. K. Kumaran (1915–1994), famous writer, journalist and politician of Kerala, India
- Moorkoth Kumaran (1874–1941), teacher and a prominent short story writer in Malayalam
- S. S. Kumaran, Tamil film composer
- Sangili Kumaran or Cankili II (died 1619), the self-proclaimed last king of the Jaffna kingdom
- Thirunavukkarasu Kumaran, Indian cricketer
- Tiruppur Kumaran (1904–1932), Indian revolutionary who participated in the Indian independence movement
- Uma Kumaran, British politician
