= Govindan Pallikappil =

Indian politician

Adv. Govindan Pallikappil

Member of the Kerala Legislative Assembly
- Incumbent
- Assumed office 21 May 2026
- Preceded by: E. Chandrasekharan
- Constituency: Kanhangad

Personal details
- Born: Govindan Pallikappil; 1966 (age 59–60) Kanhangad, Kasaragod district, Kerala, India
- Party: Communist Party of India
- Spouse: (Retired Teacher)
- Parent: Raman (father)
- Education: Graduate Professional (LLB)
- Occupation: Lawyer, Politician

Govindan Pallikappil (born 1966) is an Indian politician and legal professional serving as the member of the legislative assembly (MLA) for the Kanhangad constituency since May 2026.

A member of the Communist Party of India (CPI), he succeeded the long-serving former revenue minister E. Chandrasekharan in the Kerala Legislative Assembly.

== Early life and education ==
Govindan Pallikappil was born in Kanhangad, Kasaragod district.

He earned a BA from Calicut University in 1987 and an LLB from Kerala University in 1995.

Prior to his legislative career, he was primarily active as a socio-political activist and held leadership roles within the CPI District Council in Kasaragod.

== Political career ==
Govindan has been a long-time organizational figure for the CPI in northern Kerala. He has been involved in several legal and political challenges related to local governance and delimitation processes.

In the 2026 Kerala Legislative Assembly election, he was nominated by the LDF to contest from Kanhangad, a traditional stronghold for the CPI.

The CPI was only able to secure 8 seats in the 2026 election, as opposed to 17 seats in the 2021 election, however Govindan retained the constituency for the LDF and polled 79,920 votes.

== Election results ==
=== 2026 Kerala Legislative Assembly election ===
Party	Candidate	Votes	%	±%	
	CPI	Adv. Govindan Pallikappil	79,920	45.47	-11.75
	Kerala Congress	Shaiji Ottapalli	64,604	36.75	+4.04
	BJP	M. Balraj	27,063	15.40	+7.62
Margin of victory		15,316	8.72		
Total valid votes		1,75,758			
CPI hold		Swing	-7.90		
