= Kumara =

Kumara may refer to:

== Places ==
- Kumara (Mali), a province
- Kumara, New Zealand, a town
- Kumara (New Zealand electorate), a Parliamentary electorate

== Other uses ==
- Kumara Illangasinghe, an Anglican bishop in Sri Lanka
- Kumara (surname)
  - Vincent Kumura, Papua New Guinean politician
- The Four Kumaras, sages from the Hindu tradition
- Sweet potato, called kūmara in New Zealand

- Sweet potato cultivation in Polynesia, for information about kumara in a Polynesian context

- Kumara (plant), a genus of plants from South Africa related to Aloe
- A Hindu god and general, also named Kartikeya
  - Kumārasambhava, ancient Indian epic by Kalidasa about Kartikeya

== See also ==
- Kumaran (disambiguation)
