= M. Kumaran =

Indian politician (born 1966)

M. Kumaran (born 15 May 1966 in Elerithattu) is an Indian politician and leader of the Communist Party of India. He represented Hosdurg constituency in the 11th Kerala Legislative Assembly.
