= Kodom =

- village
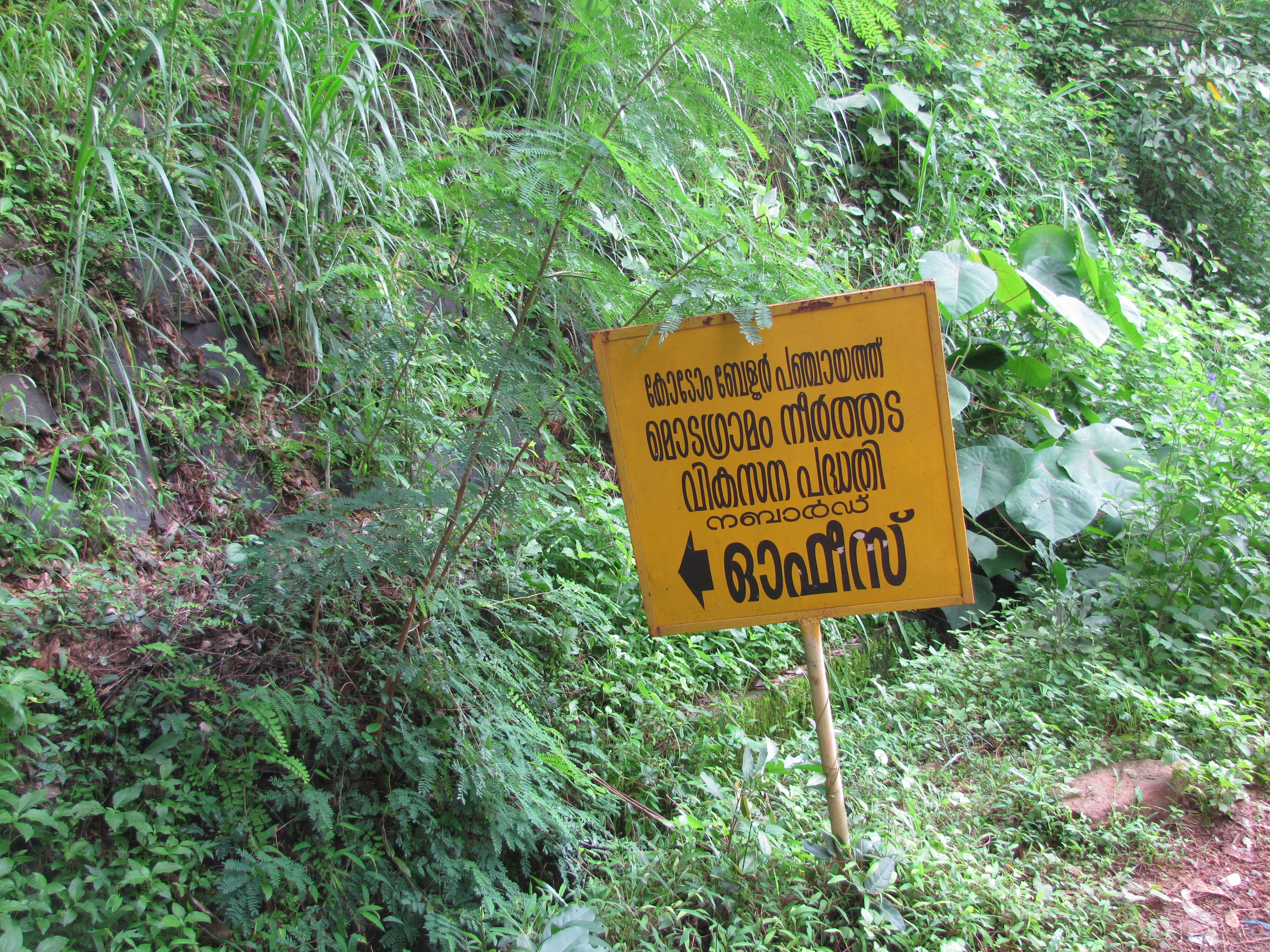
- Kodom Belur Panchayat

- Location in Kerala, India Kodom (India)
- Coordinates: 12°23′0″N 75°11′0″E
- Country: India
- State: Kerala
- District: Kasaragod

Area
  - Total: 19.72 km^{2} (7.61 sq mi)

Population (2011)
  - Total: 6,915
  - Density: 350.7/km^{2} (908.2/sq mi)

Languages
  - Official: Malayalam, English
- Time zone: UTC+5:30 (IST)
- Vehicle registration: KL-79

Kodom is a village in Kasaragod district in the state of Kerala, India.

== Demographics ==
As of 2011 India census, Kodom had a population of 6,915, with 3,341 males and 3,574 females.

== Administration ==
This panchayat is administered as a part of the newly formed Vellarikundu taluk.

== Transportation ==
This village is connected to Karnataka state through Panathur. There is a 20 km road from Panathur to Sullia in Karnataka from where Bangalore and Mysore can be easily accessed. Locations in Kerala can be accessed by driving towards the western side. The nearest railway station is Kanhangad railway station on Mangalore-Palakkad line. There are airports at Mangalore, Kannur International Airport[MATTANNUR] and. Calicut.
