= East Eleri =

Community in Kerala, India

East Eleri ഈസ്റ്റ് എളേരി
- Grama Panchayat
- Location in Kerala, India (East Eleri Panchayath Office) East Eleri (India)
- Coordinates: 12.323412°N 75.356617°E
- Country: India
- State: Kerala
- District: Kasaragod district

Government
  - Type: Grama panchayat

Area
  - Total: 62.52 km^{2} (24.14 sq mi)

Population (2011)
  - Total: 25,075
  - Density: 401.1/km^{2} (1,039/sq mi)

Languages
  - Official: Malayalam, English
- Time zone: UTC+5:30 (IST)
- PIN: 671 326
- Website: panchayat.lsgkerala.gov.in/easteleripanchayat/

East Eleri is a grama panchayat in Kasaragod district in the Kerala state, India. Its major villages include Chittarikkal and Palavayal.

== Wards ==
The East Eleri Panchayat includes 16 wards:

Ward No.	Name	Map
1	Mandapam	Location of Mandapam within East Eleri
2	Chittarikkal	Location of Chittarikkal within East Eleri
3	Pallikkunnu	Location of Pallikkunnu within East Eleri
4	Kavunthala	Location of Kavunthala within East Eleri
5	Thayyeni	Location of Thayyeni within East Eleri
6	Malankadavu	Location of Malankadavu within East Eleri
7	Palavayal	Location of Palavayal within East Eleri
8	Eanichal	Location of Eanichal within East Eleri
9	Kannivayal	Location of Kannivayal within East Eleri
10	Nallompuzha	Location of Nallompuzha within East Eleri
11	Ponkal	Location of Ponkal within East Eleri
12	Vellarikundu	Location of Vellarikundu within East Eleri
13	Kollada	Location of Kollada within East Eleri
14	Kamballur	Location of Kamballur within East Eleri
15	Kadumeni	Location of Kadumeni within East Eleri
16	Kara	Location of Kara within East Eleri

== Transportation ==
The SH-59 runs directly through the panchayat.
