= Kumara (Mali) =

Coordinates: 14°07′N 5°09′W

- Province
- Interactive map of Kumara
- Country: Mali
- Region: Mopti
- Time zone: UTC

Kumara is a populated area in the Mopti Region of Mali.

== Geography ==
- Latitude, longitude: 14.1167, -5.1500 (14° 7' N, 5° 9' W)
- Altitude (feet): 823
- Altitude (meters): 250
- Time zone: UTC 0
