= Kumaran, Bangladesh =

Kumaran
- Location in Bangladesh
- Coordinates: 23°49′47″N 90°18′6″E
- Country: Bangladesh
- Division: Dhaka Division

Kumaran is name of a place in Dhaka Division, Bangladesh.
