= Konnakkad =

Village in Kerala, India

Konnakkad is a hilly region in Maloth village of Kasaragod District in the state of Kerala. Konnakkad is Located in Kerala-Karnataka Border.

== Transportation ==
Konnakkad is able to connect Karnataka state through Kanhangad-Panathur-Madikeri Road from Odayanchal.

Ksrtc Buses provide routes to Kanhangad, Nileshwar, Kasaragod, Kannur, Kozhikode, Thrissur, Guruvayur, Kumali, Pala, Muvattupuzha , Ernakulam and Kottayam.

The nearest Railway station is Nileshwar on Mangalore-Palakkad Line.

The nearest Airport is Mangalore on North and Kannur on South.

== Tourist attractions ==
Konnakkad is located in the Hill range of Kasaragod. Talakaveri temple the origin of Kaveri River is nearest to Konnakkad.

Konnakkad is famous for Kottancheri Hills and Achankallu Waterfalls situated in Konnakkad Town. Kottancheri Hills is a rain forest in Kasaragod District. The St. Mary's Church, Konnakkad is visited by devotees every year.
