= M. Narayanan =

Indian politician (1956–2020)

M. Narayanan (1 July 1956 - 9 November 2020) was an Indian politician of the Communist Party of India.

He served as a member of the Kerala Legislative Assembly from 2001 to 2011, representing Kuzhalmannam.

Narayanan died from COVID-19 in 2020, at the age of 69. COVID-19 pandemic in India.
