= West Eleri =

West Eleri വെസ്റ്റ് എളേരി
- Village
- Location in Kerala, India West Eleri (India)
- Coordinates: 12.345279°N 75.332068°E
- Country: India
- State: Kerala
- District: Kasaragod

Government
  - Type: Village
  - Body: West Eleri Grama Panchayat

Area
  - Total: 28.11 km^{2} (10.85 sq mi)

Population (2011)
  - Total: 10,656
  - Density: 379.1/km^{2} (981.8/sq mi)

Languages
- Time zone: UTC+5:30 (IST)
- ISO 3166 code: IN-KL
- Vehicle registration: KL-60, KL-79
- Nearest city: Kanhangad
- Nearest railway station: Nileshwar

West Eleri is a Grama Panchayat in Kasaragod district in the state of Kerala, India. It is located in the Vellarikundu Taluk of Kasaragod.

== Wards ==
The West Eleri Panchayat includes 18 wards:

Ward No.	Name	Map
1	Parappachal	Location of Parappachal within West Eleri
2	Bheemanady	Location of Bheemanady within West Eleri
3	Chennadukkam	Location of Chennadukkam within West Eleri
4	Eleri	Location of Eleri within West Eleri
5	Punnakunnu	Location of Punnakunnu within West Eleri
6	Plachikkara	Location of Plachikkara within West Eleri
7	Nattakkal	Location of Nattakkal within West Eleri
8	Karuvankayam	Location of Karuvankayam within West Eleri
9	Paramba	Location of Paramba within West Eleri
10	Chattamala	Location of Chattamala within West Eleri
11	Kottamala	Location of Kottamala within West Eleri
12	Narkilakkad	Location of Narkilakkad within West Eleri
13	Eachippoyil	Location of Eachippoyil within West Eleri
14	Mandapam	Location of Mandapam within West Eleri
15	Kammadam	Location of Kammadam within West Eleri
16	Moukode	Location of Moukode within West Eleri
17	Perumbatta	Location of Perumbatta within West Eleri
18	Kunnumkai	Location of Kunnumkai within West Eleri

== Demographics ==
As of the 2011 Indian census, West Eleri had a population of 10656, including 5315 males and 5341 females.
