= Vellarikundu =

- Taluk
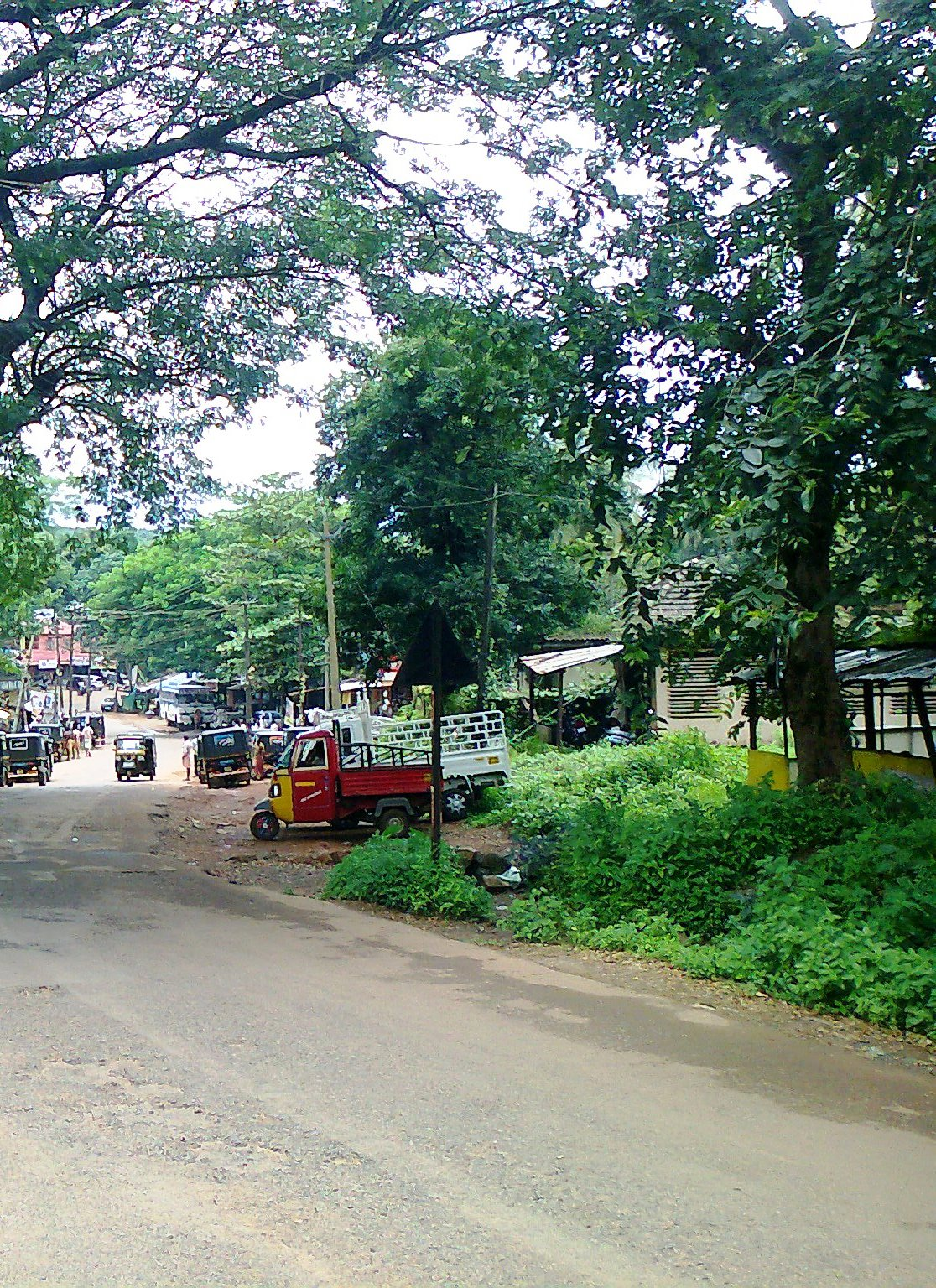

- Location within Kerala Location within India
- Coordinates: 12.36750°N 75.28313°E
- Country: India
- State: Kerala
- District: Kasaragod

Government
  - Type: Taluk
  - Body: Balal Grama Panchayat

Area
  - Total: 550.39 km^{2} (212.51 sq mi)

Population (2011)
  - Total: 181,247
  - Density: 329.31/km^{2} (852.90/sq mi)

Languages
- Time zone: UTC+5:30 (IST)
- PIN: 671534
- Telephone code: 04672
- Vehicle registration: KL-79
- Nearest city: Kanhangad (30 km)
- Nearest railway station: Kanhangad (31 km), Nileshwaram (27 km)

Vellarikund is a town and taluk headquarters in the Hill range of Kasaragod District in the state of Kerala. Vellarikundu is located on Odayanchal-Cherupuzha Major District Road (MDR). The nearest city Kanhangad is 30 km towards west.

== Etymology ==
'Vellari-' comes from the Malayalam word 'വെള്ളരിക്ക' which means cucumber. '-kund' means low surface or pit. The place was formerly used for harvesting cucumbers.

== Transportation ==
Vellarikundu is able to connect Mysore and Bangalore by Kanhangad-Panathur-Madikeri Road from Odayanchal. Private and Ksrtc Buses provide routes to Kanhangad, Kasaragod, Mangalore, Mysore, Bangalore, Kannur, Calicut, Kottayam and Pathanamthitta.

The nearest railway station is Nileshwar Railway Station on Mangalore-Palakkad Line. The nearest airport is Mangalore International Airport on North and Kannur International Airport on South.

== History ==
Vellarikundu Taluk was announced in the Kerala budget of 2013. On 21 February 2014, the new taluk was inaugurated by the Sri Oommen Chandy chief minister of the state. The taluk was created by splitting the Hosdurg taluk.

== Tourism ==
Kammadam Kavu is a sacred grove near Vellarikkundu with 60 acres of rarer birds and other small animals. It is one of the biggest sacred groves of Kerala.

== Demographics ==
Population. (2011). • Total. 181,247. • Density, 330/km2 (850/sq mi). Languages. Time zone · UTC+5:30 (IST). PIN. 671534. Telephone code, 04672. Vehicle.

== Vellarikundu Taluk ==
Vellarikundu is one of the four taluks of Kasaragod district. It was carved out from Hosdurg taluk in 2013.

== Administration ==
Vellarikundu taluk has administration over 15 revenue villages. They are: Balal, Bheemanady, Belur, Cheemeni-II, Chittarikkal, Karindalam, Kinanoor, Kodom, Maloth, Palavayal, Parappa, Thayannur, West Eleri, Kallar, Panathady.

== Church ==
Little Flower Church

== Schools ==
St.Jude's Higher Secondary School, St Elizabeth convent school Vellarikundu, Nirmalagiri L.P School, Little Flower English Medium School
