= Thayannur, Kasaragod =

Thayannur
- Village
- Location in Kerala, India Thayannur (India)
- Coordinates: 12°18′0″N 75°5.4′0″E
- Country: India
- State: Kerala
- District: Kasaragod

Area
  - Total: 39.94 km^{2} (15.42 sq mi)

Population (2011)
  - Total: 11,949
  - Density: 299.2/km^{2} (774.9/sq mi)

Languages
  - Official: Malayalam
- Time zone: UTC+5:30 (IST)
- PIN: 671531
- Telephone code: 0467-2256
- Vehicle registration: KL 60, KL 14
- Nearest Town: Kalichanadukkam
- Climate: Tropical Monsoon (Köppen)
- Avg. summer temperature: 35 °C (95 °F)
- Avg. winter temperature: 20 °C (68 °F)

Thayannur is a small village situated in the Kasaragod district of Kerala in India. It is located on the way between Kanhangad and Kalichanadukkam. It is situated at the junction of two routes, one towards Kanhangad, and second one towards Nileshwar.

== Educational Institutions ==
- Govt. Higher secondary school, Thayannur

== Places of Worship ==
- Sri Mahavishnu Temple, Thayannur
- Holy spirit Church, Ennappara
- Thayannur Juma masjid Thayannur

== Transportation ==
The national highway passing through Nileshwaram connects to Mangalore in the north and kannur in the south. The nearest railway station is Nileshwar on Mangalore-Palakkad line. There are airports at Mangalore and Kannur International Airport.
