= Geography of Kerala =

Agroecological zones of Kerala

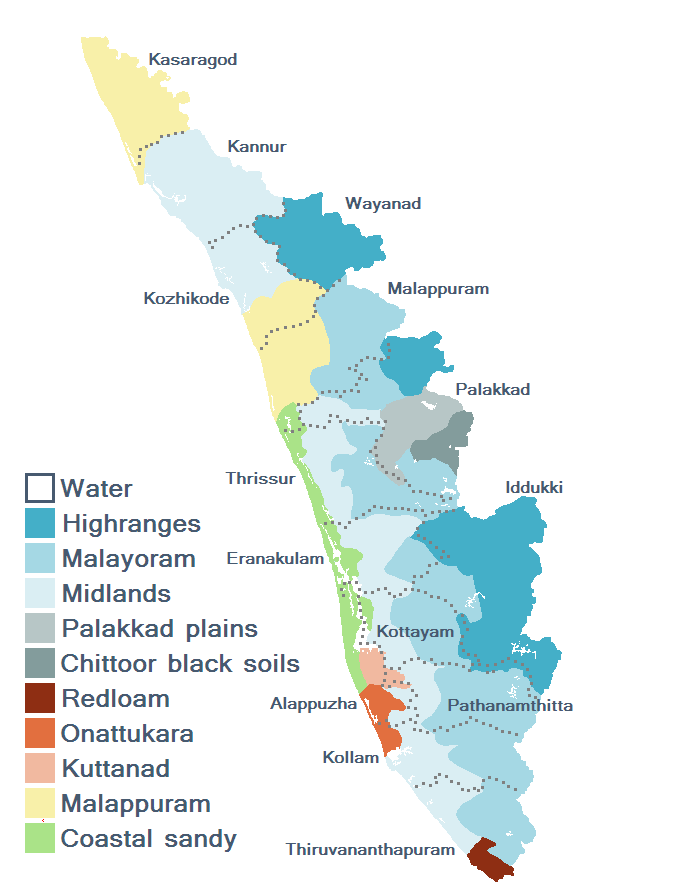
Kerala's agroecological zones.

Kerala's districts, shaded by biome and soil types.

Kerala (38,863 km^{2}; 1.18% of India's land) is situated between the Lakshadweep Sea to the west and the Western Ghats to the east. Kerala's coast runs some 590 km in length, while the state itself varies between 35–120 km in width. Geologically, pre-Cambrian and Pleistocene formations comprise the bulk of Kerala's terrain. The topography consists of a hot and wet coastal plain gradually rising in elevation to the high hills and mountains of the Western Ghats. Kerala lies between northern latitude of 8°.17'.30" N and 12°. 47'.40" N and east longitudes 74°.27'.47" E and 77°.37'.12" E. Kerala's climate is mainly wet and maritime tropical, heavily influenced by the seasonal heavy rains brought up by the monsoon Weather.

== Climate ==
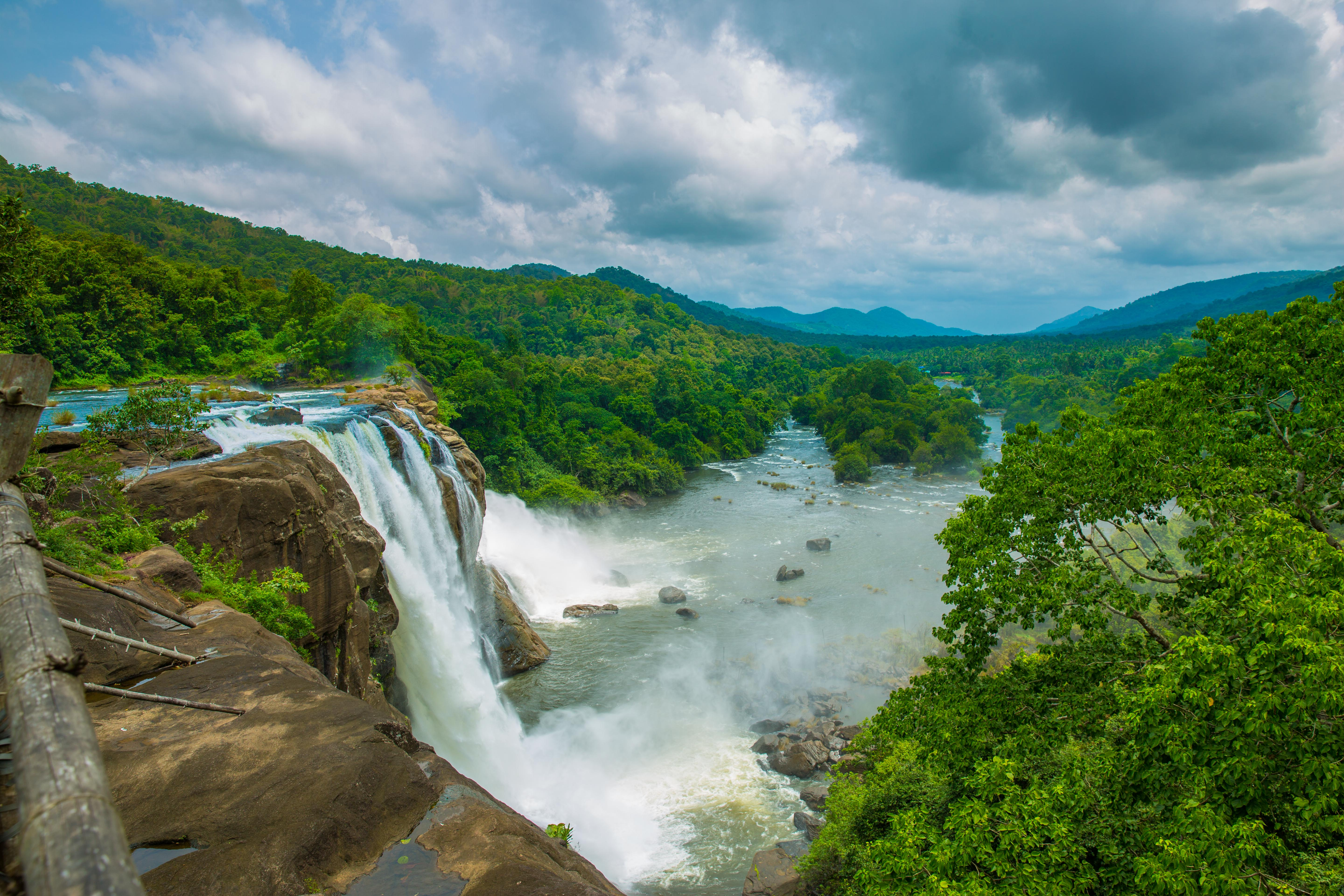
Athirappilly Falls, the largest waterfall in the state.

Kerala, which lies in the tropical region, is mostly subject to the type of humid tropical wet climate experienced by most of Earth's rainforests. As per Köppen climate classification, it belongs to the category of Tropical monsoon climate Meanwhile, its extreme eastern fringes experience a drier tropical wet and dry climate. Kerala receives an average annual rainfall of 3107 mm – some 7,030 crore m^{3} of water. This compares to the all-India average is 1,197 mm. Parts of Kerala's lowlands may average only 1250 mm annually while the cool mountainous eastern highlands of Idukki district – comprising Kerala's wettest region – receive in excess of 5,000 mm of orographic precipitation (4,200 crore of which are available for human use) annually. Kerala's rains are mostly the result of seasonal monsoons. As a result, Kerala averages some 120–140 rainy days per year. In summer, most of Kerala is prone to gale-force winds, storm surges, and torrential downpours accompanying dangerous cyclones coming in off the Indian Ocean. Kerala's average maximum daily temperature is around 37 °C; the minimum is 19.8 °C.

The moisture-laden winds of the Southwest Monsoon, on reaching the southernmost point of the Indian Peninsula, because of its topography, divides into two branches; the "Arabian Sea Branch" and the "Bay of Bengal Branch". The "Arabian Sea Branch" of the Southwest monsoon first hits the Western Ghats, making Kerala the first state in India to receive rain from the Southwest monsoon.

== Geography ==
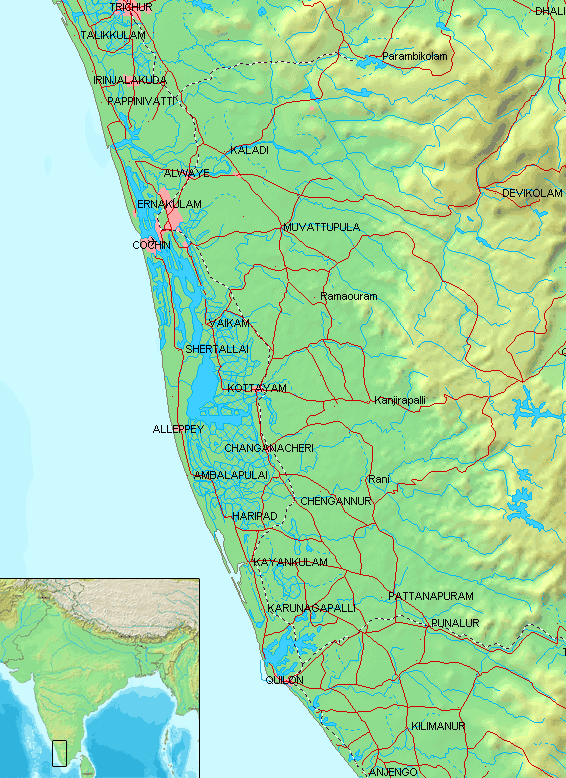
Topography of Kerala's largest backwaters region
Topographical chart of the backwaters region, centered on the districts of Eranakulam, Alappuzha, Kottayam, Pathanamthitta, and Kollam.
| → Indian Ocean. |
| → Inland freshwater bodies and estuaries. |
| → Coastal lowlands and midlands. |
| → Montane highlands (Western Ghats). |
| → Urbanized areas (towns and cities). |
| → Land transportation network (e.g., roads). |

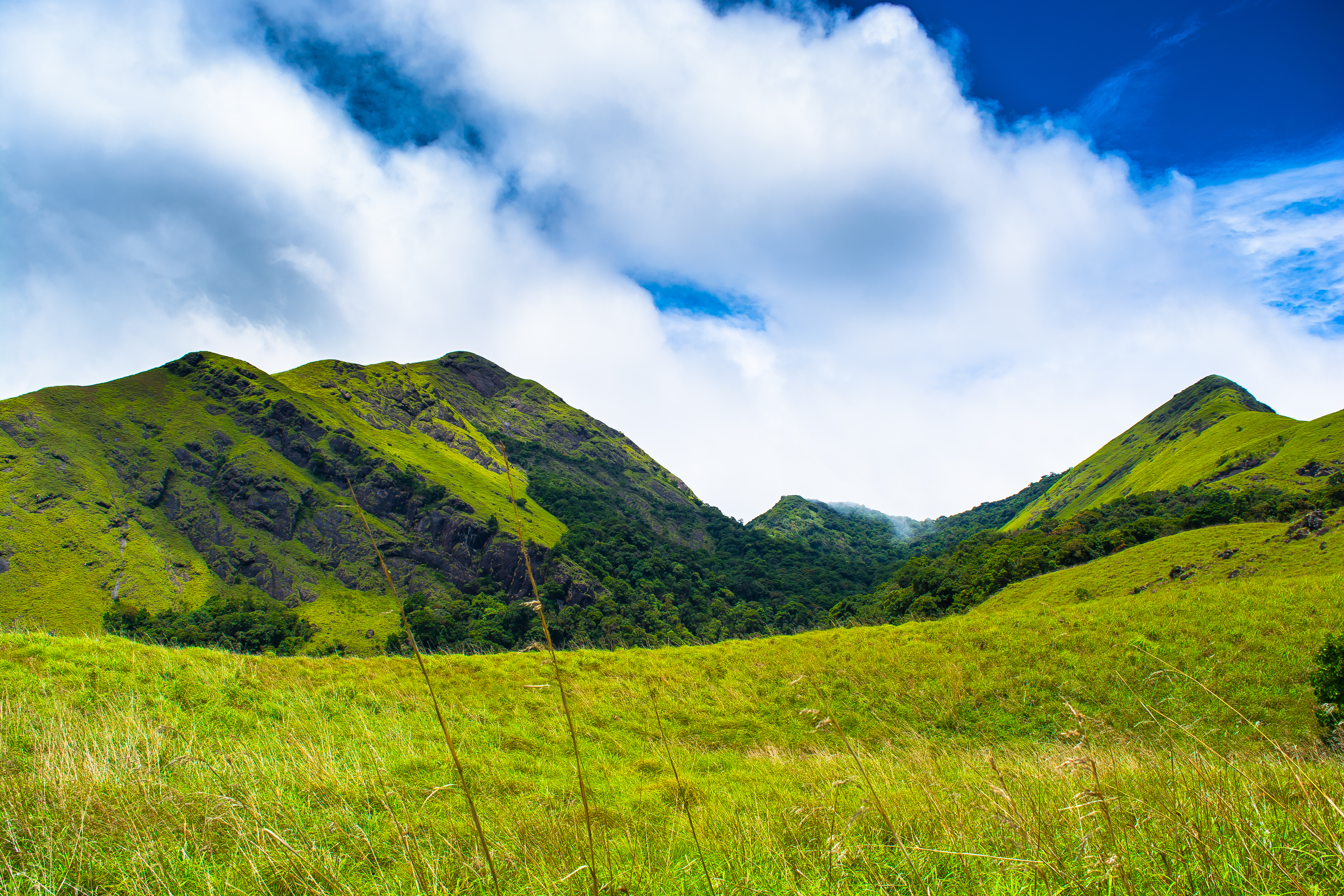
Chembra Peak, Wayanad

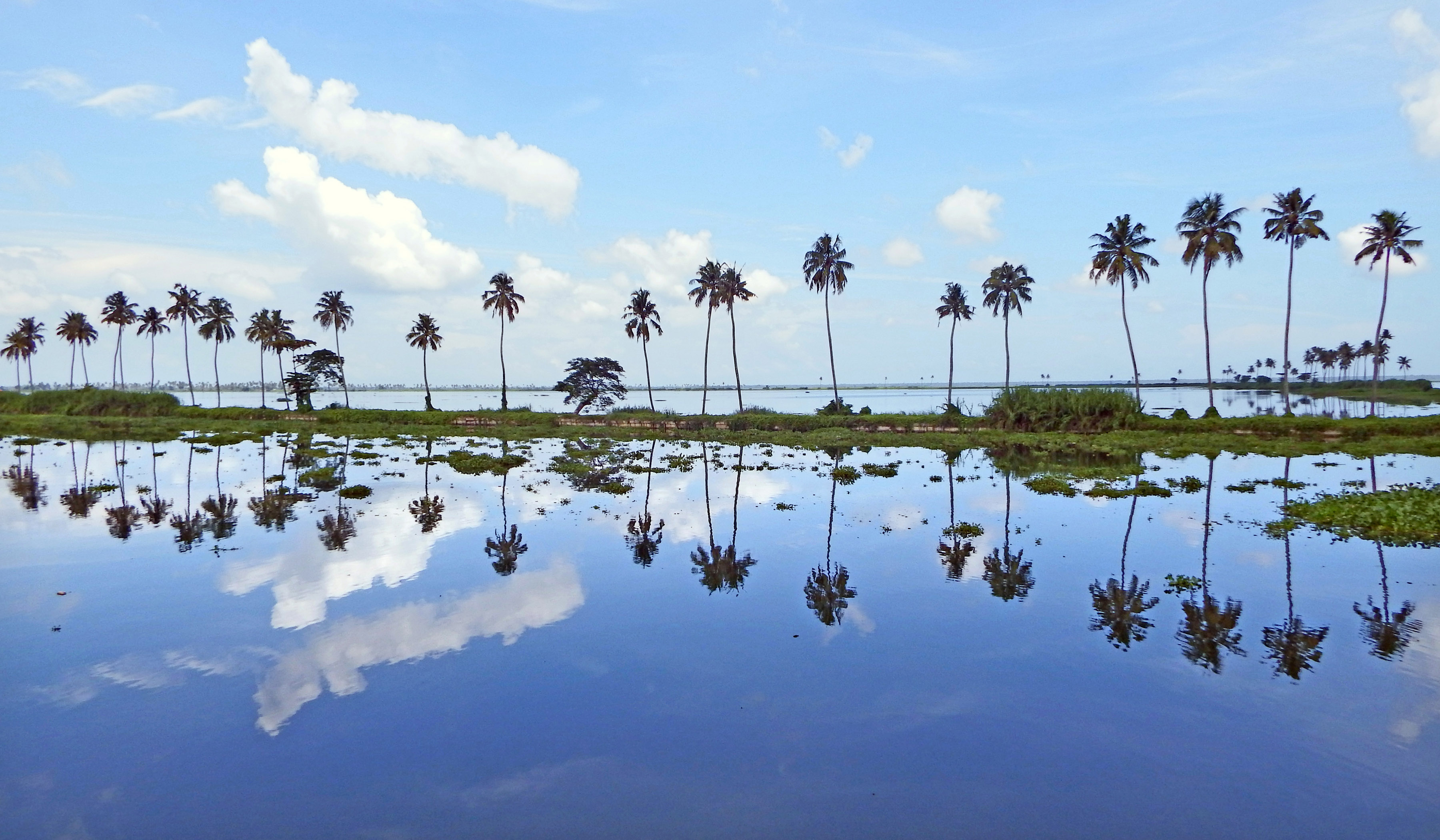
Vembanad, the largest lake in India, is a portion of the Kerala Backwaters

A substantial portion of Malabar Coast including the western coastal lowlands and the plains of the midland may have been under the sea in ancient times. Marine fossils have been found in an area near Changanassery, thus supporting the hypothesis. Pre-historical archaeological findings include dolmens of the Neolithic era in the Marayur area of the Idukki district, which lie on the eastern highland made by Western Ghats. Rock engravings in the Edakkal Caves, in Wayanad, date back to the Neolithic era around 6000 BCE.

Eastern Kerala consists of land encroached upon by the Western Ghats; the region thus includes high mountains, gorges, and deep-cut valleys. The wildest lands are covered with dense forests, while other regions lie under tea and coffee plantations (established mainly in the 19th and 20th centuries) or other forms of cultivation. Forty-one of Kerala's forty-four rivers originate in this region, and the Cauvery River descends from there and drains eastwards into neighboring states. Here, the Western Ghats form a wall of mountains penetrated near Palakkad; here, a natural mountain pass known as the Palakkad Gap breaks through to access inner India. The Western Ghats rises on average to 1500 m elevation above sea level. Certain peaks may reach to 2500 m. Just west of the mountains lie the midland plains, comprising a swathe of land running along central Kerala. Here, rolling hills and shallow valleys fill a gentler landscape than the highlands. In the lowest lands, the midlands region hosts paddy fields; meanwhile, elevated lands slopes play host to groves of rubber and fruit trees in addition to other crops such as black pepper, tapioca, and others. Wayanad is the sole Plateau in Kerala. The eastern regions in the districts of Wayanad, Malappuram (Chaliyar valley at Nilambur), and Palakkad (Attappadi Valley), which together form parts of the Nilgiri Biosphere Reserve and a continuation of the Mysore Plateau, are known for natural Gold fields, along with the adjoining districts of Karnataka.

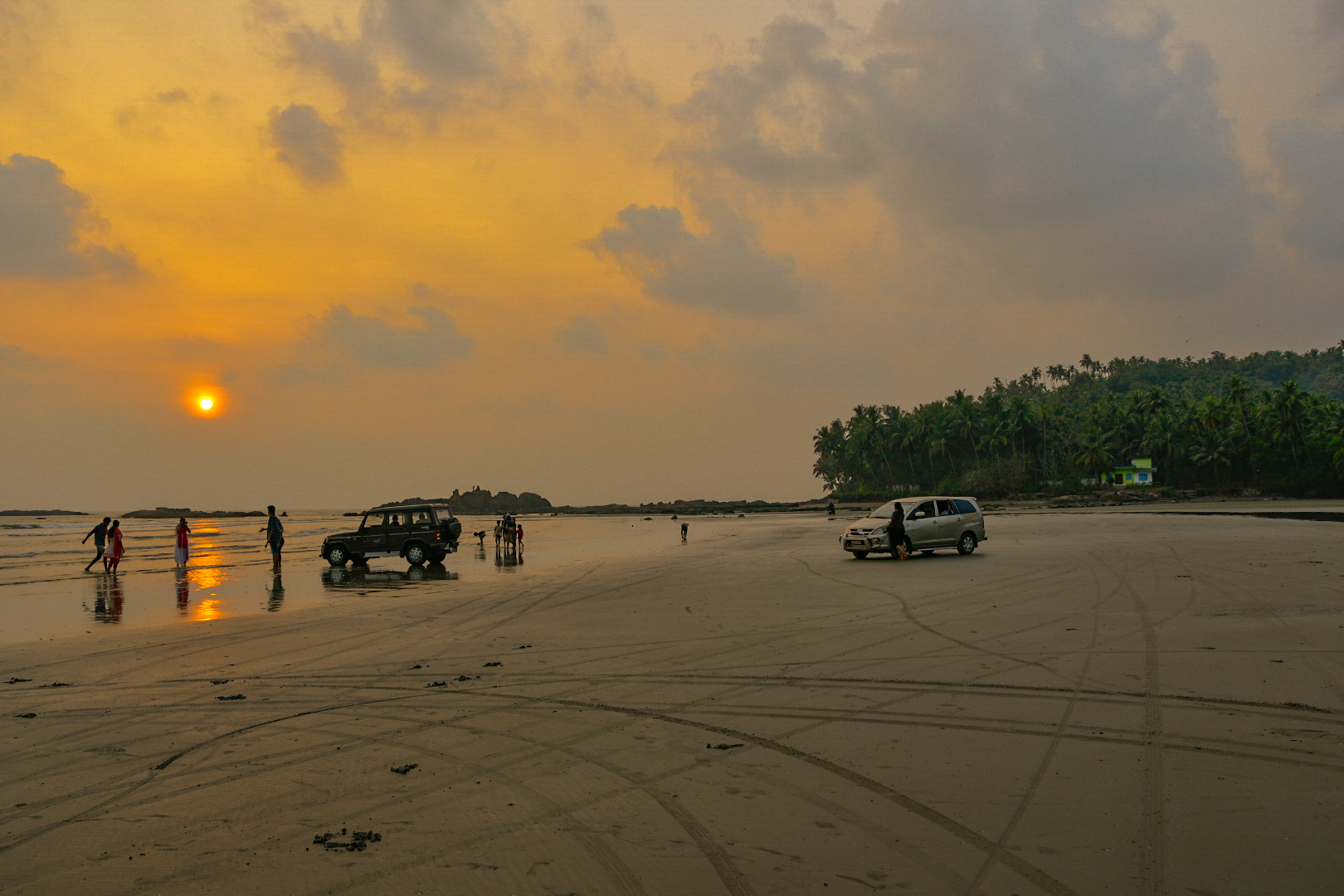
Muzhappilangad Beach, the longest drive-in beach in Asia

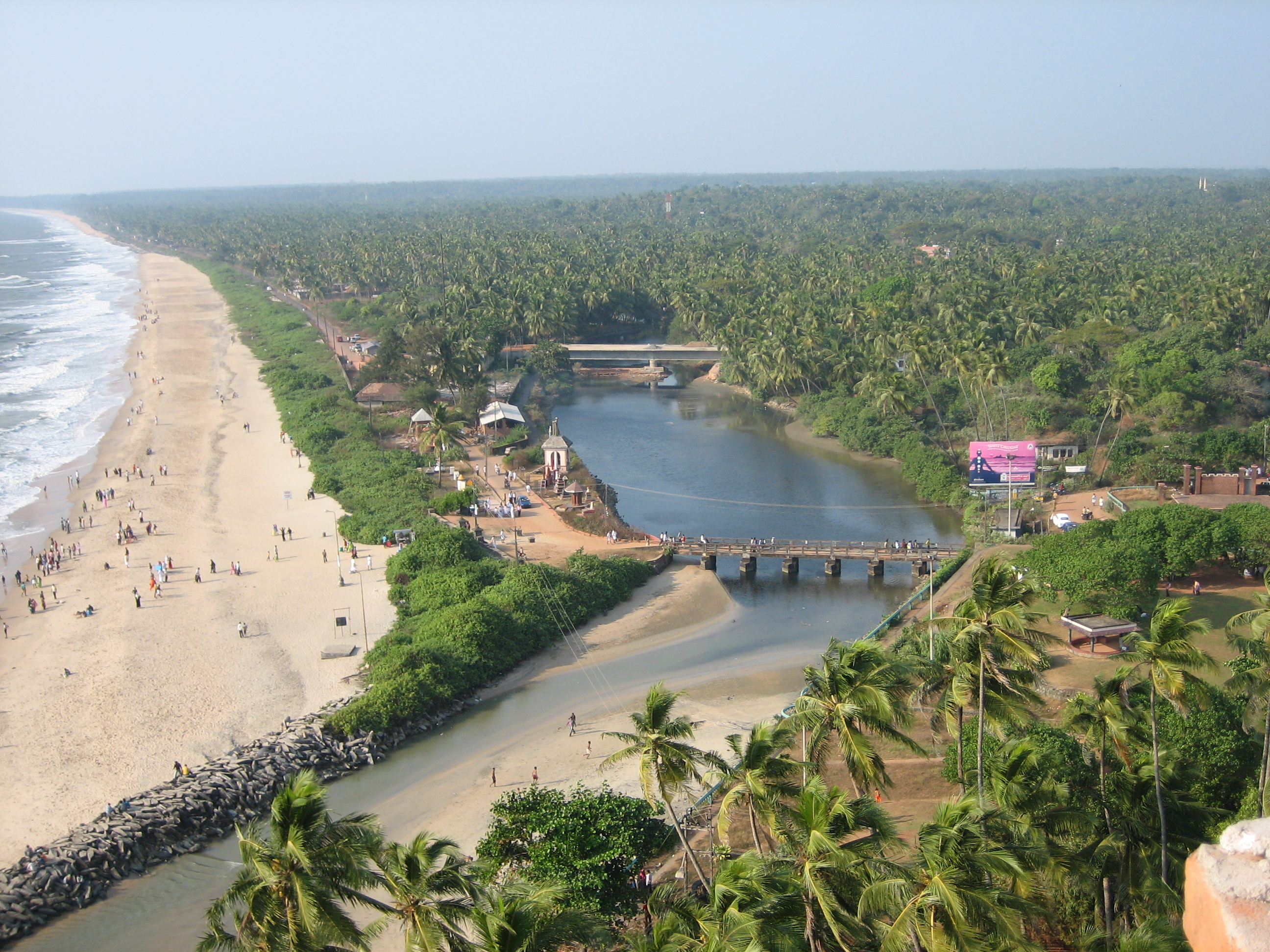
Payyambalam beach at Kannur.

Finally, Kerala's coastal belt is relatively flat, teeming with paddy fields, groves of coconut trees, and heavily crisscrossed by a network of interconnected canals and rivers. The comparative water-richness of the coastal belt can be partly gauged by the fact that Kuttanad, with its backwaters canals and rivers, itself comprises more than 20% of India's waterways by length. Kuttanad, also known as The Rice Bowl of Kerala, has the lowest altitude in India, and is also one of the few places in world where cultivation takes place below sea level. Minerals including Ilmenite, Monazite, Thorium, and Titanium, are found in the coastal belt of Kerala. Kerala's coastal belt of Karunagappally is known for high background radiation from thorium-containing monazite sand. In some coastal panchayats, median outdoor radiation levels are more than 4 mGy/yr and, in certain locations on the coast, it is as high as 70 mGy/yr. The most important of Kerala's forty-four rivers include the Periyar (244 km in length), the Bharathapuzha (209 km), the Pamba River (176 km), the Chaliyar river (169 km) the Chalakudy Puzha (144 km), the Kadalundipuzha (130 km), and the Achancoil (128 km). Most of the remainder are small and entirely fed by the Monsoons.

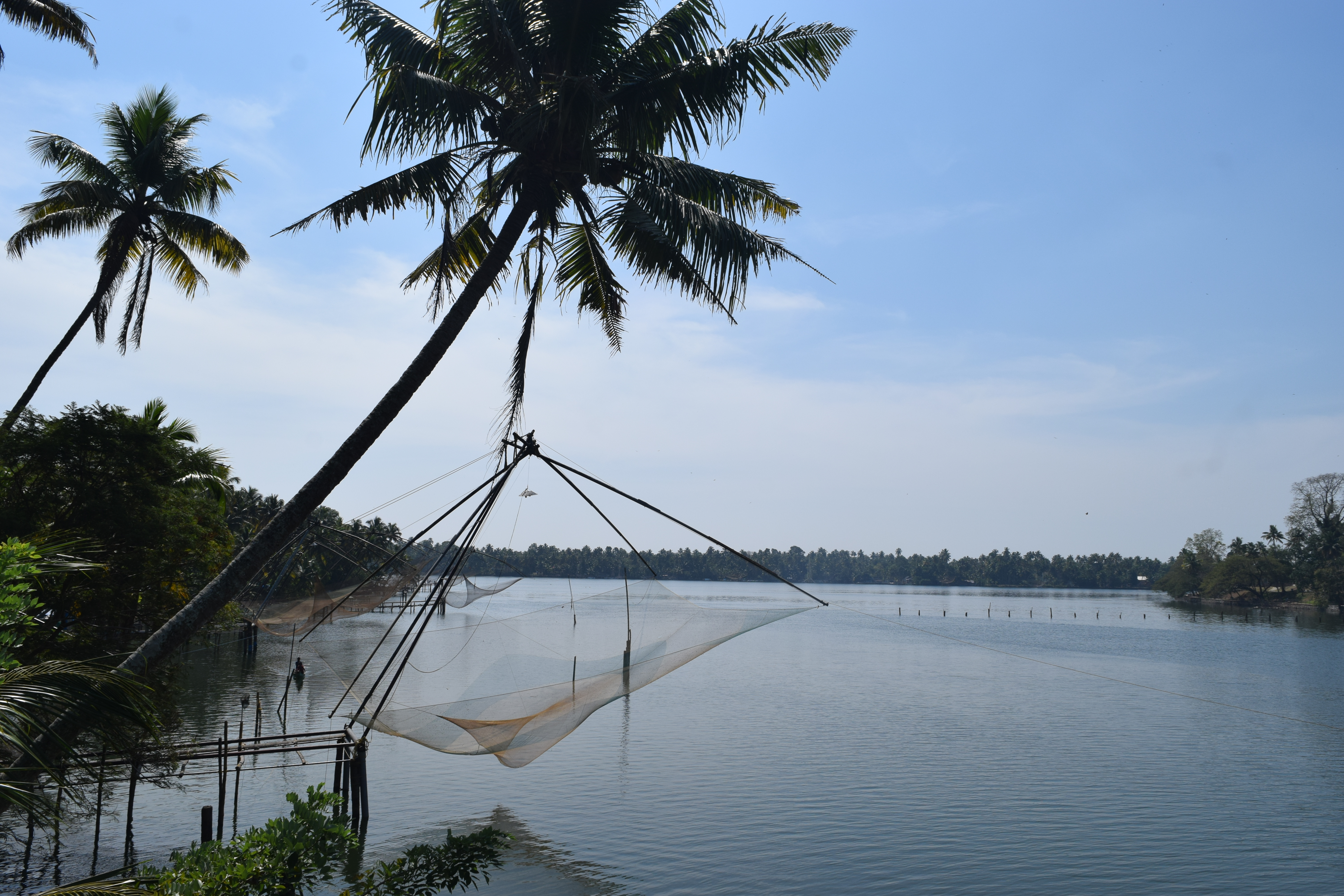
Periyar, the longest river of Kerala.

There are 44 rivers in Kerala, all but three originating in the Western Ghats. 41 of them flow westward and 3 eastward. The rivers of Kerala are small, in terms of length, breadth and water discharge. The rivers flow faster, owing to the hilly terrain and as the short distance between the Western Ghats and the sea. All the rivers are entirely monsoon-fed and many of them shrink into rivulets or dry up completely during summer.

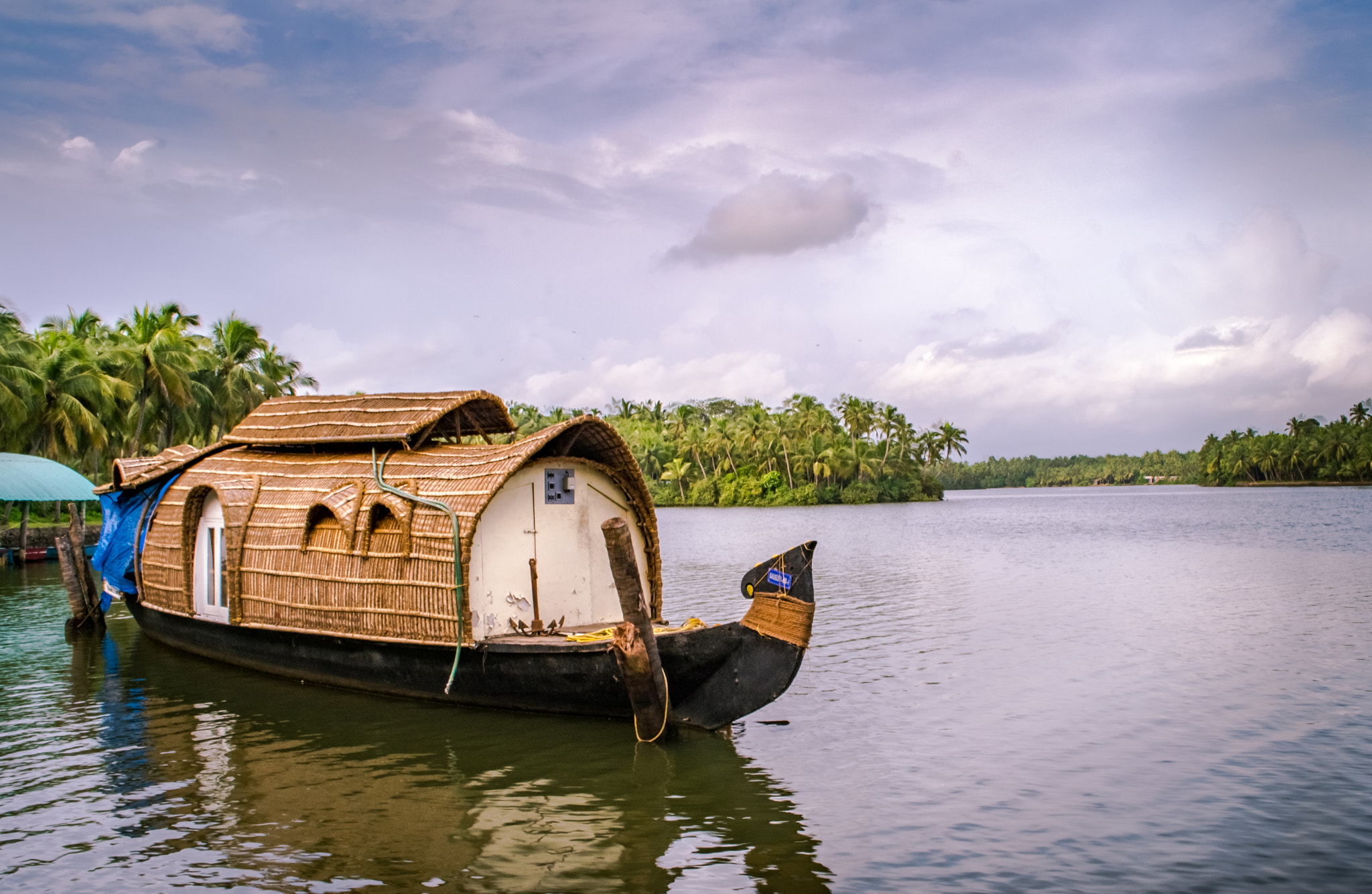
A House Boat View from Biyyam backwater, Ponnani, India

The Kerala Backwaters region is a particularly well-recognized feature of Kerala; it is an interconnected system of brackish water lakes and river estuaries that lies inland from the coast and runs virtually the length of the state. These facilitate inland travel throughout a region roughly bounded by Thiruvananthapuram in the south and Vatakara (which lies some 450 km to the north). There are 34 backwaters in Kerala. Lake Vembanad—India's largest body of water —dominates the backwaters; it lies between Alappuzha and Kochi and is over 200 km^{2} in area.

=== Mountains ===
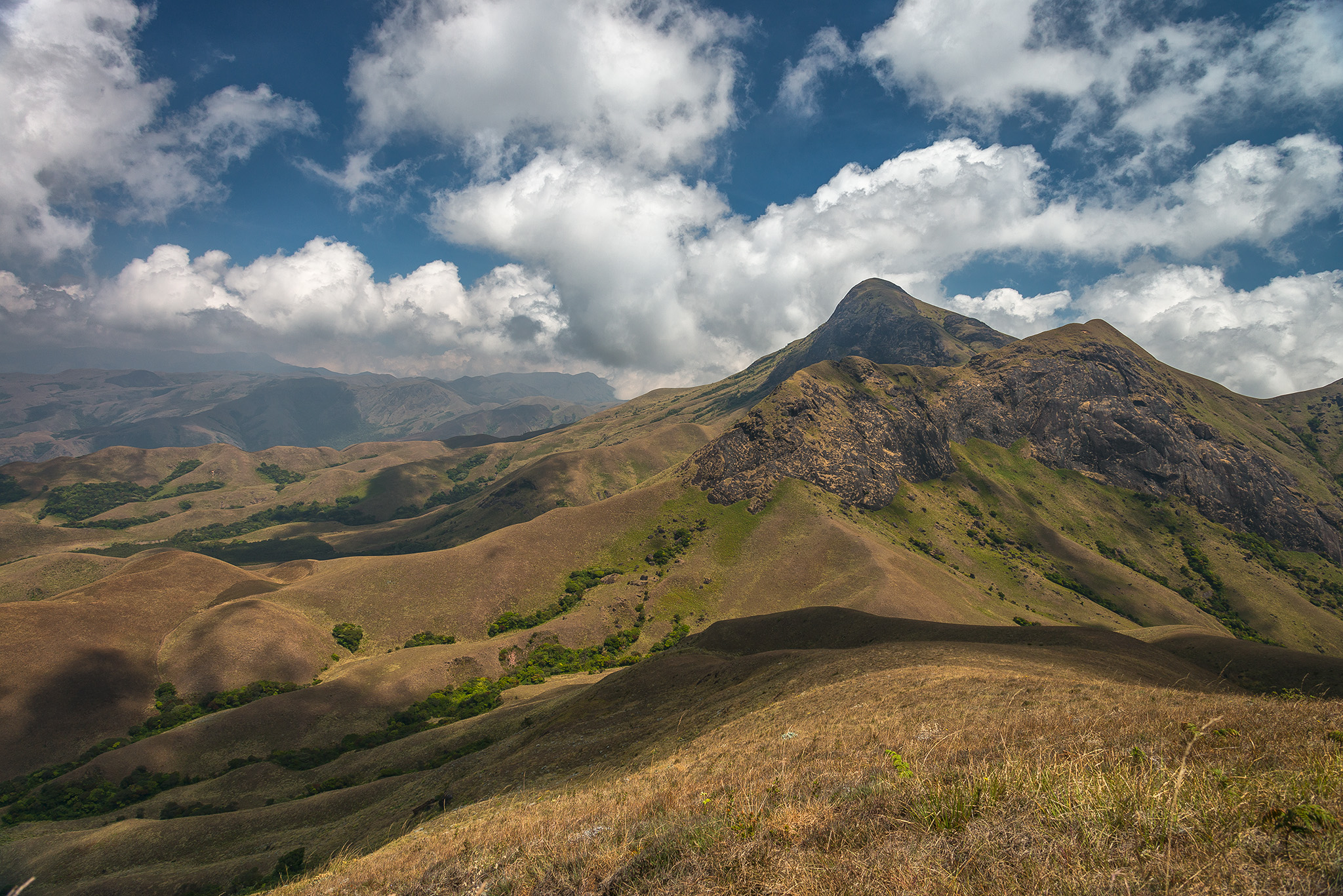
The peak of Anamudi in Kerala is the highest peak in the Western Ghats, as well as the highest in India outside the Himalayas

The Western Ghats is a continuous mountain range of 450 km along the eastern side of Kerala. It forms almost an unbroken wall guarding the eastern frontier and helps the people of Kerala to lead a sheltered life of their own through the centuries. The Western Ghats is also responsible for the high and steady rainfall in Kerala. It converts 50% of Kerala into highlands and is studded with more than 50 peaks above 5000 feet above Mean Sea Level. With a height of 8841 feet (2,695 metres), Anamudi is the highest peak in India outside Himalayas. Anamudi is located in Idukki district in Kerala. The Athirappilly Falls, which is situated on the background of Western Ghat mountain ranges, is also known as The Niagara of India. It originates from the peak of Anamudi and is also the largest waterfall in the state.

== Natural Hazards in Kerala ==
Districts and multi-hazard zones of Kerala

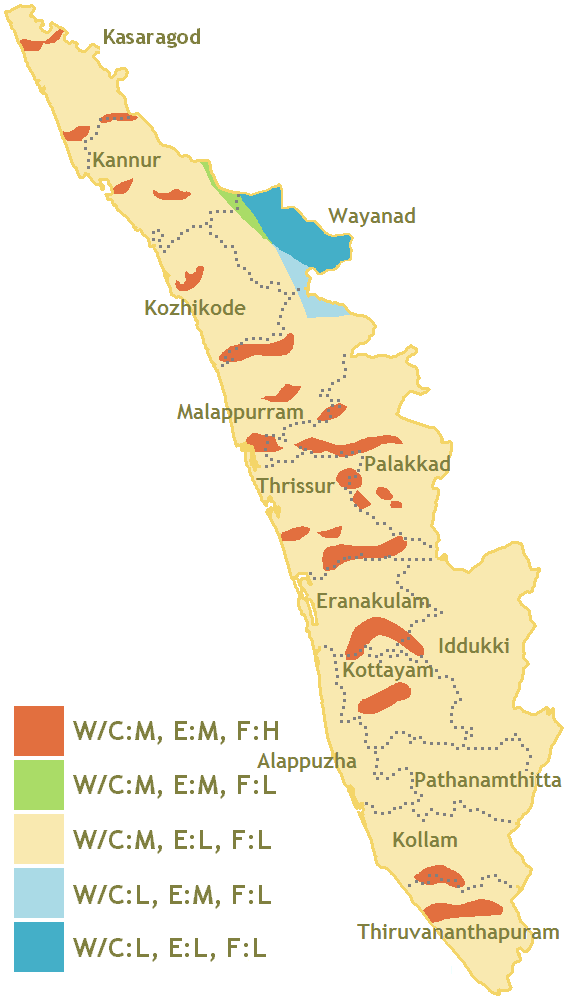
Multi-hazard map of Kerala.

The districts of Kerala shaded by the risk faced from cyclonic winds (denoted as "W/C"), earthquakes ("E"), and catastrophic flooding ("F"). Risk levels range from high ("H") to medium ("M") to low/none ("L").
Source: (UNDP 2002).

Kerala is prone to several natural hazards, the most common of them being landslides, flooding, lightning, drought, coastal erosion, earthquakes, Tsunami, wind fall and epidemics.

=== Landslides ===
The highlands of Kerala experience several types of landslides, of which debris flows are the most common. They are called 'Urul Pottal' in the local vernacular. The characteristic pattern of this phenomenon is the swift and sudden downslope movement of highly water saturated overburden containing a varied assemblage of debris material ranging in size from soil particles to boulders, destroying and carrying with it every thing that is lying in its path. The west facing Western Ghats scarps that runs the entire extent of the mountain system is the most prone physiographic unit for landslides. These scarp faces are characterised by thin soil (regolith) cover modified heavily by anthropogenic activity. The highlands of the region experience an annual average rainfall as high as 500 cm from the South-West, North-East and Pre-Monsoon showers. A review of ancient documents, investigation reports and news paper reports indicates a lesser rate of slope instability in the past; 29 major landslide events that occurred in the recent past was identified through the review. The processes leading to landslides were accelerated by anthropogenic disturbances such as deforestation since the early 18th century, terracing and obstruction of ephemeral streams and cultivation of crops lacking capability to add root cohesion in steep slopes. The events have become more destructive given the increasing vulnerability of population and property. Majority of mass movements have occurred in hill slopes >20° along the Western Ghats scarps, the only exception being the coastal cliffs. Studies conducted in the state indicates that prolonged and intense rainfall or more particularly a combination of the two and the resultant persistence and variations of pore pressure are the most important trigger of landslides. The initiation of most of the landslides were in typical hollows generally having degraded natural vegetation. All except 1 of the 14 districts in the state are prone to landslides. Wayanad and Kozhikode districts are prone to deep-seated landslides while Idukki and Kottayam are prone to shallow landslides. A very recent study indicates that the additional cohesion provided by vegetation roots in soil is an important contributor to slope stability in the scarp faces of the Western Ghats of Kerala.

=== Flooding ===
Although the Kerala state does not experience floods as severe as in the Indo-Gangetic Plain, incidence of floods in the State is becoming more frequent and severe. The latest among them was the 2020 Kerala floods. The continuous occurrence of high intensity rainfall for a few days is the primary factor contributing to the extreme floods in the State. Other factors include wrong land use practices and mismanagement of the water resources and forests. The human interventions contributing to flood problems are predominantly in the form of reclamation of wetlands and water bodies, change in land use pattern, construction of dense networks of roads, establishment of more and more settlements, deforestation in the upper catchments etc. Increasing floodplain occupancy results in increasing flood damages. A number of extreme flood events occurred during the last century causing considerable damage to a vast number of life and property highlight the necessity for proper flood management measures in the State. The flood problems are likely to worsen with the continued floodplain occupancy and reclamation of water bodies and wetlands. It is estimated that about 26% of the total geographical area accommodating about 18% of the total population of the State is prone to floods.

=== Lightning ===
Kerala is a place of high lightning incidence compared to most of the other parts in India because of its weather patterns and the location of the Western Ghats. Higher population density and vegetation density result in more casualties. Lack of awareness also aggravates the situation. Accidents caused by ground conduction from trees, which is a special feature of Kerala, add to the casualties and loss of property. The records show that the months April, May, October and November have the highest lightning rates. The most active time of the day is from 15:00 to 19:00. Of the fourteen districts, five have much higher rates than others. The severe impact of the hazard on the state and its people is seen from the very high average casualty rates of 71 deaths, 112 injuries and 188 accidents per annum. Losses to telephone communications, networked systems and electrical equipment are also very high.

=== Drought ===
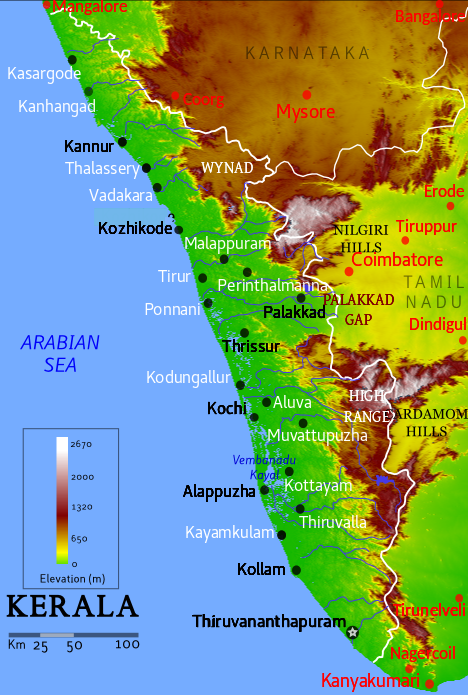
Topographic map showing major cities

Kerala has been experiencing increasing incidents of drought in the recent past due to the weather anomalies and developmental pressures resulting from the changes in land use, traditional practices, and life style of the people. The increase in population and subsequent expansion in irrigated agriculture, and industrial growth necessitated the exploitation of more water resources. The changes in the land and water management practices affected the fresh water availability during summer months. Although the deviation in the annual rainfall received in Kerala, in any year from the long term average is very small, there is considerable variation in the rainfall availability during the different seasons. About 95 percent of annual rainfall is confined to a six-month monsoon period between June and November, leaving the remaining six months as practically dry. Soman (1988) reported that over major part of the Kerala State, extreme as well as these where the rainfall is more compared to other areas. The changes in rainfall pattern may have association with the environmental modifications due to human interventions on the natural ecosystems. The State of Kerala experiences seasonal drought conditions every year during the summer months. Even in the years of normal rainfall, summer water scarcity problems are severe in the midland and highland regions. Severe drought conditions often result from the anomalies in monsoon rainfall combined with the various anthropogenic pressures. A study on the incidence of droughts based on the aridity index shows that during the period 1871– 2000, the State of Kerala experienced 66 drought years, out of which, twelve each were moderate and severe droughts. The droughts have a large dimension of economic, environmental and social impacts. With the implementation of a number of irrigation projects, the idea of drought in Kerala slowly shifted to unirrigated paddy, and upland crops. The water scarcity in summer is mainly reflected in dry rivers and lowering of water table. This adversely affects the rural and urban drinking water supply. As seen in the majority of drought incidents, even a 20% fall in the northeast monsoon, can make the water scarcity situation worse during the summer. Since the State has more of perennial plantation crops compared to other places of India, the effect of a drought year in Kerala continues to be felt for several more years after it has occurred. Thus, for better planning of the drought management measures, the term drought with reference to plantation crops should be redefined based on rainfall received or available soil moisture during summer months instead of total monsoon rainfall.

=== Tsunami ===
The Kerala coast was significantly affected by the 2004 Indian Ocean tsunami. The coast located in the shadow zone with respect to the direction of propagation of the tsunami encountered unexpected devastation. Although the tsunami affected parts of Kerala coast, maximum devastation was reported in the low coastal land of Kollam, Alappuzha and Ernakulam districts, particularly a strip of 10 km in Azhikkal, Kollam district. This varying effect along the coast could be attributed to local amplification of tsunami waves in certain regions. About 176 people were killed and 1600 injured in the coastal belt. Further, the tsunami pounded 187 villages affecting nearly 250,000 persons in Kerala. As many as 6,280 dwelling units were completely destroyed, 11,175 were damaged and nearly 84,773 persons were evacuated from the coastal areas and accommodated in 142 relief camps after tsunami. As this tsunami is believed to be first of its kind to have significantly affected the Kerala coast, the post-tsunami field investigations and measurements would give valuable information on various changes brought by the tsunami. Immediately after the tsunami, several organizations have carried out field surveys in many affected areas along the coast.

== See also ==
- El Niño
