= Chittarikkal =

- Town
- Location in Kerala, India Chittarikkal (India)
- Coordinates: 12.323360°N 75.358340°E
- Country: India
- State: Kerala
- District: Kasaragod

Government
  - Type: Village

Area
  - Total: 32.65 km^{2} (12.61 sq mi)

Population (2011)
  - Total: 15,152
  - Density: 464.1/km^{2} (1,202/sq mi)

Languages
- Time zone: UTC+5:30 (IST)
- ISO 3166 code: IN-KL
- Vehicle registration: KL-60, KL-79
- Nearest city: Nileshwar
- Nearest railway station: Nileshwar

Chittarikkal is a town in Vellarikundu Taluk in Kasaragod district in the state of Kerala, India. It is also a ward of the East Eleri Gram Panchayat. The town is sometimes referred to as Thomapuram, due to the name of the church and the nearby secondary school.

== Demographics ==
As of the 2011 Indian census, Chittarikkal had a population of 15,152: 7,398 male and 7,754 female. The village had a land area of 3265 hectares containing 3726 households. The village had a literacy rate of 86%.
