= Elerithattu =

- Village
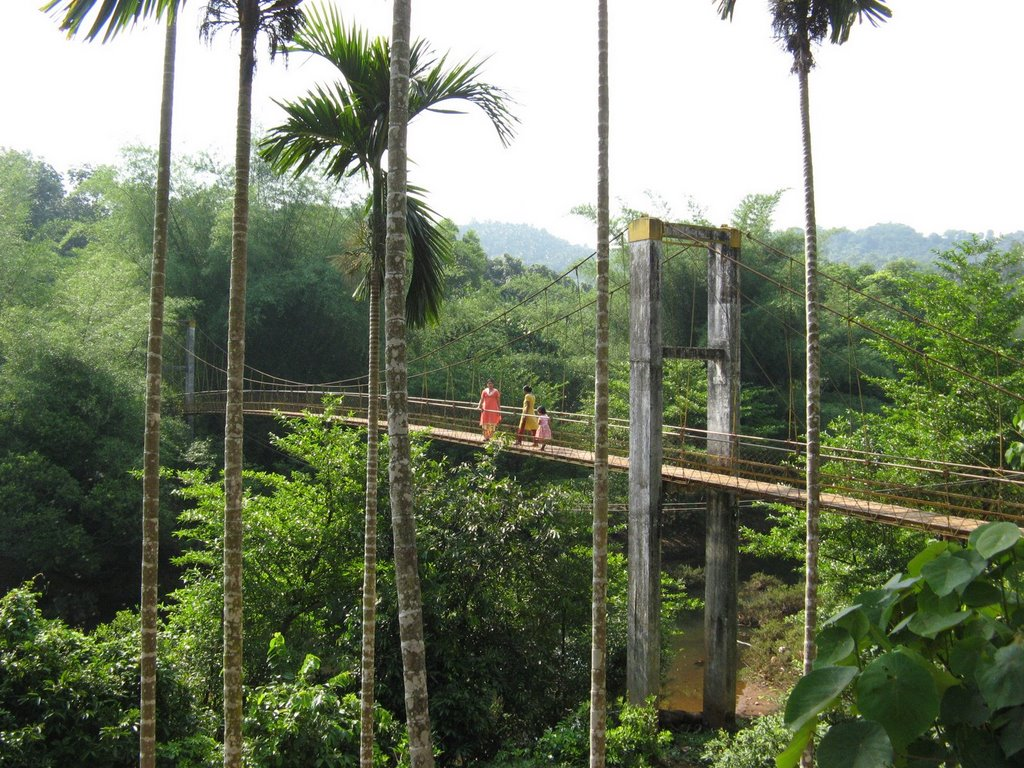
- The hanging spring bridge over the Bheemanadi in West Elerithattu.
- Interactive map of Elerithattu
- Coordinates: 12°20′0″N 75°18′0″E
- Country: India
- State: Kerala
- District: Kasargod

Languages
  - Official: Malayalam, English
- Time zone: UTC+5:30 (IST)
- Postal code: 671326
- Vehicle registration: KL- 79

Elerithattu village is located in West Eleri panchayat. It is about 30 km east of Nileshwar in the Kasaragod district of Kerala in India. The settlement is situated in a forested environment.

The village has E K Nayanar Memorial Government College.

== See also ==
- Hosdurg Taluk
