= Thayanur, Tiruchirappalli district =

Thayanur
- village
- Country: India
- State: Tamil Nadu
- District: Tiruchirappalli

Population (2001)
  - Total: 8,402

Languages
  - Official: Tamil
- Time zone: UTC+5:30 (IST)

Thayanur is a village in the Srirangam taluk of Tiruchirappalli district in Tamil Nadu, India.

== Demographics ==
As per the 2001 census, Thayanur had a population of 8,402 with 4,140 males and 4,262 females. The sex ratio was 1029 and the literacy rate, 65.72.
