= Bheemanady =

- village
- Location in Kerala, India Bheemanady (India)
- Coordinates: 12°19′0″N 75°17′0″E
- Country: India
- State: Kerala
- District: Kasaragod

Government
  - Body: West Eleri Grama Panchayat

Area
  - Total: 41.98 km^{2} (16.21 sq mi)

Population (2011)
  - Total: 15,688
  - Density: 373.7/km^{2} (967.9/sq mi)

Languages
  - Official: Malayalam, English
- Time zone: UTC+5:30 (IST)
- Vehicle registration: KL-79

Bheemanady is a village in Kasaragod district in the state of Kerala, India.

== Demographics ==
As of 2011 Census, Bheemanady had a population of 15,688 with 7,582 males and 8,106 females. Bheemanady village has an area of 41.98 km^{2} (16.21 sq mi) with 3,625 families residing in it. 11.3% of the population was under 6 years of age. Bheemanady village had an average literacy of 91.6% higher than the national average of 74% and lower than state average of 94%.

== Transportation ==
The national highway passing through Nileshwaram connects to Mangalore in the north and Kannur in the south. The nearest railway station is Nileshwar on Mangalore-Palakkad line. There are airports at Mangalore and Kannur.
