= Balal =

- village
- Location in Kerala, India Balal (India)
- Coordinates: 12.385660°N 75.281970°E
- Country: India
- State: Kerala
- District: Kasaragod

Government
  - Type: Panchayati Raj (India)
  - Body: Balal Grama Panchayat

Area
  - Total: 37.24 km^{2} (14.38 sq mi)

Population (2011)
  - Total: 9,936
  - Density: 266.8/km^{2} (691.0/sq mi)

Languages
  - Official: Malayalam, English
- Time zone: UTC+5:30 (IST)
- Vehicle registration: KL-

Balal is a village and a Grama Panchayat in Kasaragod district in the state of Kerala, India.

== Demographics ==
As of 2011 Census, Balal had a population of 9,936 with 4,885 males and 5,051 females. Balal village has an area of 37.24 km^{2} (14.38 sq mi) with 2,415 families residing in it. In Balal, 9.84% of the population was under 6 years of age. Balal village had an average literacy of 87.66% lower than the state average of 94%: male literacy was 90.58% and female literacy was 84.87%.

=== State Government Offices ===
- Balal Sub Registrar's Office
- Balal Govt Higher Secondary School, Balal Village Office Balal Krishi Bhavan Balal grama panchayath Balal home dispensary

== Transportation ==
This village is connected to Karnataka state through Panathur. Its nearest town is Vellarikundu. There is a 20-km road from Panathur to Sullia in Karnataka from where Bangalore and Mysore can be easily accessed. Locations in Kerala can be accessed by driving towards the western side. The nearest railway station is Kanhangad on Shoranur-Mangalore Section under Southern railway. The nearest airports are Kannur in the south and Mangalore in the north.
