= Nileshwar railway station =

Railway station in Kerala, India

Nileshwar
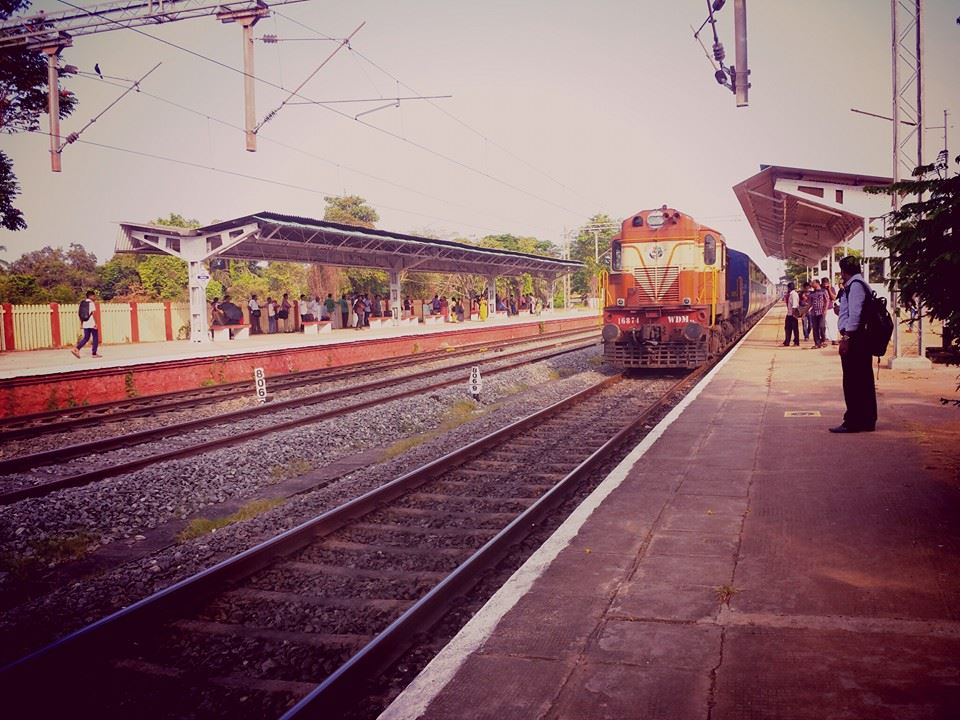

General information
- Location: Railway Station Road, Nileshwar, Kasaragod, Kerala; India
- Coordinates: 12.256158°N 75.135748°E
- System: Indian Railways station
- Owner: indian railway
- Operator: southern railway
- Platforms: 3
- Tracks: 6
- Connections: Bus stand, Taxicab stand, Auto rickshaw stand

Construction
- Structure type: Standard (on-ground station)
- Parking: Yes
- Accessible: overbridge with lift

Other information
- Status: Functioning
- Station code: NLE
- Zone(s): Southern Railway
- Division(s): Palakkad

History
- Opened: 1861
- Closed: no
- Rebuilt: coming soon
- Former names: nileshwar
Location
- Location within Kerala Location within India

Nileshwar railway station (station code: NLE) is an NSG–5 category Indian railway station in Palakkad railway division of Southern Railway zone. It is a railway station serving the town of Nileshwar in the Kasaragod District of Kerala. It lies in the Shoranur–Mangalore section of the Southern Railways. The station has two platforms and six tracks. Trains halting at the station connect the town to prominent cities in India such as Thiruvananthapuram, Kochi, Chennai, Kollam, Kozhikode, Coimbatore, Mangalore, New Delhi, Nagercoil, Kacheguda, Bangalore, Kanyakumari and Mumbai.
