= Thabore =

- village
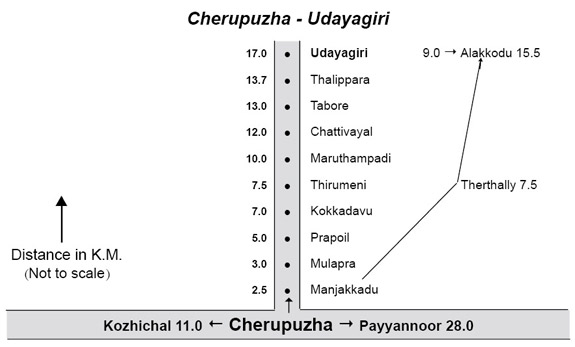
- Route map
- Interactive map of Thabore
- Coordinates: 12°15′0″N 75°27′0″E
- Country: India
- State: Kerala
- District: Kannur

Languages
  - Official: Malayalam, English
- Time zone: UTC+5:30 (IST)
- PIN: 670511
- Telephone code: 04602
- ISO 3166 code: IN-KL
- Vehicle registration: KL 59
- Literacy: 99%

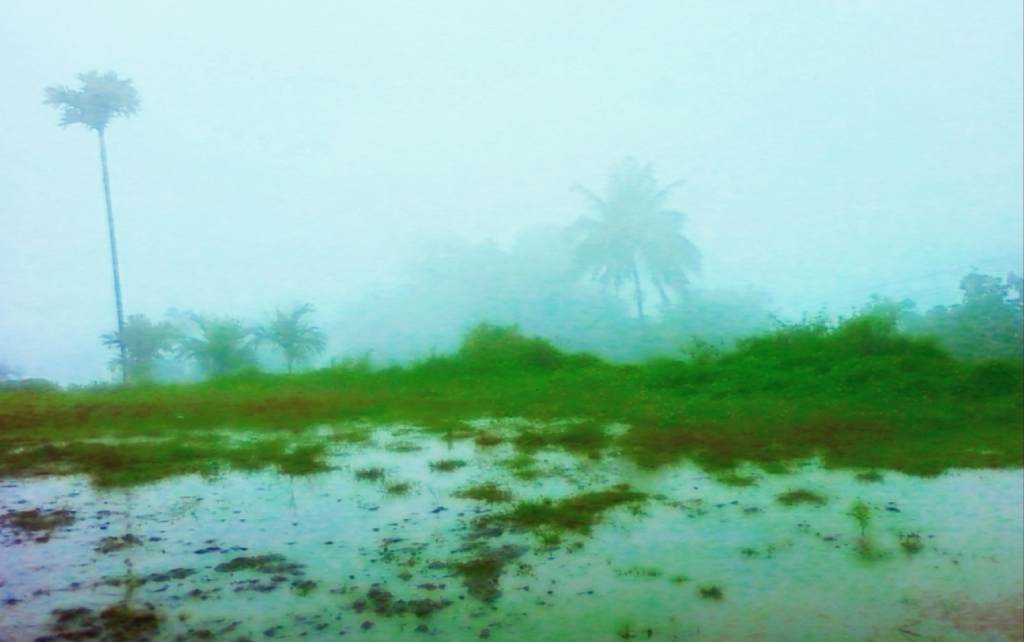
Thabore Hills

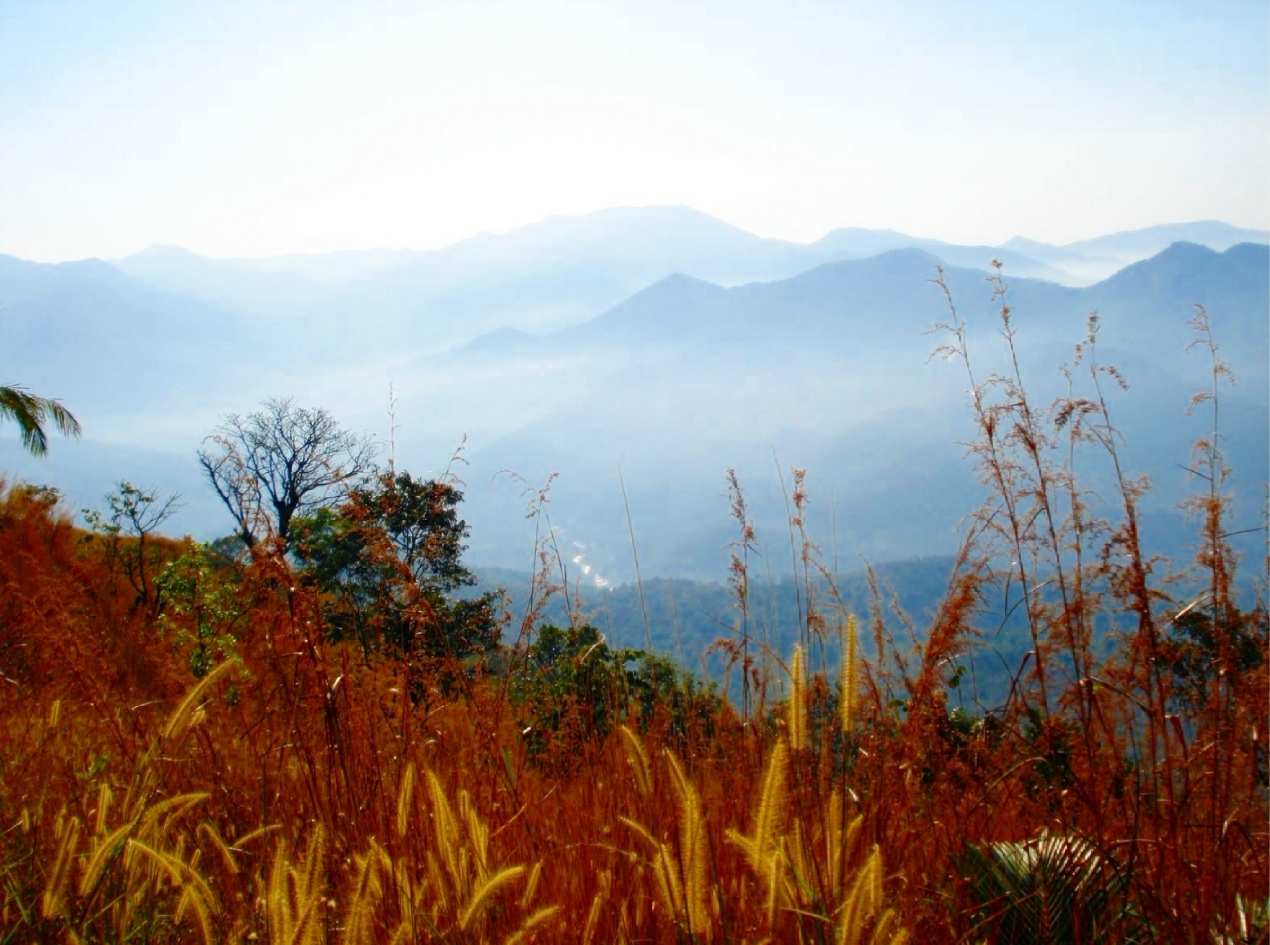
Scenery from Thabore

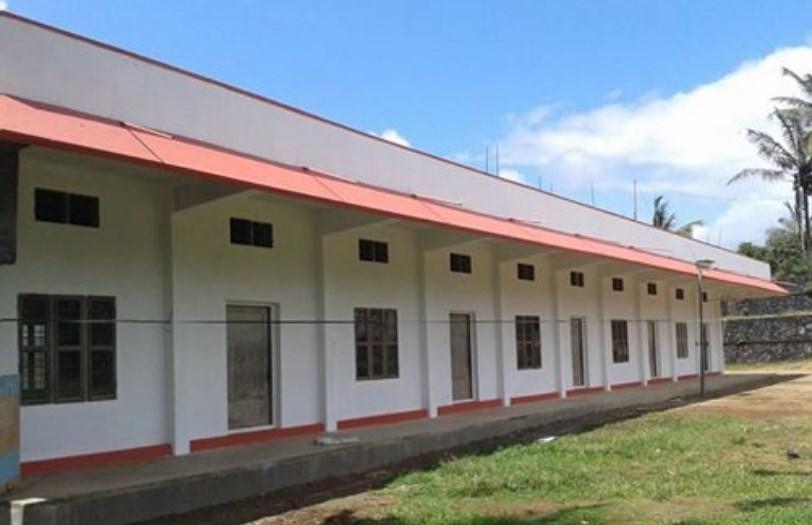
St Josephs LP School Thabore

Thabore is a hill top village in Kannur district in the Indian state of Kerala. Some parts of Thabore comes under Udayagiri gram panchayat and the rest under Cherupuzha gram panchayat. Tourists come here to see the scenery of the hill station. A statue of Jesus Christ has been recently? installed on the hilltop which attracts a large number of tourists. Nearby places include Udayagiri, Thirumeni, Chathamangalam (Kannur) and Kozhichal.

The altitude is about 500 m above sea level. Temperature ranges from a minimum of 13 °C to a maximum of 28 °C. Warm clothes and rain gear is recommended in monsoon and winter seasons. People here are mostly Christians and Hindus. Most people are engaged in agriculture. This area exports hill products: rubber, dry copra, pepper, arecanut, etc. to industries in the northern part of India. It is a place where a huge number of people migrated during the 1940s and '50s from the Travancore area; now they play a major role in the local economy. The villagers are also politically interested. The main political parties are Communist Party of India (Marxist), Indian National Congress, Kerala Congress and BJP.

It is approximately 60 km from district center, Kannur town.

The nearest towns are cherupuzha and alakode which is 13 km away and udayagiri about 4 km away from thabore.

== Migration from the south ==
The famine after World War II and the misrule of Sir. C. P. Ramaswamy Iyer incited a large scale migration of people from Travancore (South Kerala) to this area. The migration continued well into the 1970s and 1980s. A vast majority of these migrants were Christians who had a completely different social and agricultural background. These hard working people brought new agricultural practices to this area. They introduced cash crops like rubber and daily staples like tapioca to the region.

The migrants also brought a new attitude to the region, one that challenged the established Janmi-Kudian feudal system. The migrants bought large tracts of land outright from the Janmis and put down permanent crops heralding an era of prosperity for the area. The immigrants, despite their cultural and social difference, soon became an integral part of social fabric.

== Early farming methods ==
Until the early 1950s, this region used outdated agricultural practices and depended on the Indian monsoons for its irrigation needs. Agricultural land lay fallow after harvest. At the beginning of the next growing season, the bushes that cover the land would be cleared and the plant material burned to prepare the land for the next cycle of rice cultivation. This method, known as 'punam krishi' allowed people to grow staples like rice and black gram.

== How to reach Thabore ==
Thabore is 60 km from Kannur and 44 km from Payyanur. Buses ply from Kannur via Alakode and Payyanur via Cherupuzha are available.

The national highway passes through Payyanur town. Goa and Mumbai can be accessed on the northern side and Cochin and Thiruvananthapuram can be accessed on the southern side. Taliparamba has a good bus station and buses are easily available to all parts of Kannur district. The road to the east of Iritty connects to Mysore and Bangalore. But buses to these cities are available only from Kannur, 22 km to the south. The nearest railway stations are Kannapuram and Kannur on Mangalore-Palakkad line. Trains are available to almost all parts of India subject to advance booking over the internet. There are airports at Kannur, Mangalore and Calicut. All of them are small international airports with direct flights available only to Middle Eastern countries.

== Education ==
St.Joseph's L.P School is a day school for boys & girls, was established in 80's. It is an international institute especially devoted to the education of young kids.

This institution is open to girls and boys of all communities, irrespective of status, castes, creed and religion.

Physical Training, Social, Cultural and other extracurricular activities are given adequate place in the children's education to make them disciplined and worthy citizens. Moral Education, taught to all children, aims at inculcating in them right values and attitudes.

== St. Joseph’s Church ==
St. Joseph's Church was established in 1974 by the Christians (the Syro-Malabar Church) who migrated from Travancore. The church in its present form was built in the nineties. This church comes under Cherupuzha forane, Syro-Malabar Catholic Archeparchy of Tellicherry. The Archdiocese of Tellicherry is an ecclesiastical province of the Syro-Malabar Church in Kerala, India. The Diocese of Tellicherry was erected on 31 December 1953 by the papal bull Ad Christi Ecclesiam regendam of Pope Pius XII, against the backdrop of large-scale migration of thousands of Syro-Malabar Catholics from South to the Northern forestlands of Kerala. The boundaries of the diocese were extended in 1955 to some districts in the states of Karnataka and Tamil Nadu, for the pastoral care of the migrants settled there. The diocese grew fast and became a stronghold of the Catholic Church in this region within a short period. The diocese was bifurcated in 1973, and the diocese of Mananthavady was erected. Again, the Diocese of Tellicherry was bifurcated twice, in 1986 to form the diocese of Thamarassery and in 1999 to form the diocese of Belthangady. The diocese was raised to the stature of metropolitan archdiocese by the papal bull Spirituali bono Christi fidelium of Pope John Paul II in 1995. Bishop Mar Sebastian Valloppilly was the first bishop of the Diocese of Tellicherry. The archdiocese enjoyed the gracious leadership of Archbishop Mar George Valiamattam from 1 May 1989 to 30 October 2014. On 30 October 2014 he resigned and Archbishop Mar George Njaralakatt was installed as the new Archbishop of Tellicherry. He assumed office on the same day.

== Chathamangalam Hills ==
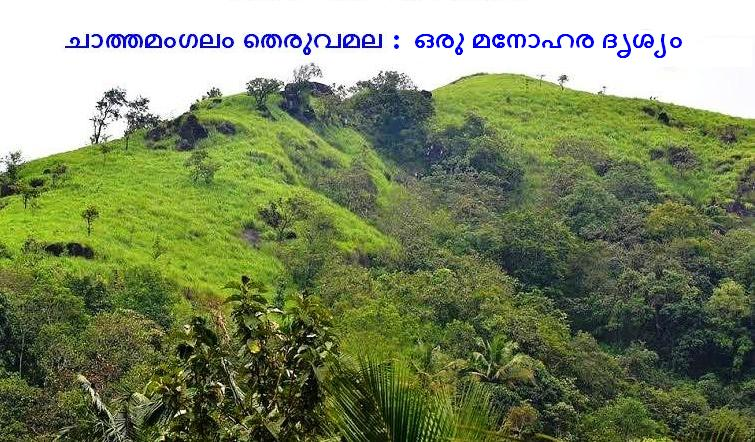
Chathamangalam Theruvamala

Chathamangalam Hills is a hill station situated very close to Tabore and has its boundaries overlapping with the Munderithattu region, the border between Chathamangalam and Tabore. Chathamangalam-Cherimavu-Tabore road connects Thabore to the Chathamangalam hills also known as Theruvamala and Alumbumala. Protection of the region from land mafiya is important to the people of Tabore too. Earlier an action committee was formed at Thabore with the same intention.

== Kottathalachi Mount ==
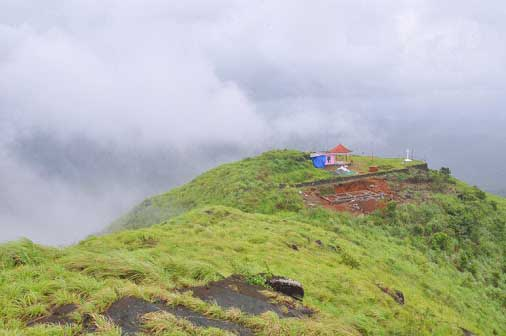
Kottathalachi Mount

Kottathalachi Mount is a Christian pilgrim centre in north Kerala. It is located at around 2,500 feet above sea level. On Good Friday of 1958, the holy cross was installed at "Kottathalachi Mala" by Fr. Mathew Mannuramparambil. Since then the first Sunday after Easter is being celebrated here by thousands of pilgrims every year.

At present there is road facility until the middle of the mountain (Anakuzhi). One has to reach Pulingome, which is a small village town in Cherupuzha Panchayat, to take the shortest and easiest trip to Mount Kottathalachi.

Kottathalachi is known as the "Malayattoor of Malabar".
