= Josegiri =

- village
- Location in Kerala, India
- Coordinates: 12.2727°N 75.4707°E
- Country: India
- State: Kerala
- District: Kannur
- Taluk: Payyanur

Government
  - Body: Cherupuzha Grama Panchayat

Languages
  - Official: Malayalam, English
- Time zone: UTC+5:30 (IST)
- PIN: 670511
- Telephone code: 04985
- Vehicle registration: KL-86
- Nearest Towns: Karthikapuram (6.5 km), Pulingome (12 km), Alakode (14 km), Cherupuzha (18 km)
- Lok Sabha constituency: Kasaragod
- Vidhan Sabha constituency: Payyanur
- Climate: Moderate (Köppen)

Josegiri is a village in the northeastern side of Kannur district in the Indian state of Kerala. The village is bordered by the forest areas of Karnataka. Josegiri is part of Cherupuzha grama panchayat and comes under Pulingome revenue village in Payyanur taluk. The major source of income for the people is agriculture. There is only one primary school here, St. Joseph's UP School established in 1976.

Josegiri is well known for its natural beauty, and the hilltop viewpoint Thirunettikkallu attracts visitors here.

== Transportation ==
Josegiri is accessible mainly through two roads—the Rajagiri–Josegiri Road and the Josegiri–Udayagiri Road. The former connects the village to Pulingome, Cherupuzha and neighbouring villages and towns via the Payyanur–Rajagiri Major District Road, while the latter connects it to the Taliparamba–Coorg border road, linking to Udayagiri, Alakode and nearby villages and towns. The nearest towns are Karthikapuram, Pulingome, Alakode and Cherupuzha, located at a distance of 6.5 km (4.0 mi), 12 km (7.5 mi), 14 km (8.7 mi) and 18 km (11 mi) respectively.

The nearest railway station is at Payyanur of about 52 km (32 mi) from here.

The nearest international airport is at Kannur of about 60 km (37 mi) away.
