= Kariangode River =

River in India

Kariankode River Tejaswini River
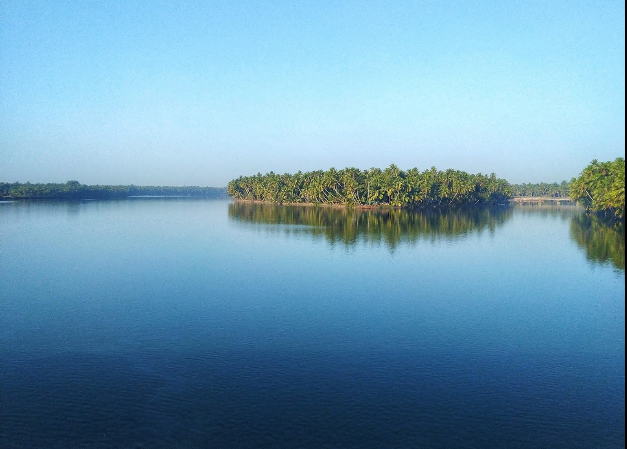

Location
- Country: India
- States: Kerala, Karnataka
- District: Kasaragod, Kannur, Kodagu
- Towns: Pulingome, Cherupuzha, Kayyur, Nileshwaram

Physical characteristics
- Source: Padinalkad Ghat Reserve Forest, Karnataka
  - location: Kodagu District, India
  - coordinates: 12.37662°N 75.47913°E
  - elevation: 1,520 m (4,990 ft)
- Mouth: Arabian Sea
  - location: Near Thuruthy, Nileshwaram, India
  - coordinates: 12.200817°N 75.121006°E
  - elevation: 0 m (0 ft)
- Length: 64 km (40 mi)
- Basin size: 561 km (349 mi)

Basin features
- Tributaries
  - left: Chaithravahini River
  - right: Pulingome River

Kariankode River also known as Tejaswini River is one among the 44 rivers flowing through Kerala state. Kariankode River is a major river that forms the boundary between Kasaragod district and Kannur district of Kerala state. It is also the second largest river in Kasaragod district running through the hills and dales of Vellarikundu, Hosdurg and Payyanur Taluks. Places like Pulingome, Cherupuzha, Kakkadavu, Perumbatta, Mukkada, Kayyur, Kilayikode and Andol are situated at the bank of this river.

== Origin ==
Kariangode River originates from the western slopes of Talakaveri Wildlife Sanctuary region of the Western Ghats in Kodagu district, in the state of Karnataka.

== Tributaries ==
- The upper headwaters are fed mainly by the Mundore, Padimalahole and Ariakkadavuhole tributaries. Originating in the Coorg hills of Karnataka, these small mountain streams (hole denotes a stream in Kannada) unite in the forest to form the source of the Kariangode River.
- As the Kariangode River flows through Kerala, its lower stretches are joined by two major tributaries — the Chaithravahini and Pulingome rivers.

== Tourism ==
Adventure tourism activities are conducted on the Kariangode River, also known as the Tejaswini River. White-water rafting is conducted on stretches of the Kariangode River, near Cherupuzha in Kannur district. A 12.5 km section is used for rafting during the monsoon and post-monsoon periods. Rafts typically carry 6 to 7 participants and are operated by trained guides. The activity is managed by licensed operators under safety protocols set by local authorities.

== Bridges on Kariangode River ==
There are many bridges over Kariangode river. The main bridges include Pulingome bridge, Cherupuzha bridge, Kollada bridge, Kakadavu bridge, Perumbatta bridge, Mukkada bridge, Arayakadav bridge, Andol Poorakkadav hanging bridge, Kariangode bridge and Kottapuram bridge.
