= Chathamangalam (Kannur) =

Chathamangalam (ചാത്തമംഗലം)
- Village
- Location in Kerala, India Chathamangalam (ചാത്തമംഗലം) (India)
- Coordinates: 12°14′44.1″N 75°26′50.7″E
- Country: India
- State: Kerala
- District: Kannur

Languages
  - Official: Malayalam, English
- Time zone: UTC+5:30 (IST)
- PIN: 670511
- Telephone code: 04985-
- ISO 3166 code: IN-KL
- Vehicle registration: KL-59-
- Nearest city: Payyannur
- Lok Sabha constituency: Kasaragod

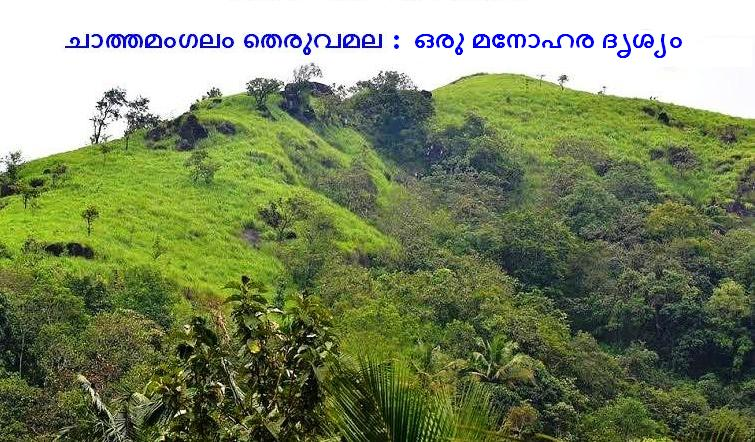
Chathamangalam Theruvamala

Chathamangalam (Malayalam: ചാത്തമംഗലം), also known as Chathamangalam Hills, Kannur Theruvamala or just Theruvamala, is a hill station village and trekking spot in Kannur district, Kerala, India alongside the Coorg border of the neighbouring Karnataka state, which consists of a vast plain of green grasslands that made it earn the nickname Evergreen Chathamangalam. It is located in the border of Cherupuzha, Alakode and Udayagiri Grama Panchayats.

Chathamangalam is situated almost 58 kilometers away from the district headquarters. Nearby major towns, namely Taliparamba and Payyannur, are at a distance of 35 and 40 kilometers respectively from Chathamangalam. Two major mountains in the region, namely Theruvamala and Thevarkunnumala, have an altitude of approximately 2500 meters from the sea level.

Places like Thirumeni, Thabore, Cherupuzha, Prapoyil, Muthuvom, Padiyottuchal, Udayagiri, Karthikapuram, Parappa(Alakode), Neduvode, Rayarome and Alakode are visible from the hilltop.

== Route from Kannur/Kasaragod to Chathamangalam Theruvamala Hills ==
- Kannur-Taliparamba-Alakode-Neduvode-Chathamangalam (Theruvamala)
- Kannur-Payyannur-Cherupuzha-Thirumeni-Chathamangalam (Theruvamala)
- Kasaragod-Nileshwar-Cheemeni-Cherupuzha-Thirumeni-Chathamangalam (Theruvamala)
- Kanhangad-Kunnumkai-Chittarikkal-Cherupuzha-Thirumeni-Chathamangalam (Theruvamala)
- Vellarikundu-Bheemanadi-Chittarikkal-Cherupuzha-Thirumeni-Chathamangalam (Theruvamala)
- Iritty-Chemperi-Alakode-Neduvode-Chathamangalam (Theruvamala)
- Taliparamba-Alakode-Karthikapuram-Muthusseri-Thalathanni-Chathamangalam (Theruvamala)

One can get the location of Theruvamala on GOOGLE MAP by typing Chathamangalam (Kannur). Its geographical coordinates for GMAP is 12°14′44.1″N 75°26′50.7″E

== Chathamangalam Waterfalls ==
Apart from the Theruvamala, the Chathamangalam Waterfalls is a treat to the eyes as well. It is a seasonal waterfalls with significant water currents from the month of June to September, located near Chathamangalam-Neduvode road.

== Life and Culture ==
Most of the inhabitants of the village are farmers. Rubber, coconut, rambutan, cashew, cocoa, areca nut, pepper, nutmeg, coffee and vegetables are cultivated here in abundance.

People here are very much active in politics and religious activities. Political parties with good number of supporters include the Indian National Congress, CPI(M) and Kerala Congress(M). Most of the villagers belong to Syro-Malabar Catholic Church followed by Malankara Catholicism and Hinduism. The most celebrated festivities are Christmas, Onam, Easter and Vishu.

== Places in Chathamangalam ==
- Alumbu (അളുമ്പ്)
- Maruthumpadi (മരുതംപാടി)
- Devarkunnu (ദേവർകുന്ന്)
- Theruvamala (തെരുവമല)
- Assissi Nagar (അസ്സീസ്സി നഗർ)
- Pookkad (പൂക്കാട്)
- Cherimavu (ചേരിമാവ്‌)
- Munderithattu (മുണ്ടേരിത്തട്ട്)
- Thalathanni (തലത്തണ്ണി)

== Migration from Travancore ==
The famine after World War II and the misrule of Sir. C. P. Ramaswamy Iyer incited a large scale migration of people from Travancore (South Kerala) to this area. The migration continued well into the 1970s and 80s. A vast majority of these migrants were Christians who had a completely different social and agricultural background. These hard working people brought new agricultural practices to this area. They introduced cash crops like rubber and daily staples like tapioca to the region.

The migrants also brought a new attitude to the region, one that challenged the established Janmi-Kudian feudal system. The migrants bought large tracts of land outright from the Janmis and put down permanent crops heralding an era of prosperity for the area. The immigrants, despite their cultural and social difference, soon became an integral part of social fabric.

== Early farming methods ==
Until the early 1950s, this region used outdated agricultural practices and depended on the Indian monsoons for its irrigation needs. Agricultural land lay fallow after harvest. At the beginning of the next growing season, the bushes that cover the land would be cleared and the plant material burned to prepare the land for the next cycle of rice cultivation. This method, known as 'punam krishi' allowed people to grow staples like rice and black gram.

== Places of Worship ==
=== St.Jude's Chapel, Chathamangalam ===
St. Jude's Chapel is situated at the convergence of Theruvamala and Thevarkunnumala and is the combined worship place of Syro-Malankara and Syro-Malabar Christians residing in the area. Novena to St.Jude conducted in the church attract good number of pilgrims.

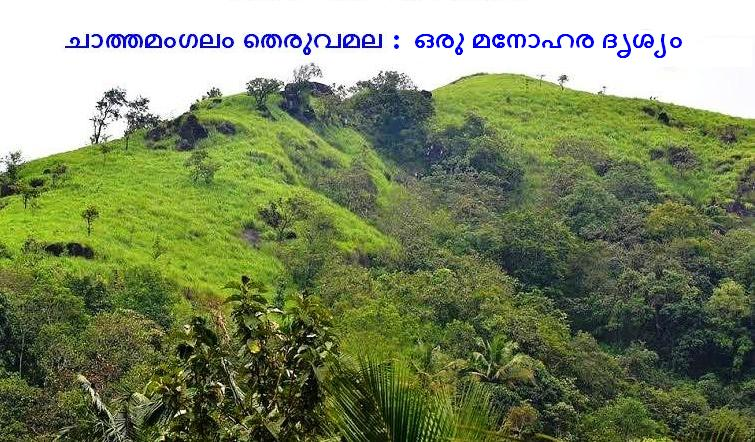
Chathamangalam Theruvamala

== Road Connectivity ==
- Thirumeni-Chathamangalam-Neduvode: 6.1 km
- Chathamangalam-Chattivayal: 2.5 km
