= Kozhichal =

Village in Kerala, India

Kozhichal is a small hillside town in the north eastern region of the district of Kannur in the Kerala state. Kozhichal shares its boundaries with Kodagu district of Karnataka state towards the east, rest of the Kannur district towards west and south and the district of Kasaragod towards north.

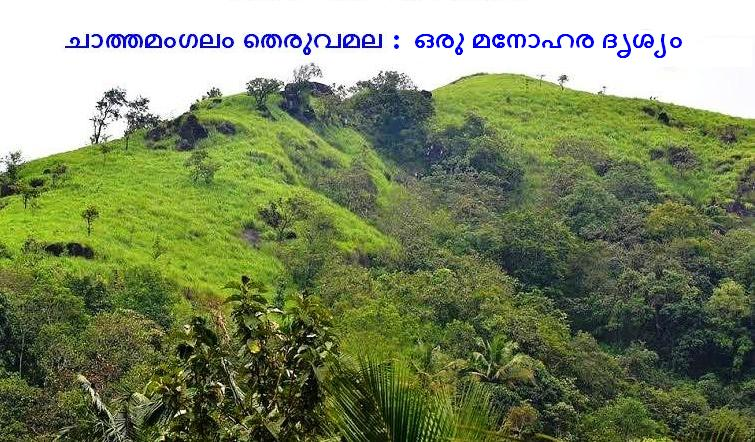
Chathamangalam Theruvamala

== Inception ==
Kozhichal came into existence during the Malabar migration, a large scale influx of mainly Syrian Christians from the early decades of 20th century through the end of 20th century to the northern districts of Kasaragod, Kannur, Kozhikode and Wayanad, most parts of which were uninhabited at that time. Kozhichal served as a hub for those migrated to the north eastern parts of Kannur district, with the towns of Pulingome Rajagiri (a near village) and Cherupuzha. The name of the town is credited (though still a matter of dispute among villagers) to the abundance of Chickens in the region and a river that passes through the town.

== Kozhichal today ==
Today the town houses a lower primary school (St. Augustine's LP School), a branch of the Kerala Gramin Bank, an office of the Indian postal department, a Roman Catholic church (St. Sebastien's Church of the Arch Diocese of Tellicherry) and a number of shops that cater to the various day-to-day needs of the villagers. The population of Kozhichal is mainly constituted by Christians. The language spoken is Malayalam despite the town's close proximity to the Kannada speaking district of Kodagu in the State of Karnataka. This is due to the situation that the border areas are not inhabited by humans. Both Christian as well Hindu migrants converse in the Travancore Dialect of Malayalam.

== Controversies ==
The town witnessed a few months of trouble as the Government Of India temporarily decided to go ahead with implementing the Kasthuri Rangan Report which deals with imposing strict rules on construction of new buildings, farming etc. in view of conserving the Western Ghats. The villagers protested against the government's decision locally, backed by the Catholic Church.

== Transport ==
Kozhichal is well connected with the nearest city of Payyanur by road which is situated 42 kilometers from Kozhichal. Several privately owned transport companies operate services to and from Kozhichal. The state run KSRTC also operates services through the town. The first bus service through the town was Rajagiri (town near kozhichal) To Kottayam KSRTC bus which connected the migrants to their home towns in the district of Kottayam. Auto Rikshaw is the most common local method of transport. The new Rajagiri (a town near kozhichal) -Cherupuzha hill highway through the town will be a new addition to the town's transport needs.
