= Padiyotchal =

Padiyotchal Padiyottuchal
- town
- Location in Kerala, India Padiyotchal (India)
- Coordinates: 12°15′10″N 75°20′8″E
- Country: India
- State: Kerala
- District: Kannur

Government
  - Type: Panchayat
  - Body: Peringome - Vayakkara Grama panchayat

Languages
  - Official: Malayalam, English
- Time zone: UTC+5:30 (IST)
- ISO 3166 code: IN-KL

Padiyotchal is a small town in Kannur district in the Indian state of Kerala.

== Location ==
It is 4.5 km from Cherupuzha, 26 kilometers east of the town of Payyanur, and about 65 kilometers north-east of the city of Kannur.

== Transportation ==
The national highway passes through Perumba junction. Goa and Mumbai can be accessed on the northern side and Cochin and Thiruvananthapuram can be accessed on the southern side. The road to the east of Iritty connects to Mysore and Bangalore. The nearest railway station is Payyanur on Mangalore-Palakkad line. Trains are available to almost all parts of India subject to advance booking over the internet. There are airports at Kannur, Mangalore and Calicut. All of them are international airports but direct flights are available only to Middle Eastern countries.
