= Thirumeni =

- village
- Location in Kerala Location in India
- Coordinates: 12°15′N 75°25′E
- Country: India
- State: Kerala
- District: Kannur

Government
  - Body: Cherupuzha Panchayat

Area
  - Total: 23.58 km^{2} (9.10 sq mi)

Population (2011)
  - Total: 8,611
  - Density: 365.2/km^{2} (945.8/sq mi)

Languages
  - Official: Malayalam, English
- Time zone: UTC+5:30 (IST)
- PIN: 670511
- Telephone code: 91-4985
- ISO 3166 code: IN-KL
- Nearest Town: Cherupuzha (8 km)
- Lok Sabha constituency: Kasaragod
- Vidhan Sabha constituency: Payyanur

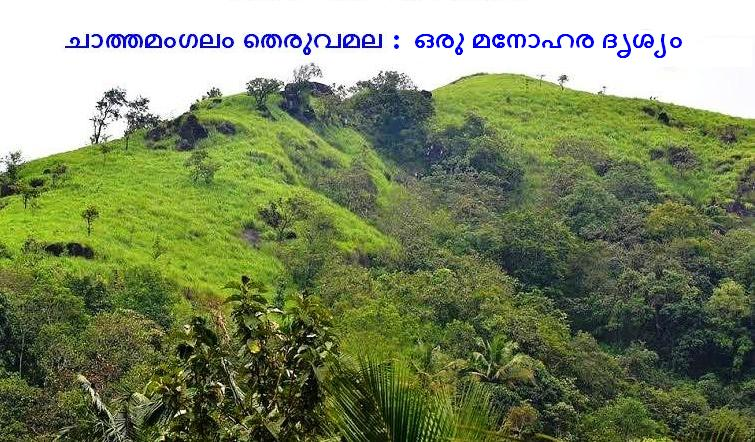
Chathamangalam Theruvamala

Thirumeni is a village in Kannur district in Kerala, India. It is subdivided into smaller villages, including Chathamangalam (Kannur).

== Demographics ==
As of 2011 census, Thirumeni village which spreads over 23.58 km^{2} (9.10 sq mi) area had population of 8,616 where 4,275 are males and 4,336 are females with 2,077 families residing in the village. Population of children in the age group of 0–6 was 793 (9.2%) which consists of 428 males and 365 females. Thirumeni had overall literacy of 96.2% where male literacy stands at 97.5% and female literacy was 95%.
