= Cherupuzha, Kannur =

Cherupuzha
- Town
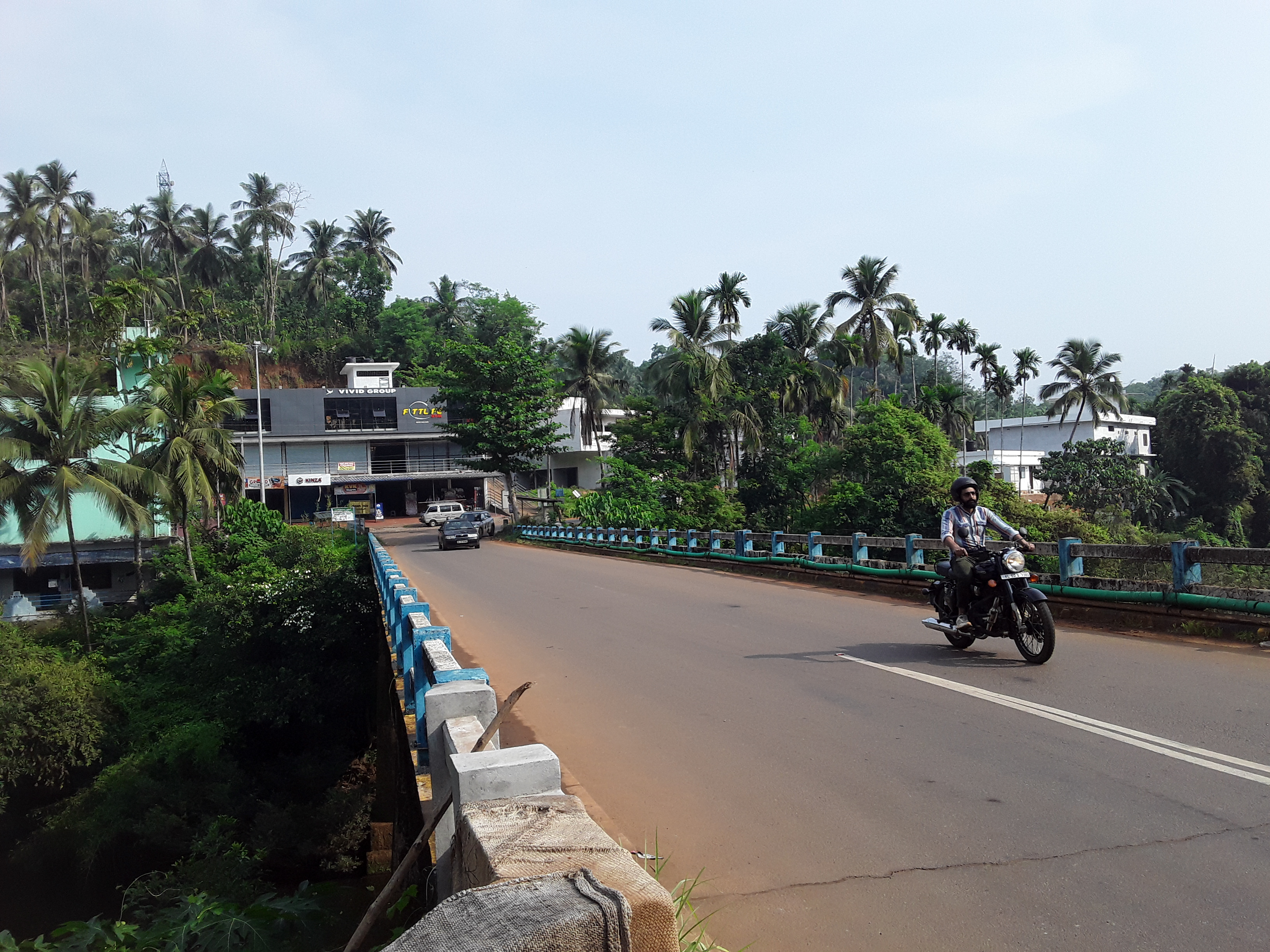
- Cherupuzha Bridge

- Location in Kerala, India Cherupuzha (India)
- Coordinates: 12.2728°N 75.3672°E
- Country: India
- State: Kerala
- District: Kannur
- Taluk: Payyanur

Government
  - Type: Panchayati raj (India)
  - Body: Grama Panchayat

Area
  - Total: 75.64 km^{2} (29.20 sq mi)
- Elevation: 46 m (151 ft)

Population (2011)
  - Total: 30,733
  - Density: 406.3/km^{2} (1,052/sq mi)

Languages
  - Official: Malayalam, English
- Time zone: UTC+5:30 (IST)
- PIN: 670511
- Telephone code: 04985
- ISO 3166 code: IN-KL
- Vehicle registration: KL 86
- Niyamasabha constituency: Payyanur
- Lok Sabha constituency: Kasaragod
- Nearest Railway station: Cheruvathur - 29 km Nileshwar - 32 km Payyanur - 34 km
- Website: www.lsgkerala.in/cherupuzhapanchayat

Cherupuzha is a town in Kannur district of Kerala, India, located on the northern edge of the district. It is the headquarters of the Cherupuzha grama panchayat which is a special grade panchayat in Kerala. The town lies on the banks of the Kariangode River, also known as Tejaswini River, which forms the border between Kannur and Kasaragod districts. Hill Highway or SH 59 passes through Cherupuzha town.

== Location ==
Cherupuzha is located at the junction of State Highway 59 and the Payyanur - Rajagiri Major District Road of about 31 km (19 mi) northeast of Payyanur, 36 km (22 mi) north of Taliparamba, 58 km (36 mi) north of the district headquarters Kannur, 45 km (28 mi) southeast of Kanhangad and 70 km (43 mi) southeast of the neighboring district headquarters Kasaragod.

== Tourism ==
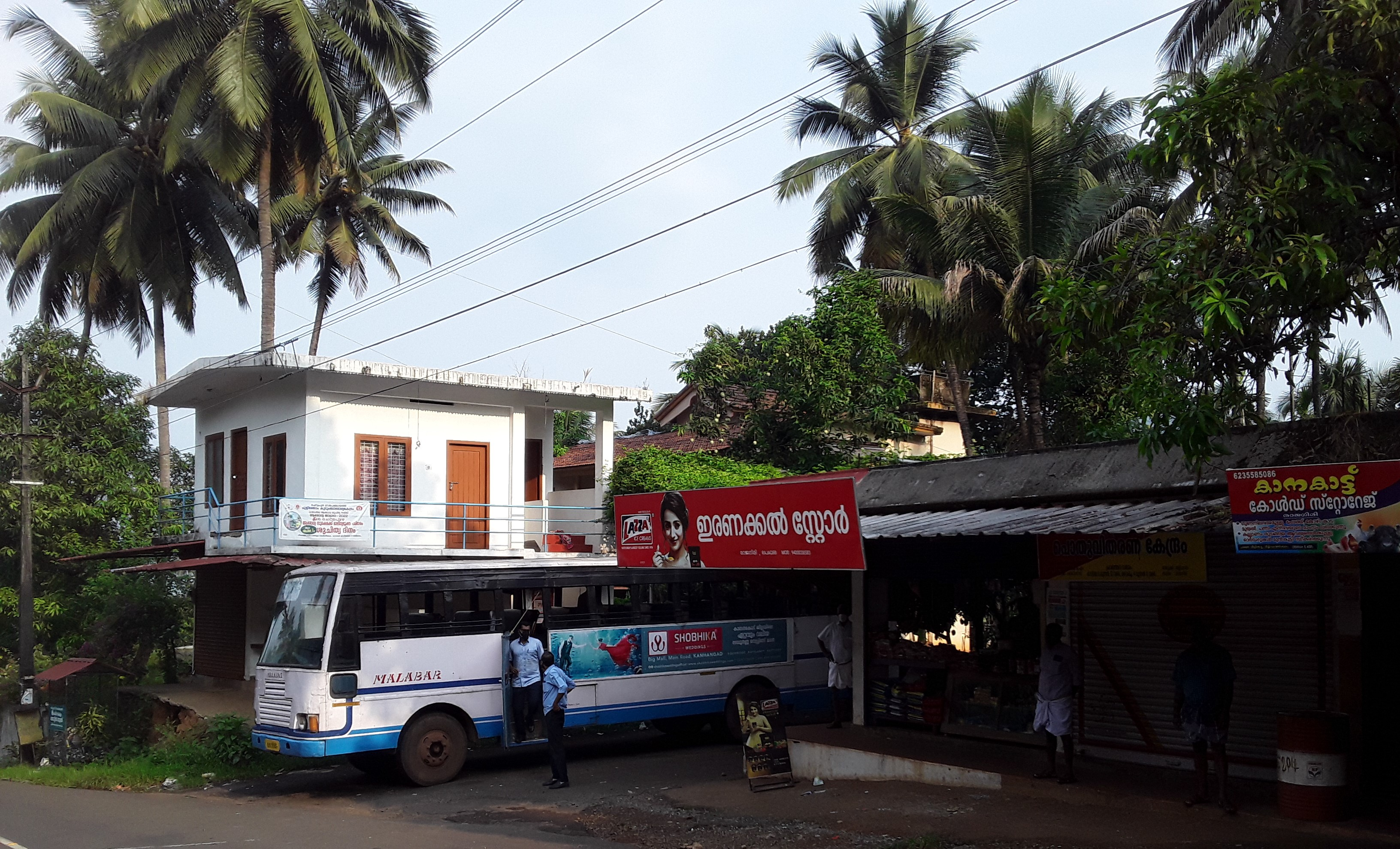
Rajagiri Hills

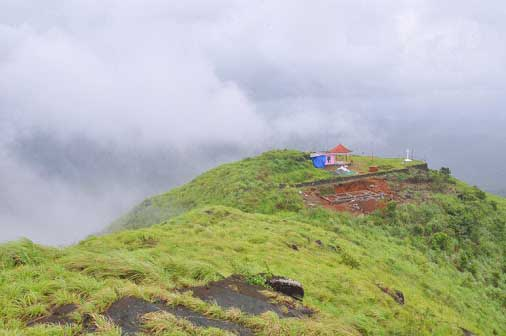
Kottathalachi Mount Near Cherupuzha

Adventure tourism activities are conducted on the Kariangode River, also known as the Tejaswini River. White-water rafting is conducted on stretches of the Kariangode River, near Cherupuzha and surrounding areas. A 12.5 km section is used for rafting during the monsoon and post-monsoon periods. Rafts typically carry 6 to 7 participants and are operated by trained guides. The activity is managed by licensed operators under safety protocols set by local authorities. White Water Rafting at Tejaswini river is one of the 17 best places for rafting in India.

== Demographics ==
As of 2011 census, Cherupuzha Grama Panchayat had a population of 30,733 where 15,004 are males and 15,729 are females. There were 7,052 families residing in the panchayat limits. The sex ratio of Cherupuzha was 1,048 lower than state average of 1,084. In Cherupuzha, 9.7% of the population was under 6 years of age. The average literacy rate of Cherupuzha was 95% higher than state average of 94% where male literacy stands at 96.3% and female literacy at 93.7%.

== Administration ==
Cherupuzha Grama Panchayat is divided into 20 wards. As of the 2025 Kerala local elections, the ruling party is UDF, who won 13 out of the 20 wards. Cherupuzha panchayat is part of Payyanur Block Panchayat and politically a part of Payyanur Assembly constituency under Kasaragod Lok Sabha constituency.

=== Ward list ===
Cherupuzha Grama Panchayat comprises of the following 20 wards.

Ward no.	Name	Ward no.	Name
1	Kollada	2	Cherupuzha
3	Koluvally	4	Chunda
5	Pulingome	6	Edavaramba
7	Kariyikkara	8	Rajagiri
9	Josegiri	10	Kozhichal
11	Chattivayal	12	Maruthumpadi
13	Thirumeni	14	Eyyankallu
15	Prapoyil	16	Parothumneer
17	Mulapra	18	Manjakkad
19	Kakkenchal	20	Machiyil

== Law and Order ==
The Panchayat comes under the jurisdiction of Cherupuzha police station, which was set up on 20 February 2016 by splitting Peringome police station. This police station is part of Payyanur subdivision under Kannur rural police district.

== Transport ==
=== Air ===
The nearest international airport is Kannur International Airport, located near Mattanur, 63 km from here. Mangalore and Calicut Airports are also relatively close.

=== Rail ===
The nearest railway station is 28.5 km (17.7 mi) away at Cheruvathur and 32 km (20 mi) from Nileshwar and 34 km (21 mi) away from Payyanur on Shoranur-Mangalore Section.

=== Roads ===
Hill Highway passes through Cherupuzha town connects it with Iritty and other towns in eastern areas of Kannur and Kasaragod districts. Mysore and Bangalore can be accessed on the eastern side of Iritty.

== Education ==
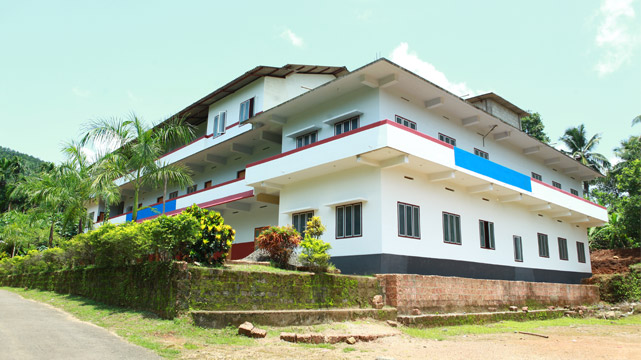
Navajyothi College, Cherupuzha

- Navajyothi College, Cherupuzha
- St. Joseph's HS, Cherupuzha
- St. Mary's HS, Cherupuzha
- Archangel's school, Cherupuzha
- Janaki Memorial UP school, Cherupuzha
- GHSS, Thirumeni
- GVHSS, Pulingome
- GHSS, Kozhichal
- GHSS, Prapoyil

== Places of worship ==
Cherupuzha is home to several places of worship representing Hindu, Christian and Muslim traditions.

=== St. Mary's Forane Church, Cherupuzha ===
St. Mary's Forane Church, Cherupuzha is one of the oldest Christian institutions in the area and a noted Marian shrine in North Malabar. The parish dates to the mid-20th century and is part of the Archeparchy of Tellicherry.

=== Cherupuzha Shri Ayyappa Temple ===
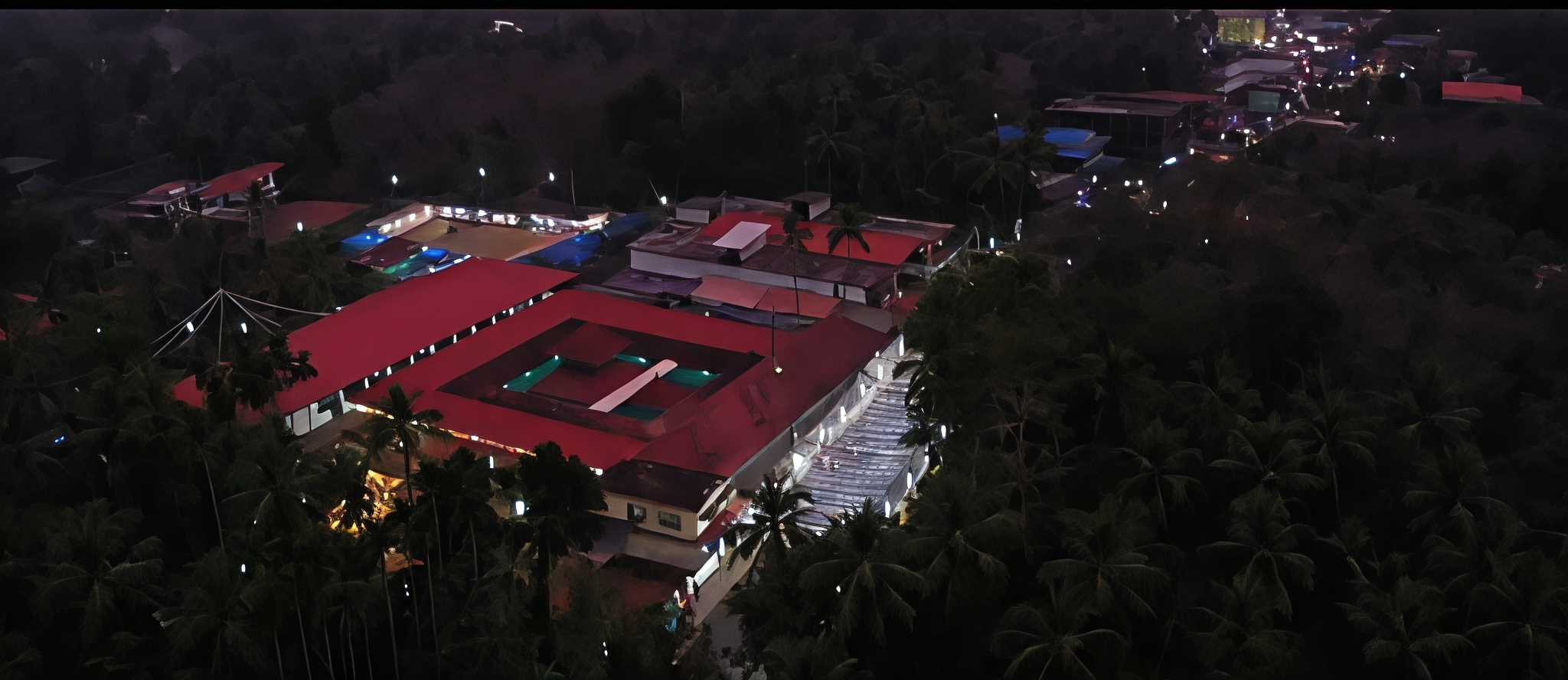
Aerial view of Cherupuzha Shri Ayyappa Temple

The Cherupuzha Shri Ayyappa Temple, located on Thirumeni Road, began as a bhajan (devotional) centre and developed into a temple complex in the late 20th century; it is widely regarded locally as a significant Ayyappa centre in North Malabar and holds an annual festival in December.

=== Chathamangalam St. Jude's Chapel ===
St. Jude's Church at Chathamangalam (near Thirumeni) serves pilgrims who come to the shrine; the church is dedicated to St Jude and attracts devotees from the surrounding area.

=== Jerusalem Mar Thoma Church ===
The Jerusalem Mar Thoma Church (Cherupuzha) is a Mar Thoma parish established in the area in the 1970s and functions as a local parish and community centre.

=== Mulapra Sree Dharmashastha Temple ===
Mulapra Sree Dharmashastha (Ayyappa/Dharmashastha) temple, about 5 km from Cherupuzha on the Thirumeni road, is a local Hindu shrine with an annual festival held in January.

=== Pulingome Makhaam ===
Pulingome Makhaam (also spelled Makham/Maqam) is a Muslim shrine near Cherupuzha with an annual Uroose festival; local newspapers report large attendance and community food (annadanam) during the festival.

=== Kripalayam Retreat Centre ===
Kripalayam is a Christian retreat centre and prayer facility near Cherupuzha that holds regular prayer gatherings and retreats.

=== Kottathalachi Mala ===
Kottathalachi (Kottathalachi Mala) is a hilltop Christian pilgrimage site east of Cherupuzha; a cross was installed there on Good Friday in 1958 and the site is known locally as the "Malayattoor of Malabar". The site draws large numbers of pilgrims, especially on the first Sunday after Easter.

=== St. Joseph’s Church, Pulingome ===
St. Joseph's Church, Pulingome, was established in the mid-20th century by migrants from Travancore and continues to serve the local Syrian Catholic community as a parish of the Archeparchy of Tellicherry.

=== Baptist Church, Kokkadavu ===
The Baptist Church at Kokkadavu serves the local Christian community as a place for worship and fellowship.

=== Narambil Bhagavathy and Theyyam traditions ===
Narambil Bhagavathy is a local form of the Bhadrakali deity venerated in the Cherupuzha area; associated theyyam performances and local temple folklore are part of the region's ritual calendar.

=== Other religious centres ===
Other temples and shrines in and around Cherupuzha include Edavaramba Vishnumurthy Temple, Kariyakkara Ara of Pottan Theyyam, Muchilottu Bhagavathy Temple (Vilakkuvettam), Chunda Thattummal Vishnumurthy Temple, Ayannur Shiva Temple, Kamballur Bhagavathy Temple, Pulingome Sankaranarayana Swami Temple and Meenkulam Sreekrishna Temple.

== Notable people ==
- Treesa Jolly, Indian badminton player
- Roji M. John, Indian politician
- Kaumudi Teacher, Indian freedom activist

== See also ==
- Pulingome, 6 km east of Cherupuzha
- Kozhichal, 11 km east of Cherupuzha
- Padiyotchal, 4.5 km southwest of Cherupuzha
- Peringome, 10 km southwest of Cherupuzha
- Thirumeni, 8 km southeast of Cherupuzha
- Chittarikkal, 6 km north of Cherupuzha
