= Udayagiri, Kerala =

Udayagiri
- village
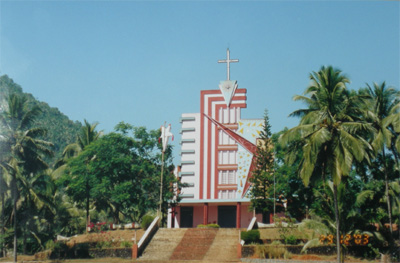
- St. Mary's Church, Udayagiri

- Location in Kerala, India Udayagiri (India)
- Coordinates: 12°14′0″N 75°28′0″E
- Country: India
- State: Kerala
- District: Kannur

Government
  - Type: Grama Panchayat

Area
  - Total: 51.84 km^{2} (20.02 sq mi)

Population
  - Total: 18,804
  - Density: 362.7/km^{2} (939.5/sq mi)

Languages
  - Official: Malayalam, English
- Time zone: UTC+5:30 (IST)
- Postal code: 670571
- ISO 3166 code: IN-KL
- Vehicle registration: KL-59

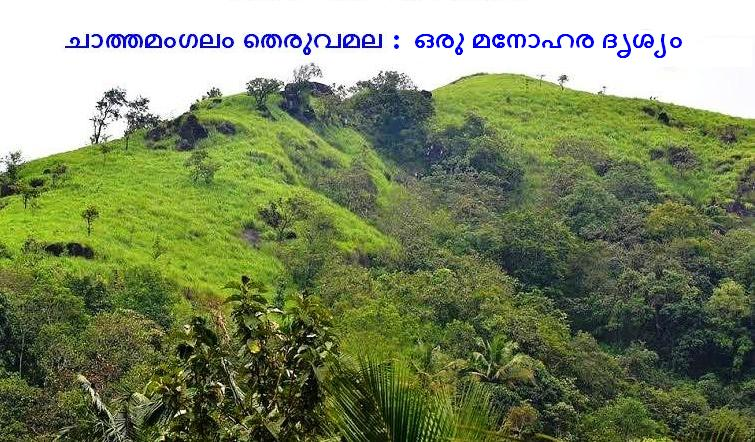
Chathamangalam Theruvamala

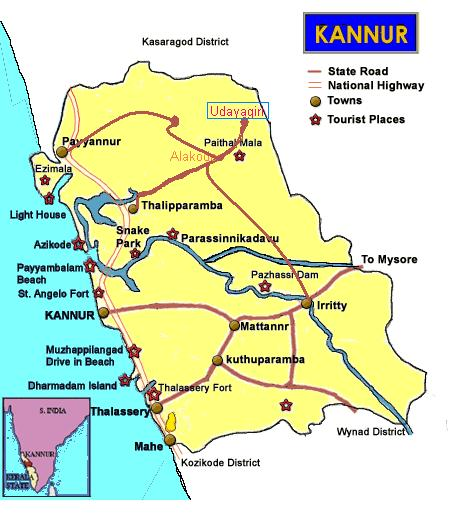
Map of Kannur District showing Udayagiri.

Udayagiri is a village in Taliparamba taluk of Kannur District in Kerala, India. It is about 55 km from Kannur city.

== Economy ==
Main sources of income for are agriculture and incoming remittances. The villagers of this hamlet migrated from the southern parts of Kerala in the early 1940s, most of them from Kottayam and Ernakulam district.

== History ==
Udayagiri is located in the Sahyadri mountain range that used to be home for ancient cultures. Tribes such as Malayans and Maayilyans lived in harmony with the nature for hundreds of years here. Settlers arrived in the 50's looking for cheaper land and better life.

During the early days (1950s), the settlers lived in tree houses to escape from the large number of elephants present in the area. The needs of the population were very basic. They cleared forests and planted rice, yucca and bananas. The essential services like local hospitals or schools did not exist. Transportation was very limited. Educational institutions were tens of miles away. The daily staples beyond what they produced, had to come from Thaliparamba, which was about 35 km away by foot. Many early families in the area had to fight years-long, painful legal battles to get their land rights.

== Geography ==
Udayagiri is a scenic village of Kannur district located on the Southern Sahyadri mountains. The terrain is undulating in nature and the extreme eastern side has forests bordering Karnataka state.

== Major agricultural crops grown are ==
- Rubber Tree
- Coconut Palm
- Arecanut Palm
- Black pepper
- Vanilla
- Cashewnut
- Cocoa

== Chathamangalam Hill Station ==
Chathamangalam (Kannur) is a hill station in Udayagiri panchayath. Starting in Udayagiri panchayath Chathamangalam hill station extends to neighbouring Cherupuzha and Alakode panchayaths.

== Pythalmala ==
Pythalmala is a hill station, situated 4,500 ft. above sea level near the Kerala-Karnataka border, and is rich in flora and fauna. It is a 6 km trek to the top of the hills.

== Transportation ==
The National Highway 66 passes through Taliparamba town. Goa and Mumbai can be accessed on the northern side and Cochin and Thiruvananthapuram can be accessed on the southern side. Taliparamba has a good bus station and buses are easily available to all parts of Kannur district. The road to the east of Iritty connects to Mysore and Bangalore. The nearest railway stations are Kannapuram and Kannur on the Mangalore-Palakkad line. Trains are available to almost all parts of India subject to advance booking over the internet. The nearest airport is Kannur International Airport which is about 60 kilometres from Udayagiri.
