= Pulingome =

Village in Kerala, India

- Village
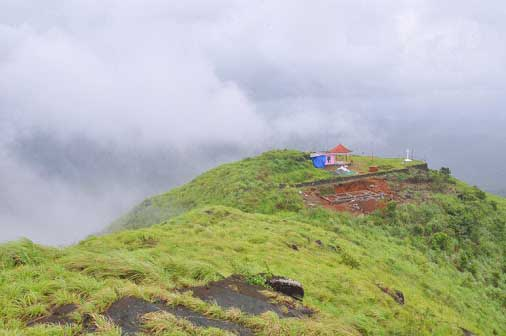
- Kottathalachi Mount near Pulingome

- Location in Kerala, India Pulingome (India)
- Coordinates: 12°17′0″N 75°25′0″E
- Country: India
- State: Kerala
- District: Kannur

Area
  - Total: 28.8 km^{2} (11.1 sq mi)

Population (2011)
  - Total: 10,672
  - Density: 371/km^{2} (960/sq mi)

Languages
  - Official: Malayalam, English
- Time zone: UTC+5:30 (IST)
- PIN: 670511
- Telephone code: 04985
- ISO 3166 code: IN-KL
- Vehicle registration: KL-86
- Nearest city: Payyannur
- Lok Sabha constituency: Kasaragod
- Website: http://www.pulingome.com

Pulingome is a village in Kannur District of Kerala state, India.

== Location ==
Pulingome is a village located in Cherupuzha Grama Panchayat, in the Kannur district in northern Kerala. Located between the Western Ghats and the Karnataka forest, It is 76 km away from Kannur and 37 km from Payyanur.

== Demographics ==
As of 2011 Census, Pulingome village which spreads over an area of 28.8 km^{2} (11.1 sq mi) had total population of 10,672 which 5,237 males and 5,435 females. Total number of households were 2,631 in the village limits. Population of children in the age group 0-6 was 1,014 (9.5%) where 518 are males and 496 are females. Pulingome village had overall literacy of 94% where male literacy was 95.4% and female literacy was 92.8%.

== History ==
Pulingome was under the rule of Mushika dynasty of Ezhimala during the Sangha Age. Later, this became part of "Kolathunadu" under Chirakkal dynasty. Pulingome had a well established society and a rich culture all through its history. The ancient Sree Sankaranarayan temple here is believed to be set up by "Parasuram". The Pulingome Makham were two holy men of Islam, were buried some 1300 years ago and the remaining of a temple in the Karnataka forest near the border are examples of Pulingome’s cultural heritage. Later with the invasion of Tippu these regions were brought under Mysore kingdom and after Tippu’s death the region was under British rule. The Kamballur Kottayil Nambiar clan were the landlords of the Pulingome village and surrounding areas up until land reform in Kerala in the 1960s.

== Transportation ==
The national highway passes through Perumba junction. Goa and Mumbai can be accessed on the northern side and Cochin and Thiruvananthapuram can be accessed on the southern side. The road to the east of Iritty connects to Mysore and Bangalore. The nearest railway station is Payyanur on Mangalore-Palakkad line. Trains are available to almost all parts of India subject to advance booking over the internet. There are airports at Kannur, Mangalore and Calicut. All of them are international airports but direct flights are available only to Middle Eastern countries.
