= Architecture of Kerala =

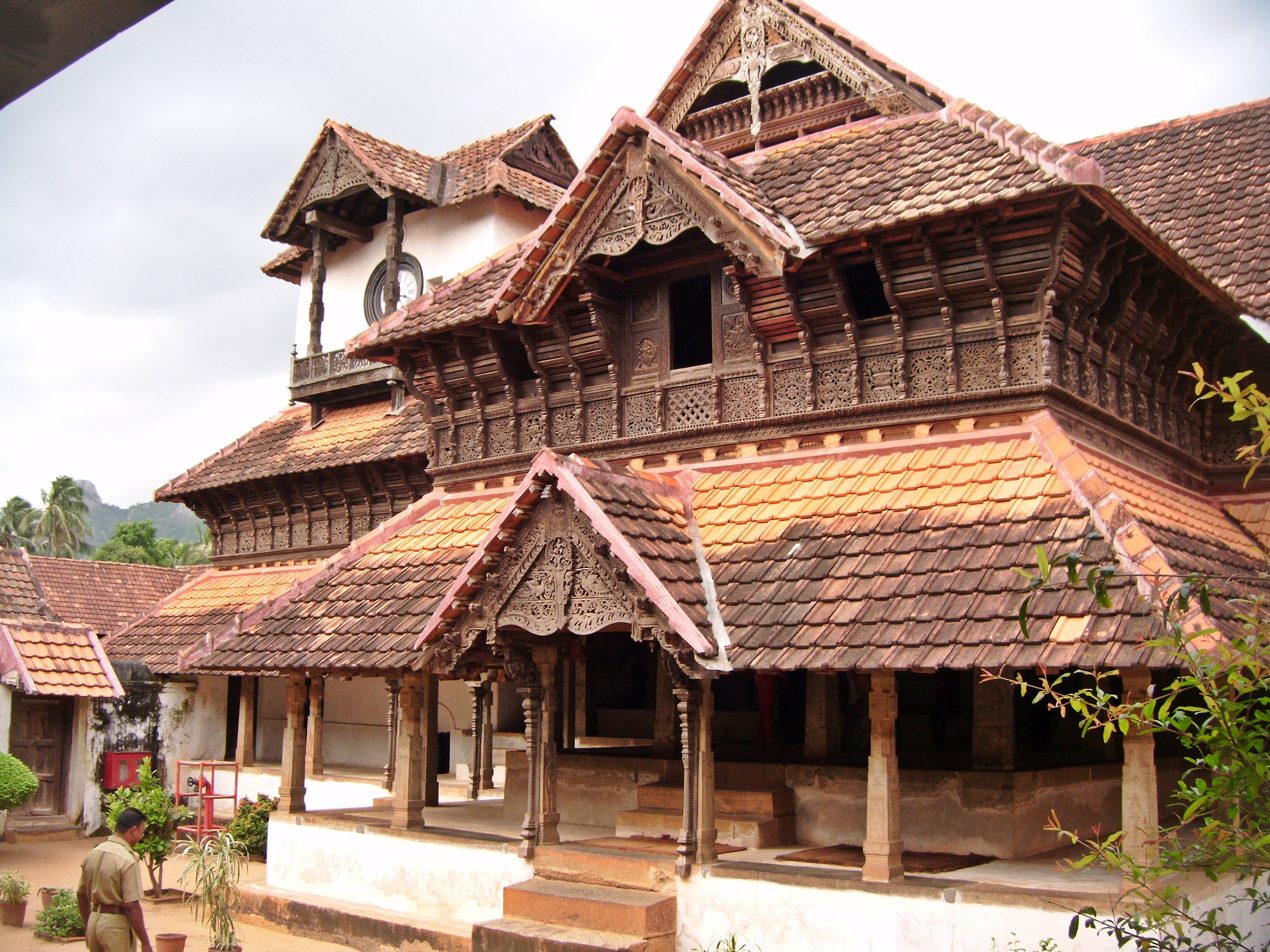
Traditional features of Kerala architecture with prominent roofs and woodwork

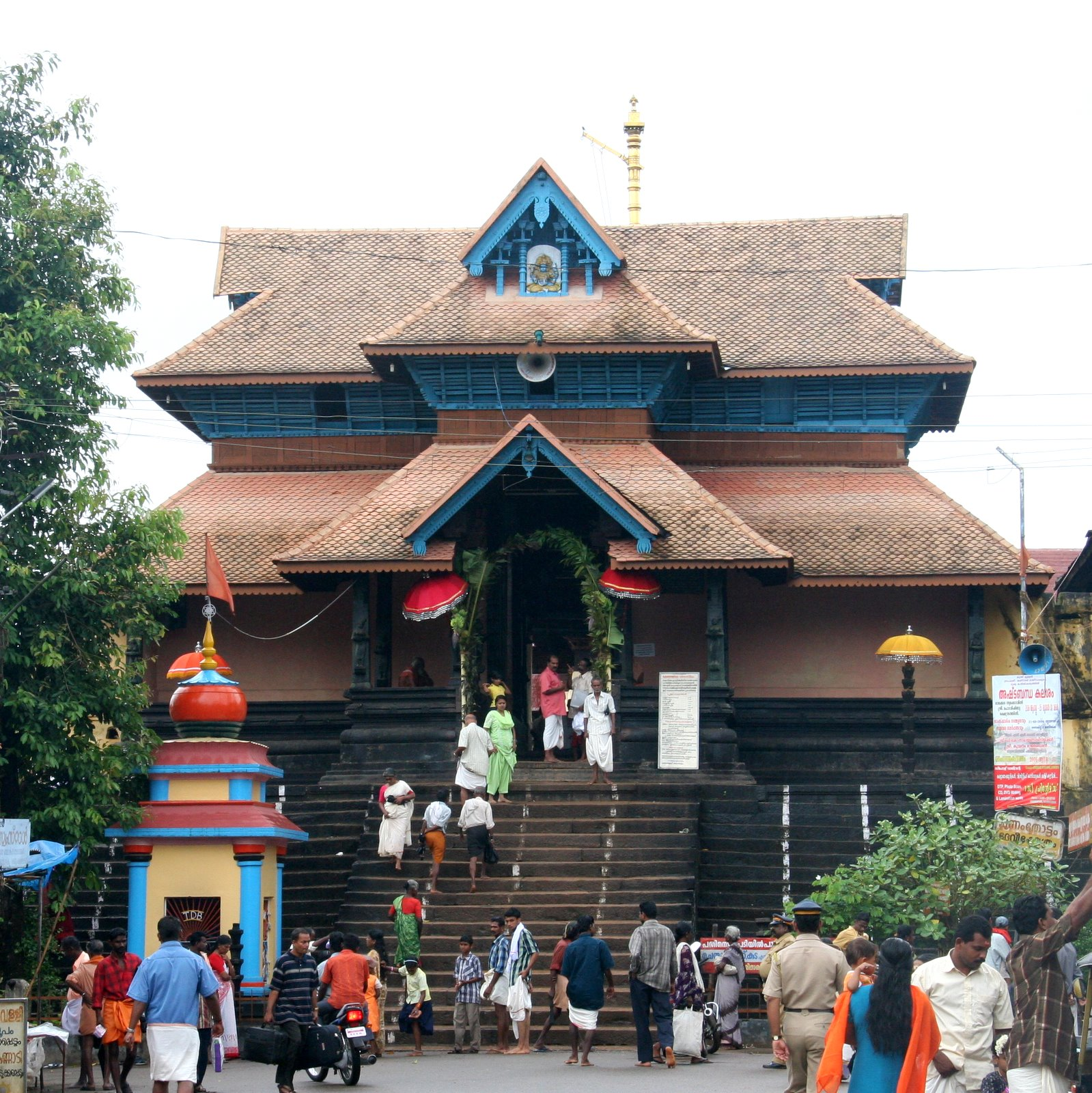
Temple entrance gateway (gopuram) in Aranmula, Kerala

Kerala architecture is a style of architecture found in the Indian state of Kerala, and in Tulu Nadu and the Kodagu regions of Karnataka. Kerala's architectural style includes a unique religious sanctuary architecture that emerged in southwestern India, and varies slightly from the Dravidian architecture observed in other parts of southern India. The architecture of Kerala is derived from the Indian Vedic architectural tradition and forms a part of Dravidian architecture, one of the three styles of temple design mentioned in the ancient books on Vastu shastra. The Tantrasamuchaya, Thachu Sastra, Manushyalaya Chandrika, and Silparatna are all architectural treatises that have had an impact on the architecture of Kerala. The Manushyalaya Chandrika, a work devoted to domestic architecture, has its roots in Kerala. In the Malabar Coast, coastal trade resulted in Islamic and Christian architecture harmoniously blending in with indigenous Kerala architecture styles.

== Origins ==
The characteristic regional expression of Kerala architecture is a result of multiple geographical, climatic, and historical factors. Geographically, Kerala is a narrow strip of coastal land confined between the towering Western Ghats to its east and the vast Arabian Sea to its west. Due to monsoon rains and a high average temperature, the region has an abundance of wildlife and vegetation. Human habitation is densely concentrated in the fertile lowlands and more sparsely towards the hostile highlands. Heavy rains have created large bodies of water in the form of lakes, rivers, backwaters, and lagoons. These climatic factors significantly influence the region's architectural style: buildings are designed to counter the wet conditions, heavy humidity, and harsh tropical summers.

=== Early texts ===
The Thachu Sastra (science of carpentry), along with texts like Vastu shastra, Manasara and Mayamata, expounded the design and concepts of early traditional Kerala architecture. Since the medieval period, traditional Kerala architecture has created its own branch of architectural manuals: notably, the Tantra Samucchayam, Manushyalaya-Chandrika, and Silparatna. These Vastu and carpentry (thachu) texts have influenced the architecture of Kerala.

=== Joinery techniques ===
Traditional Kerala architecture is built with wooden joinery techniques, without the use of nails. Taccans (carpenters) use many traditional types of joinery techniques, some of them are; Padavilani, Ardhapani sandhi, Mondhayam, Koodam, Arakuduma, Makara Kuduma, Sthamba, Netti Kudumu, Kakkavaya, Nandyavartha, Sarvathabadhra, among others. Kīla (wedge) made of wood is used to tighten the joints in some joinery, this joint is air and watertight. This method also helps in easy dismantling of the structure by removing the kīla, and the structure can be reassembled again as needed.

== History ==
=== Prehistoric era ===
Kerala's location has influenced social development and, indirectly, the style of construction. In ancient times the Arabian Sea and the Ghats formed impenetrable barriers that influenced the evolution of an isolated culture of Proto-Dravidians. Rock engravings in the Edakkal Caves, in Wayanad date back to the Neolithic era around 6000 BCE. The earliest surviving vestiges of construction in Kerala are rock-cut megaliths around 1000 BCE. They can be grouped into two types: rock-cut tomb cells and megaliths.

The rock-cut tomb cells are generally located in the laterite zones of central Kerala, for example at Porkulam, in Thrissur district. The tombs are roughly oblong in shape with single or multiple-bed chambers, with a rectangular court in the east from which steps rise to ground level. Another type of burial chamber is made of four slabs placed on their edges and a fifth one covering them as a capstone. One or more such dolmens are marked by a stone circle. Among the megaliths are the umbrella stones (kudakkal), resembling handless palm leaf umbrellas used for covering pits enclosing burial urns. Two other types of megaliths, hat-stones (thoppikkal) and menhirs (pulachikkal), have no burial appendages and appear instead to be memorial stones.

These megaliths are not of particular architectural significance, but they speak to the custom of primitive tribes erecting memorials at sites of mortuary rites. These places later became the annual meeting grounds of the tribes and gave rise to occult temples of ancestral worship. While the custom of father worship can be seen in these cases, the protecting deities of the villages were always in female form and were worshiped in open groves (kavu). These hypaethral temples had trees, stone symbols of mother goddesses, and other naturalistic or animistic images as objects of worship. The continuity of this early culture is seen in the folk arts, cult rituals, worship of trees, serpents, and mother images in kavus.

=== Dravidian architecture ===
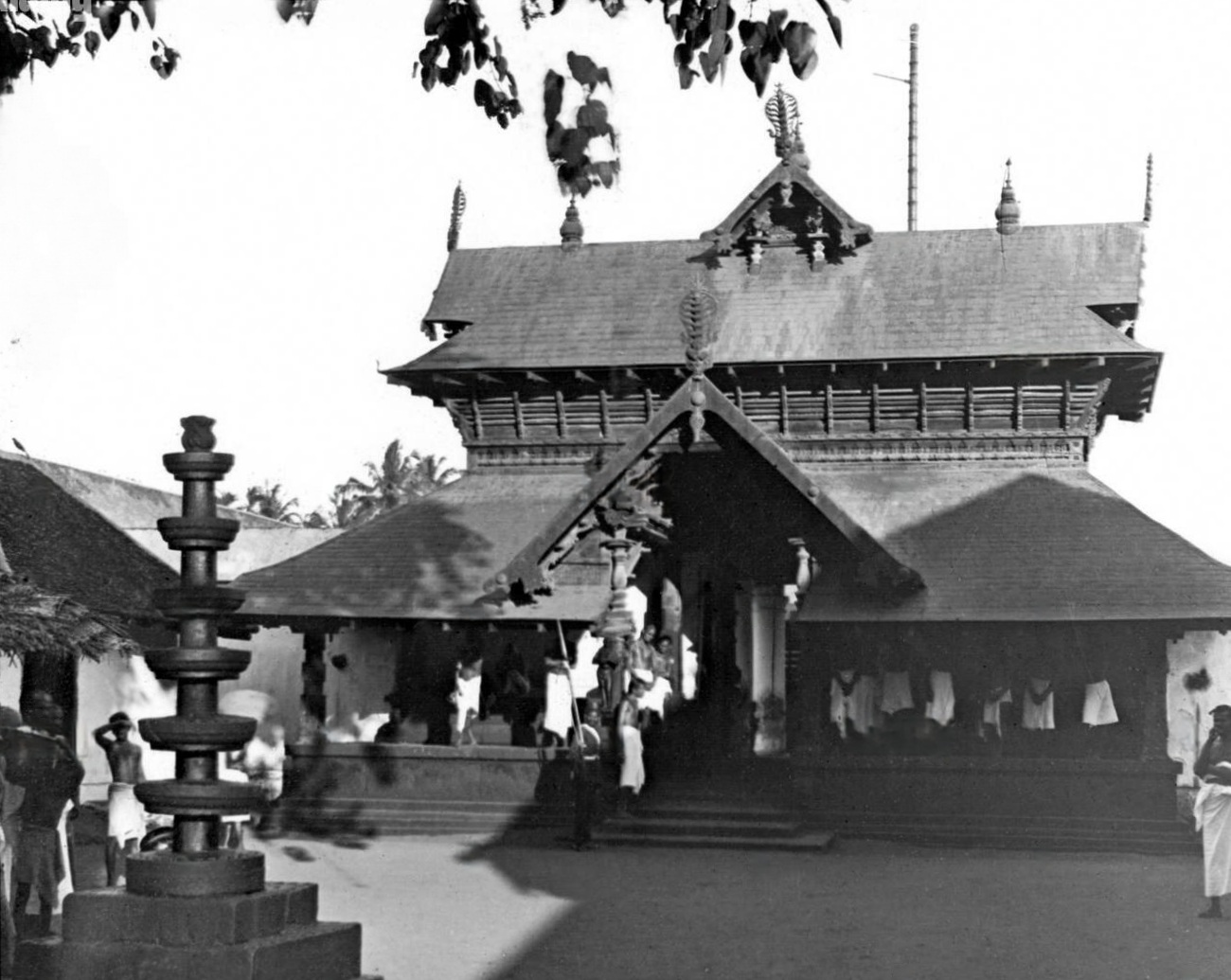
Mukhappu (gable) of Guruvayur temple, Kalasham (finial) and Kalvilakku (stone lantern) in the front. Guruvayur is a major historic Krishna temple in Kerala, built in the classical style. ca. 1900

The version of Dravidian architecture found in Kerala in the far southwest is significantly different. Very large temples are rare, and sloping roofs with projecting eaves dominate the outline, often arranged in a number of tiers. As in Bengal, this is an adaption to the heavy monsoon rainfall. There is usually a granite stone core called adhiṣṭhāna below a timber superstructure.

Jain monuments are more numerous in Kerala. They include rock shelters at Chitral Jain cave near Nagercoil, a rock-cut temple at Kallil near Perumbavoor, and remains of structural temples at Alathoor near Palakkad and at Sultanbathery. Jainimedu Jain temple is a 15th-century Jain temple located at Jainimedu, 3 km from the centre of Palakkad. Sculptured Kerala Jaina and Dravidian figures of Mahavira, Parswanatha, and other thirthankaras have been recovered from these sites. This remained a Jain temple until 1522 AD, when it was consecrated as a Hindu temple. Sultan Bathery also has the remains of a Jaina basti (Jain temple), known as Ganapati vattam, which is an example of a cloistered temple built entirely of granite.

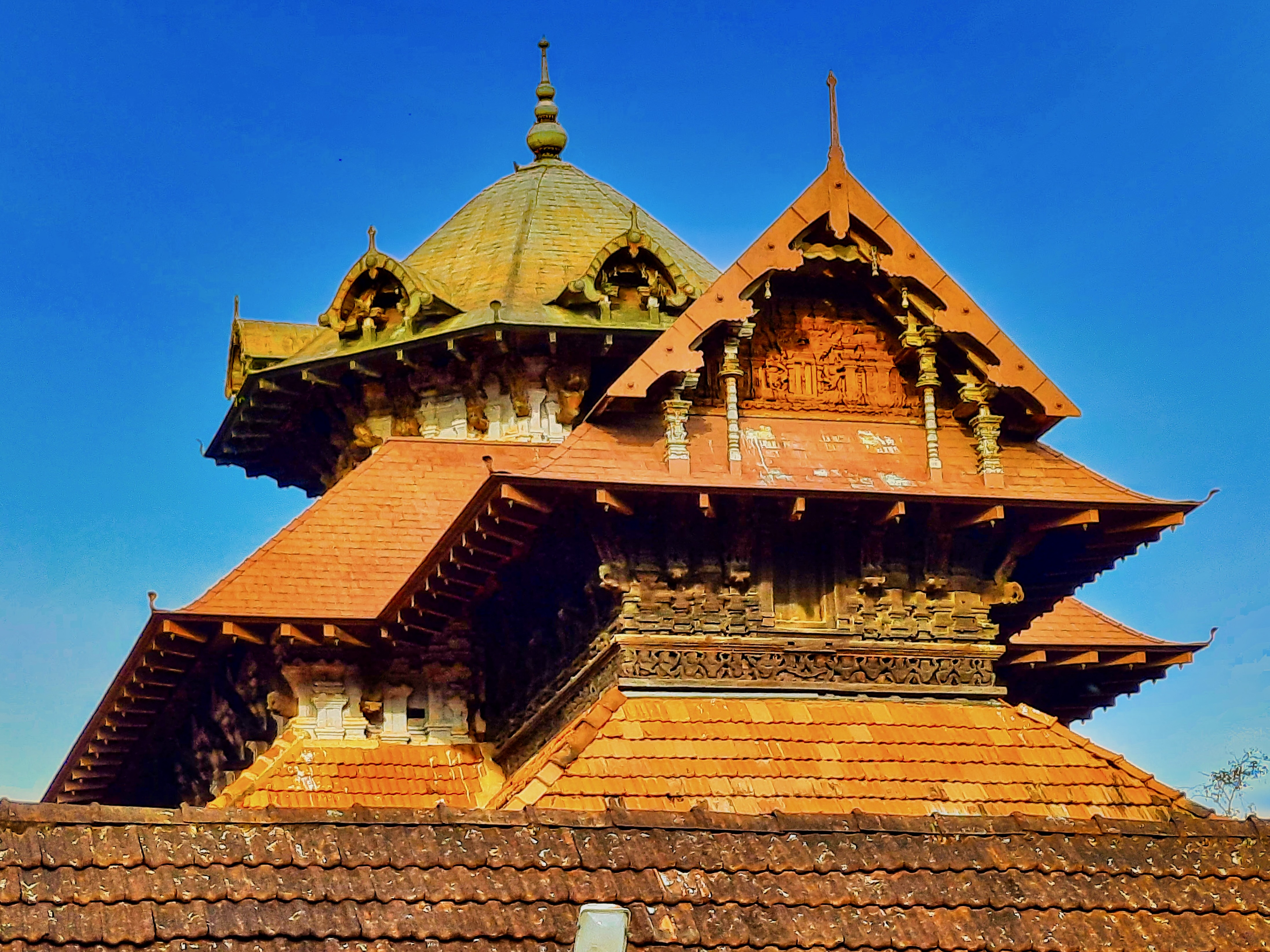
Central shrine of the Peruvanam Mahadeva temple

A Thorana is a gateway within a palisade, visible in the vertical and horizontal structures of the vilakkumadam. In its most primitive form, this construction is seen in the hypaethral temples enshrining trees and later on the outer walls of the shrines proper. With the stylistic development of the Hindu temple, this form of palisade is removed from the shrine structure (srikovil) and taken as a separate edifice beyond the temple cloister (chuttambalam).

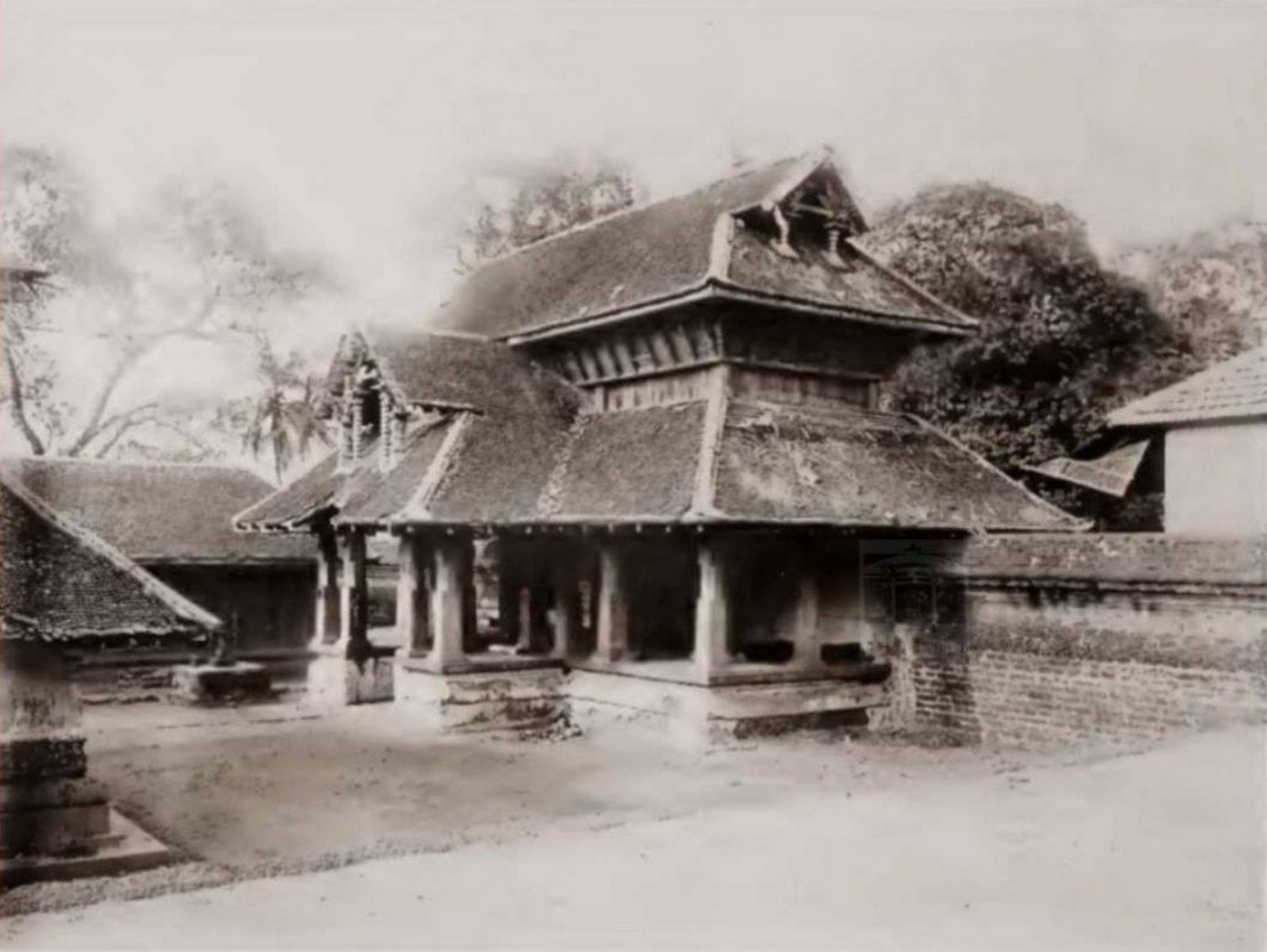
Gopuram gateway of Thali Mahakshetram temple built in typical Kerala style, ca. 1890

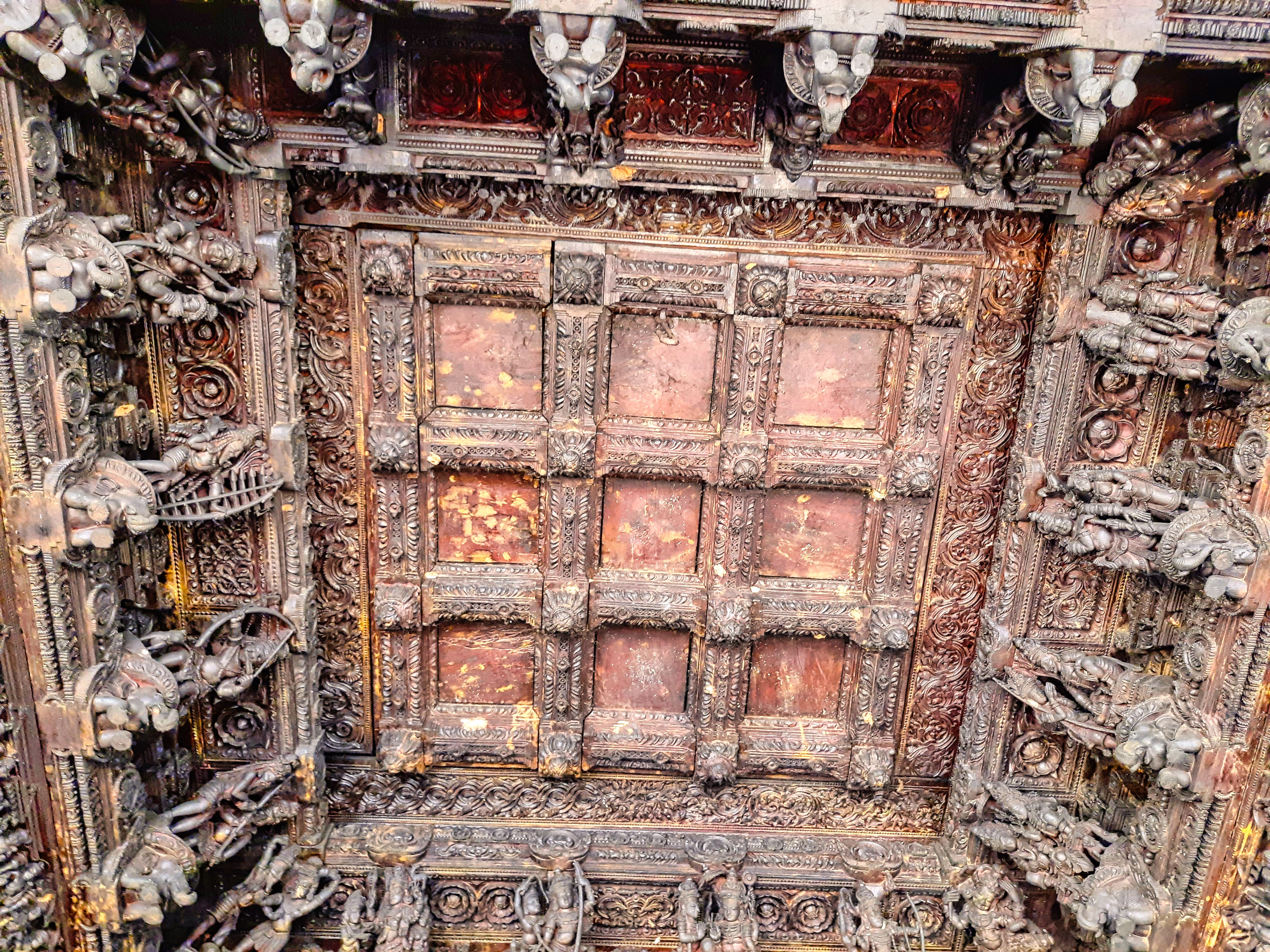
Ornate wooden ceilings commonly seen inside Kerala style namaskara-mandapam (pavilion) of temples.

Early Tamil Sangam literature says that by the first century AD, the Cheras ruled all of present-day Kerala, parts of Tulu Nadu and Kodagu, and the Kongu lands (present Salem and Coimbatore regions). The territory had multiple capitals simultaneously administered by different lineages of the family, its main capital being Vanchi, which is associated with Thiruvanchikulam Temple near Kodungallur. At this time, the two extremities of the Kerala region were administered by two Velir families; the southernmost part was administered by the Ay chieftains of Thiruvananthapuram and the northernmost parts by the Nannans of Ezhilmalai. The Nannan line was a branch of the Ay originating in the Thiruvananthapuram area, and both were representatives (or vassals) under the suzerainty of the Cheras (and sometimes the Pandyas or Cholas or Pallavas).

The amalgamation of different cultures and religious philosophies evolved the architectural styles of Kerala temples. This was conducive to the architectural development and renovation of a large number of temples. After the decline of the Cheras, several small principalities developed all over Kerala. By the fifteenth century, Kerala was broadly covered by the suzerainty of four principal chieftains – Venad rulers in the south, Kochi Maharajas in the centre, Zamorins of Kozhikode in the north, and Kolathiri Rajas in the extreme north. They were rulers who patronised architectural activities. It was during this period that Kerala architecture started to form its own distinctive style. A regional character of construction developed, which incorporated Dravidian craft skills, unique forms of Buddhist buildings, design concepts of Vedic times, and canonical theories of Hindu Agamic practices, all using locally available materials and suited to the climatic conditions of Kerala.

Texts on the theory and practice of architectural construction were also compiled during this period. These compilations constitute classical texts of a living tradition that continues to this day. Four important books are: Thantrasamuchayam by Chennas Narayanan Namboodiri and Silpiratnam by Sreekumara, which cover temple architecture; and Vastuvidya (anonymous) and Manushyalaya Chandrika by Thirumangalathu Sri Neelakandan, which cover domestic architecture. A number of minor works based on the above texts, in Sanskrit, Manipravalam, and refined Malayalam, are popular in Kerala with craftsmen and professionals in the field.

Kerala is referred to as one of the vassal kingdoms of the Maurya Empire. It is possible that Buddhists and Jains were the first north Indian groups to cross the borders of Kerala and establish their monasteries. These religious groups were able to practise their faith and receive patronage from the local kings to build shrines and viharas. For nearly eight centuries, Buddhism and Jainism seem to have co-existed in Kerala as important spiritual traditions, contributing to the social and architectural development of the region.

== Composition and structure ==
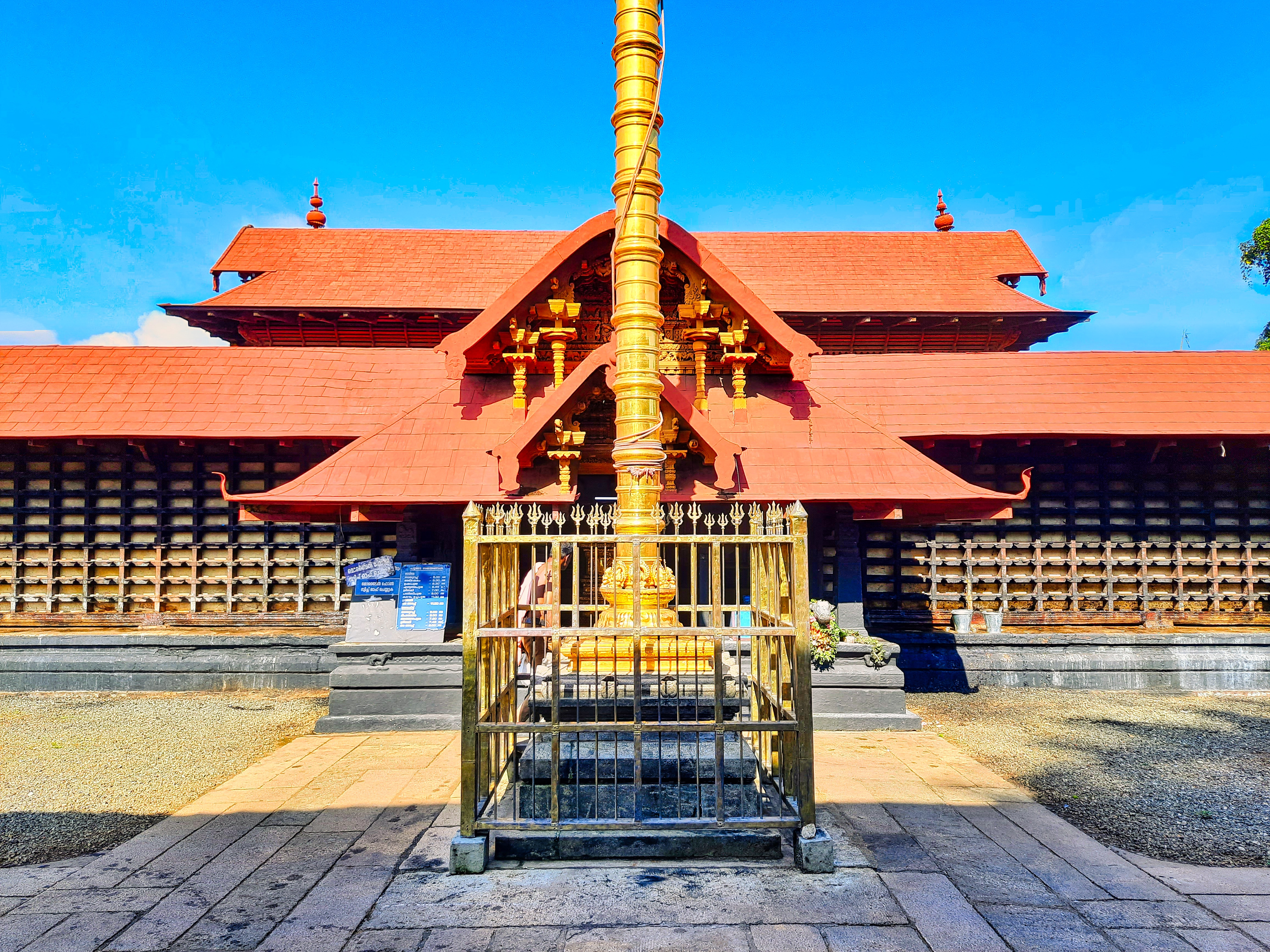
Kaviyur Mahadeva temple with mukhappu gable, sloping roofs and dwajastambam pillar in the front.

Kerala architecture can be broadly divided by functionality into two distinctive groups: religious architecture and domestic architecture. Each is guided by different design principles. Religious architecture primarily concerns Hindu temples, as well as some churches and mosques. Domestic architecture concerns most residential houses, and comes in several distinct styles; palaces and large mansions of feudal lords differ from houses of commoners, and marked differences also exist between religious communities.

=== Composition ===
The primary elements are generally the same in all structures. The base model usually consists of a plain circular, square, or rectangular shape with a ribbed roof, for functional reasons. A distinctive visual form in Kerala architecture is the long, steep sloping roof built to protect the building's walls and withstand heavy monsoons. This roof is normally laid with tiles or a thatched labyrinth of palm leaves, supported on a frame made of hardwood and timber. Structurally the roof frames are supported on pillars atop walls erected on plinths raised above the ground for protection against dampness and insects in the tropical climate. Often the walls are also constructed using timbers that are abundantly available in Kerala. These structures came to include mukhappu gable windows at the two ends, which provide attic ventilation when the roof is incorporated into habitable rooms.

The belief system of Vastu plays an important role in developing architectural styles. The basic underlying belief is that every structure built on Earth has its own life, with a soul and personality that is shaped by its surroundings. Kerala indigenously developed Thachu Shastra ('the science of carpentry'), as timber was readily available and heavily used. The concept of Thachu underlines that since timber is derived from a living form, the wood, when used for construction, has its own life which must be synthesised in harmony with its surroundings and the people who dwell within it. This idea encapsulates Kochi's construction.

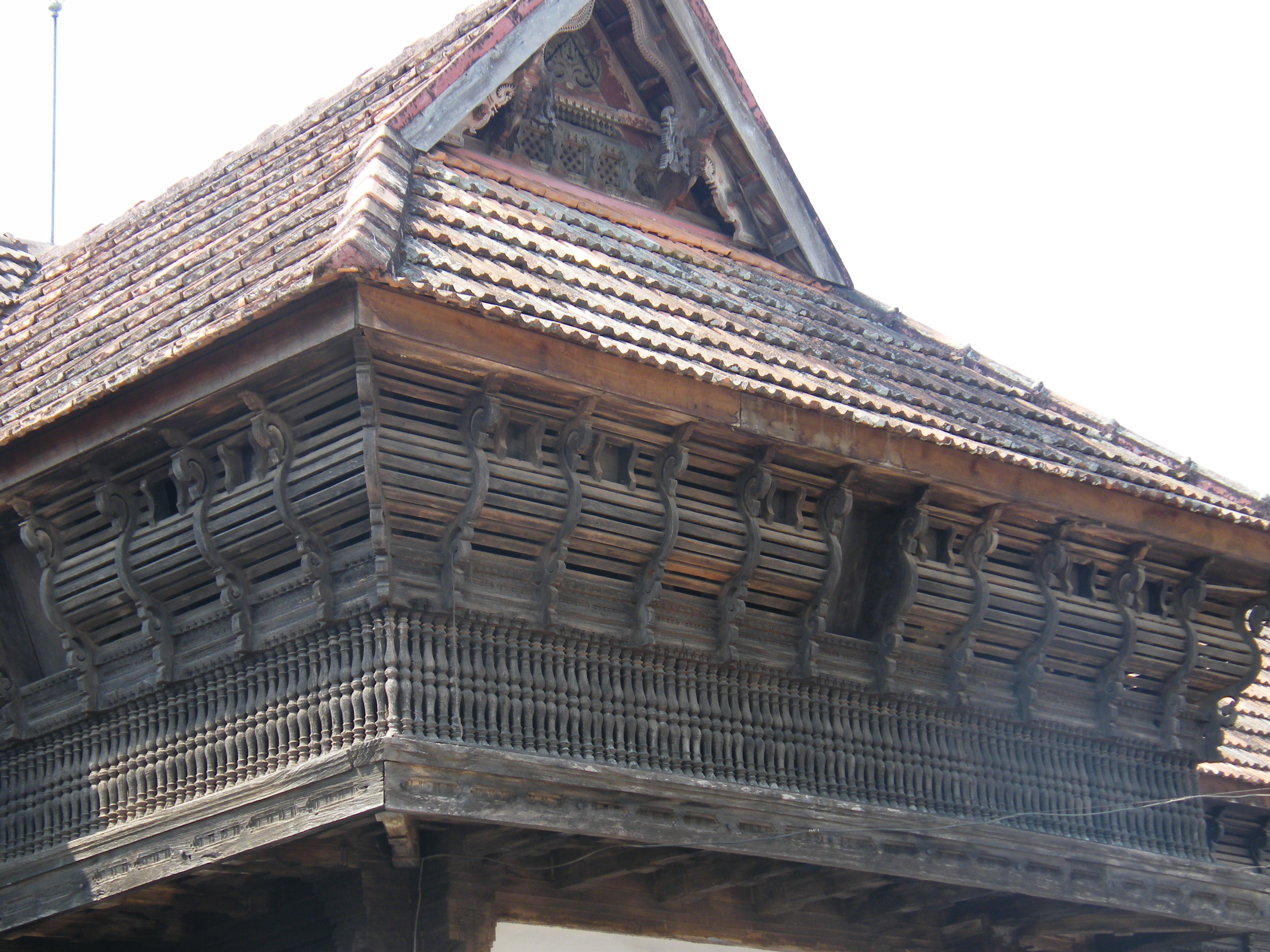
Traditional ornate gable (mukhappu) and window benches (charupadi)

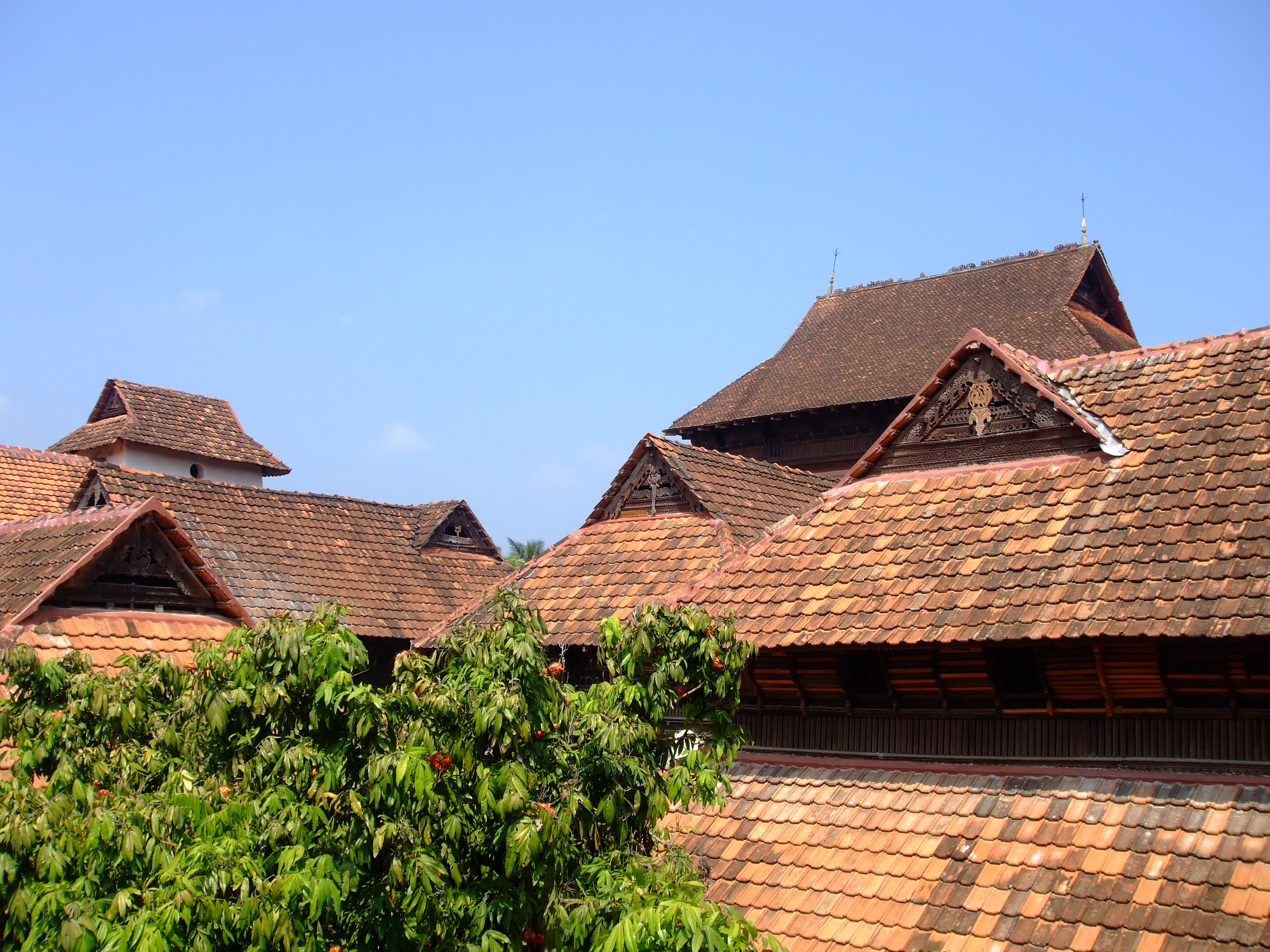
The gabled roof and ceiling are a prime feature of the Kerala architectural style.

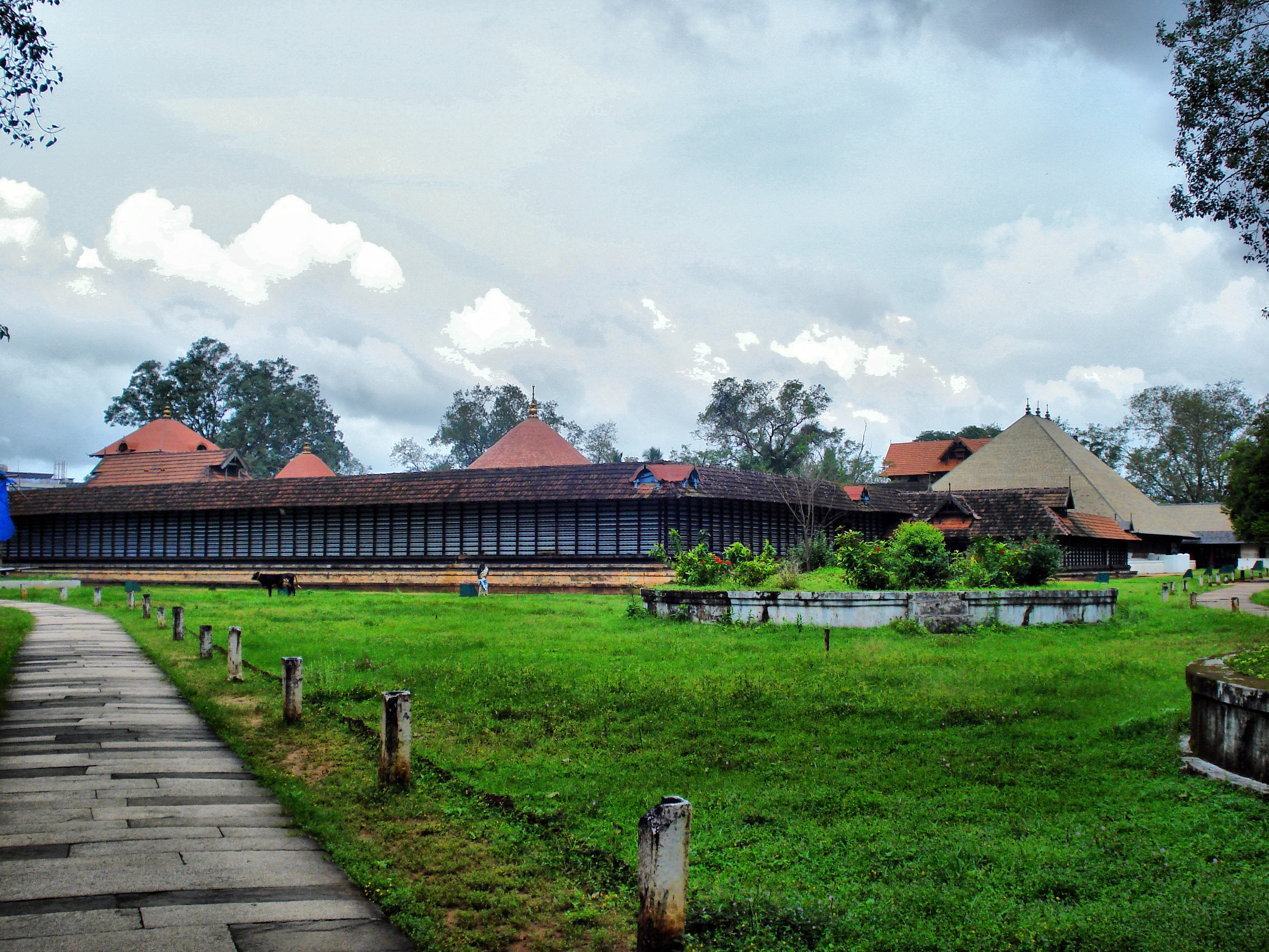
Vadakumnatha Temple, Trissur, is a fine example of Kerala Style Dravidian architecture.

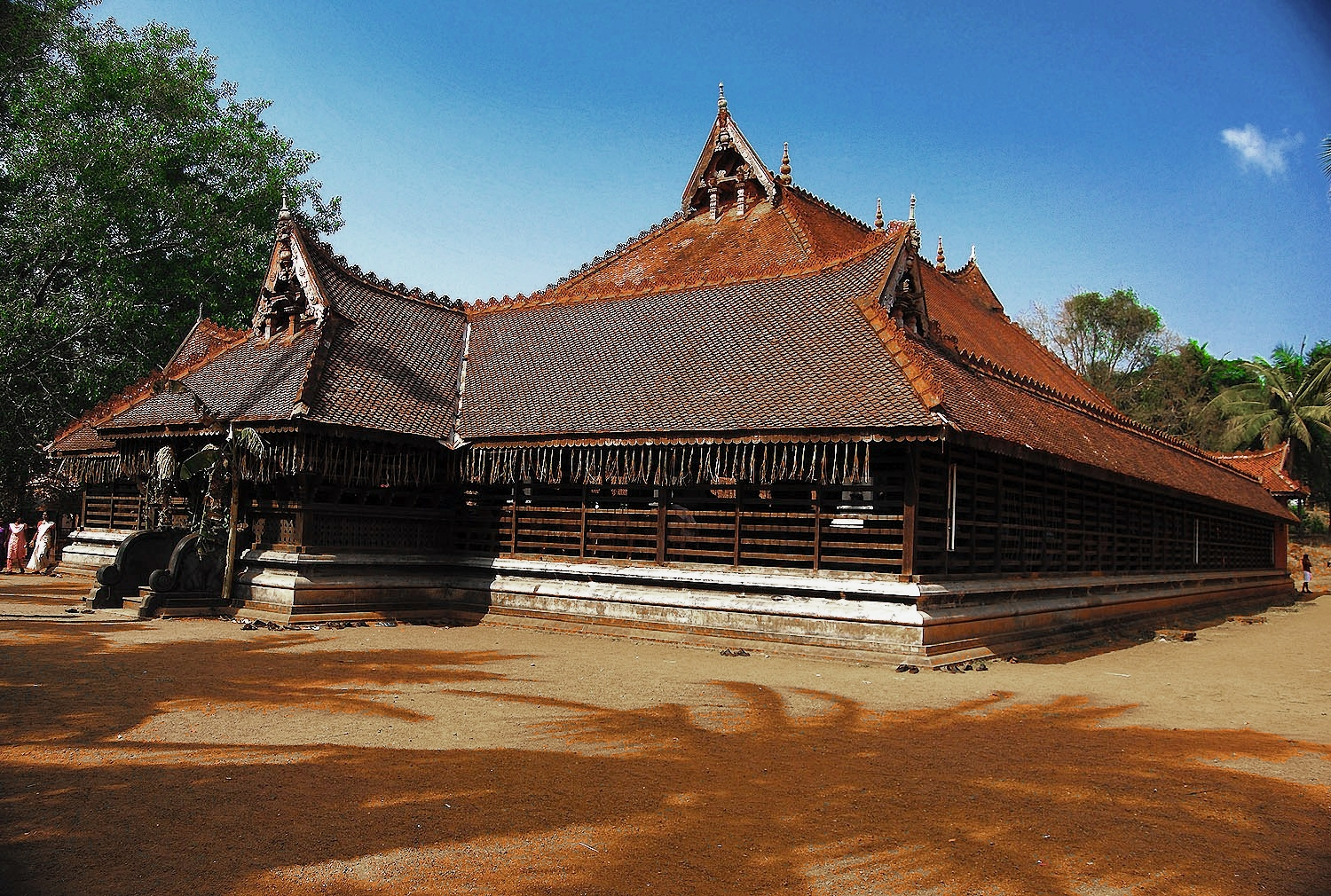
Most Kerala buildings visually appear to have low height, due to over-sloping of roofs, which protect walls from rain and direct sunshine.

=== Materials ===
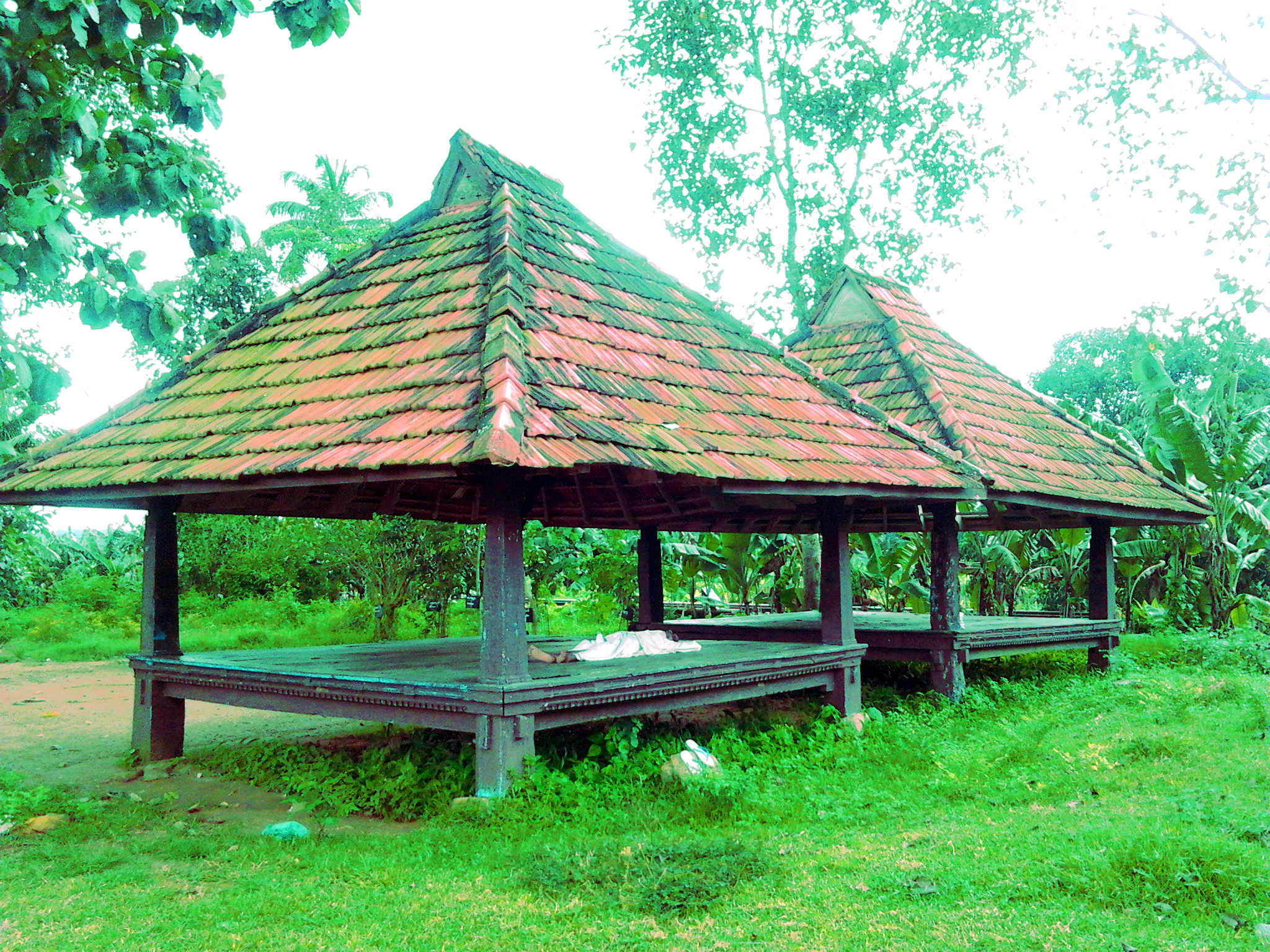
Kalithattu is a type of wayside public resting place in Kerala

The natural building materials available for construction in Kerala are stone, timber, clay, and palm leaves. Granite is a strong and durable building material; however, its availability is restricted mostly to the highlands and is scarcer in other regions. For this reason, the skills required for the quarrying, dressing, and sculpting of hard stone are rare in Kerala. Laterite, on the other hand, is the most abundant stone, found as outcrops in most zones. Soft laterite, which can be found at shallow depths, can be easily cut, dressed, and used as building blocks. It is a rare local stone that gets stronger and more durable with exposure to atmospheric air. Laterite blocks may be bonded in mortars of shell lime, the classic binding material in traditional buildings. The strength and performance of lime mortar can be improved using admixtures of vegetable juices. Such enriched mortars are used for plastering or serve as the base for mural painting and low-relief work. Timber is the primary structural material, being abundantly available in many varieties in Kerala – from bamboo to teak. The skillful choice of timber, accurate joinery, artful assembly, and delicate carving of woodwork for columns, walls, and roof frames could be considered unique characteristics of Kerala architecture. Clay is used in many forms – for walling, filling the timber floors, and making bricks and tiles after pugging and tempering with admixtures. Palm leaves, ricestraw and bamboos are used to thatch roofs and make partition walls.

Due to the limitations of materials, a mixed mode of construction was developed in Kerala architecture. Stonework was restricted to the plinth, even in important buildings such as temples. Laterite was used for walls. Timber roof structures were covered with palm leaf thatching for most buildings and on rare occasions with tiles for palaces or temples. The exterior of the laterite walls was either left as such or plastered with lime mortar to serve as the base for mural painting. The sculpting of the stone mainly took the form of moulding in horizontal bands in the plinth portion (adhistans) whereas the carving of timber covered all elements – pillars, beams, ceiling, rafters, and supporting brackets. The Kerala murals are paintings with vegetable dyes on wet walls in subdued shades of brown. The indigenous adoption of the available raw materials and their transformation as enduring media for architectural expression thus became the dominant feature of the Kerala style.

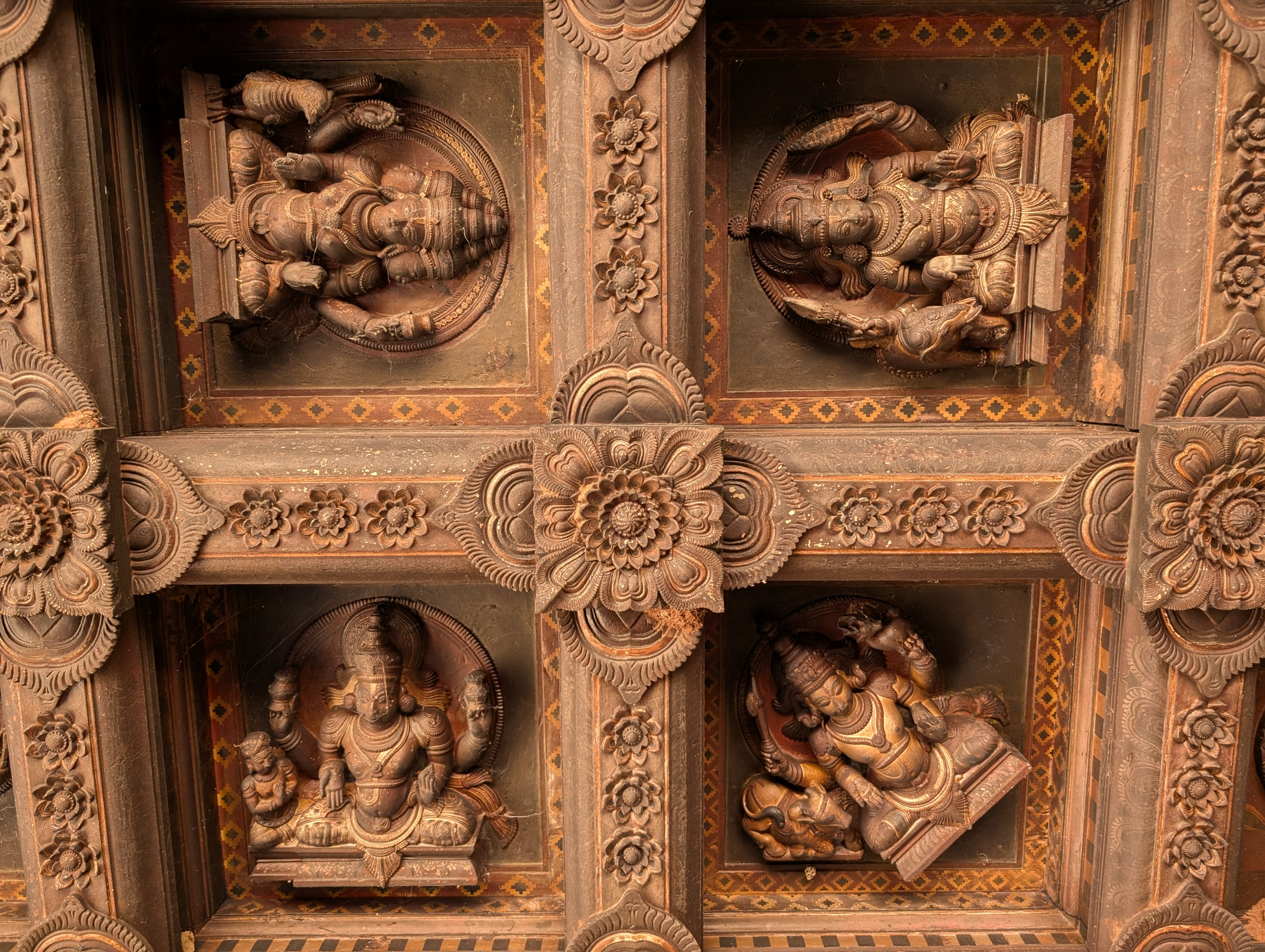
Wood carved ceilings of Sree Madiyan Koolom temple

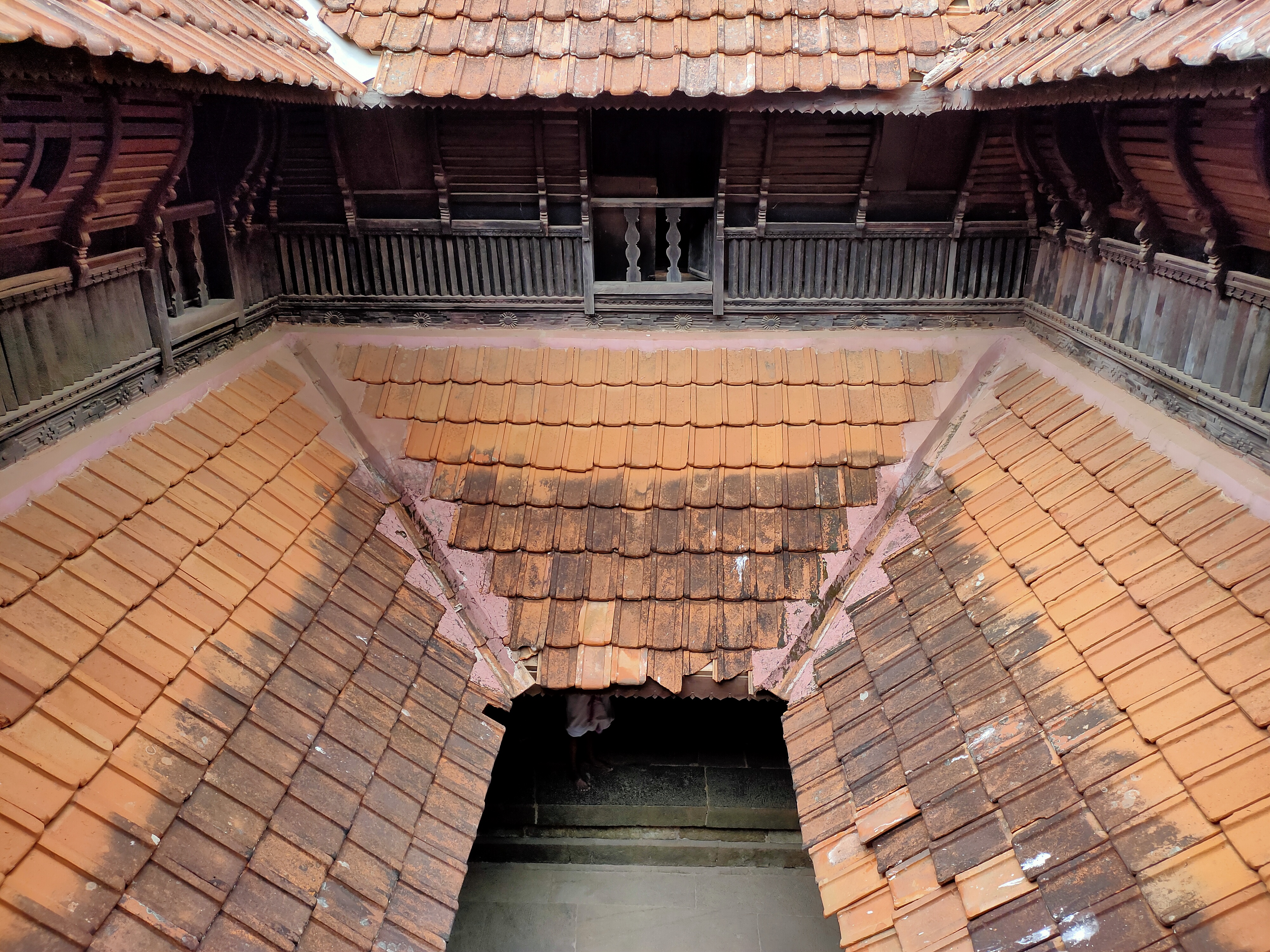
Traditional courtyard (nadumuttom) surrounded by woodwork window benches (charupadi)

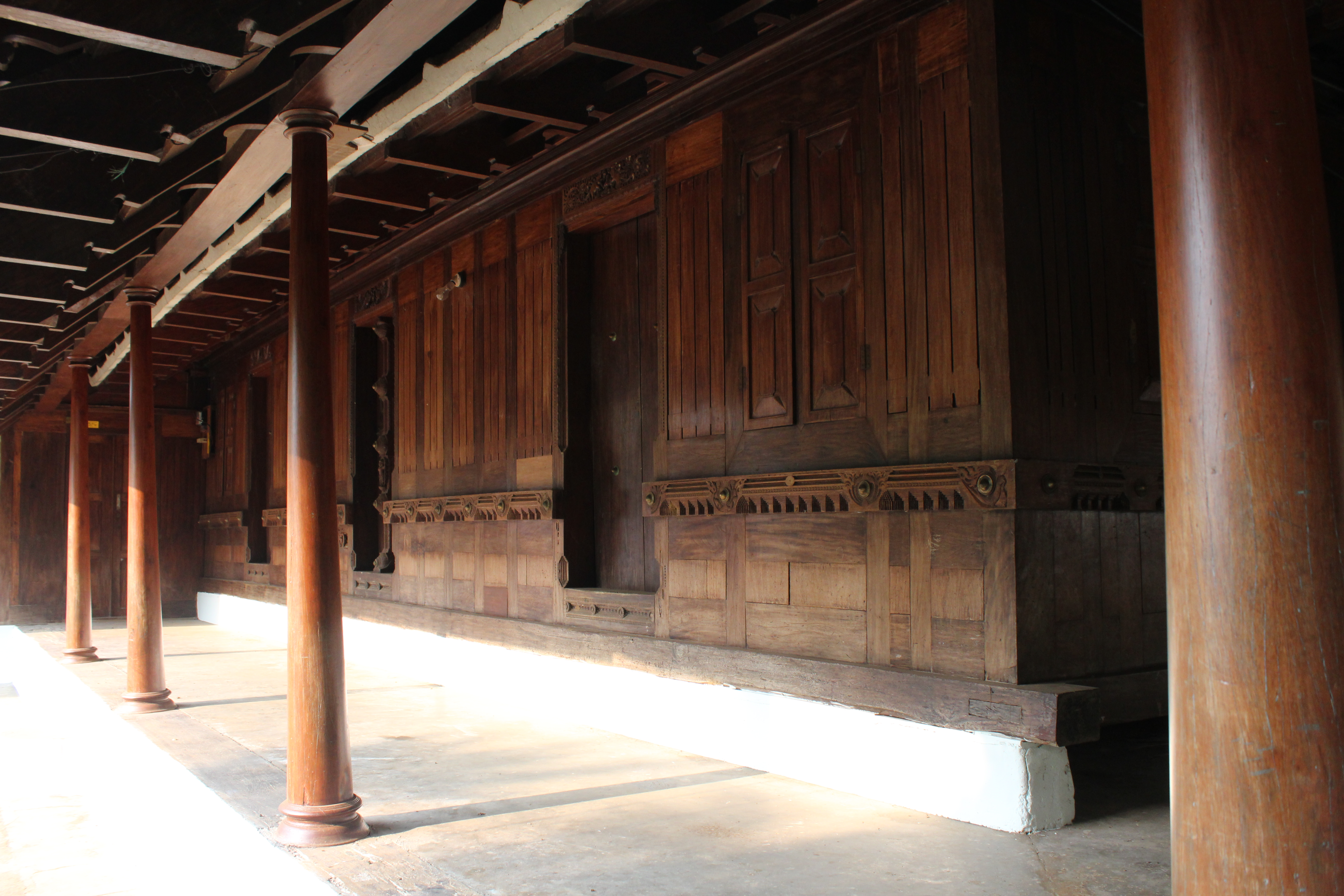
Wooden-panel walls (arayum) and verandah (chuttu). Wooden houses follow a traditional prefabricated system of construction.

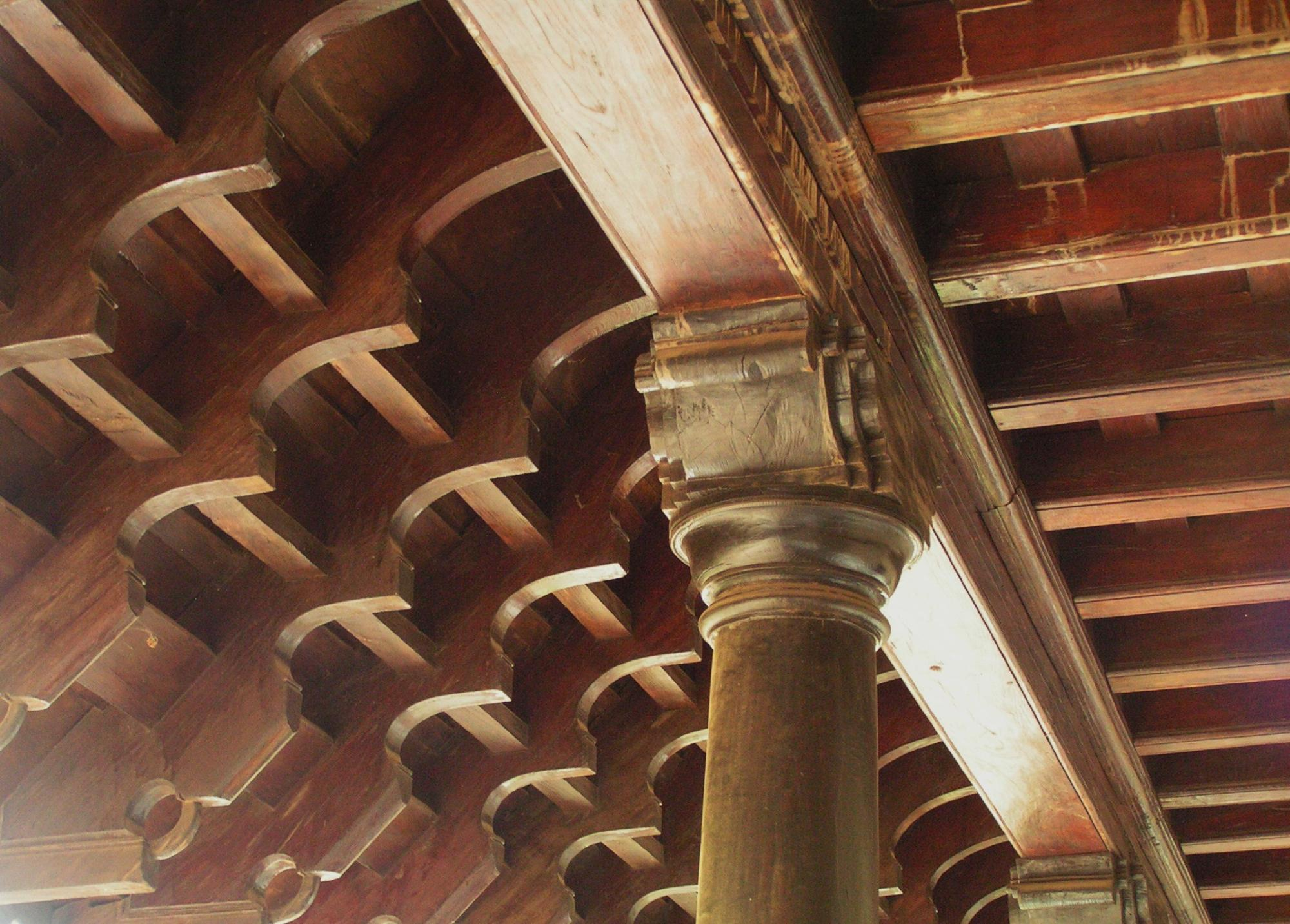
Traditional rafters called kazhukol and uttaram

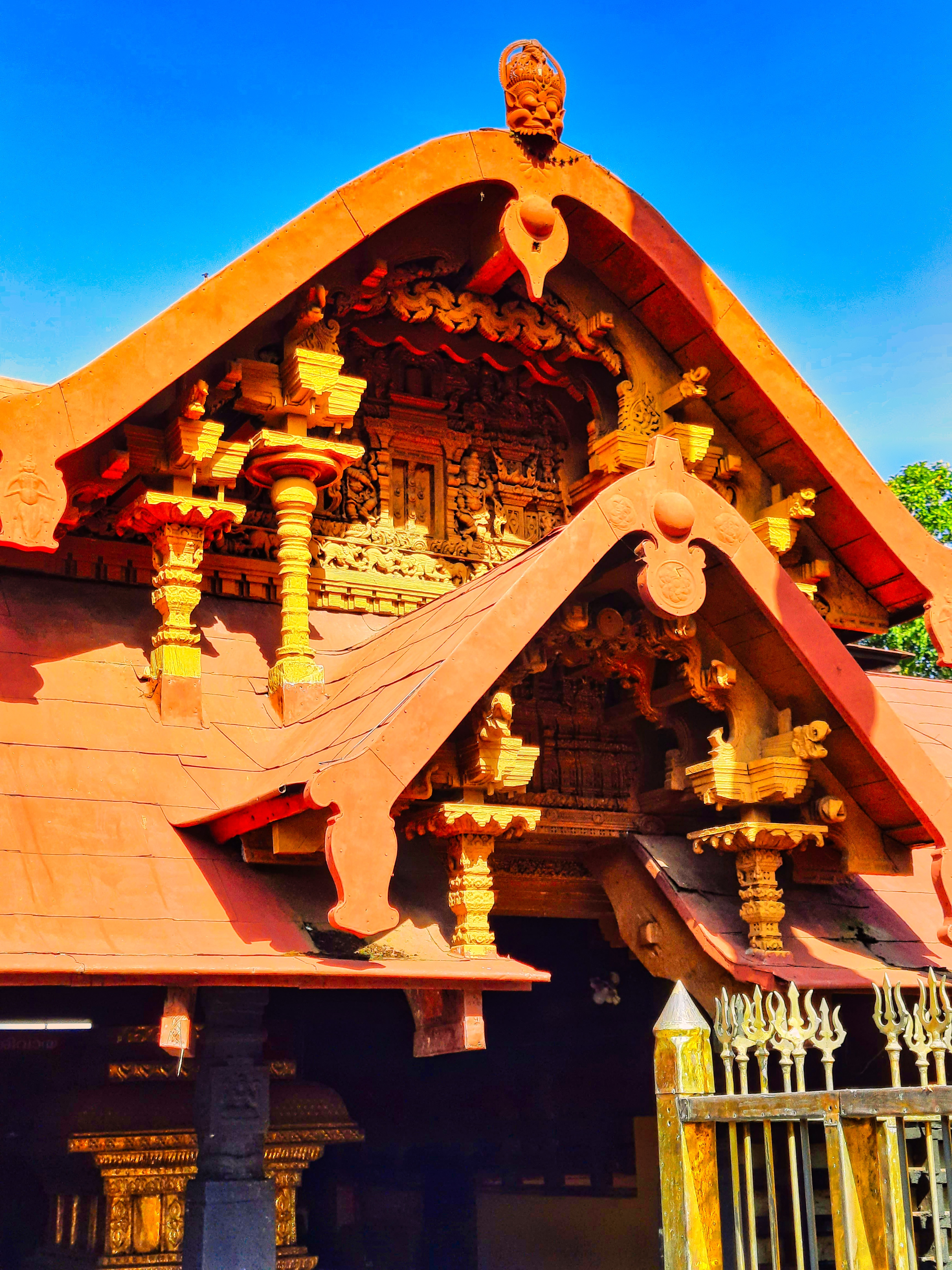
Traditional ornate gable (mukhappu) of temple

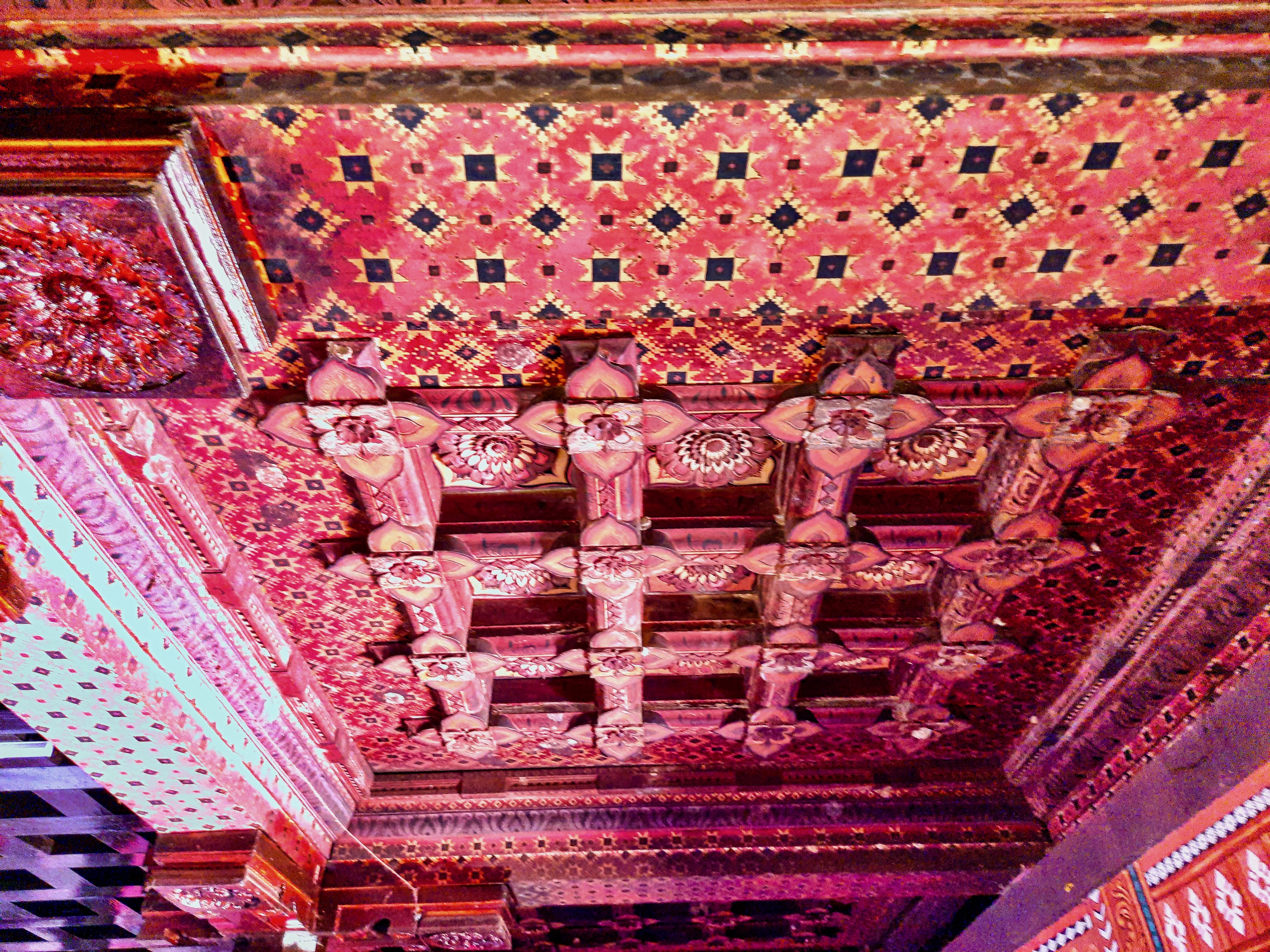
Painted wooden ceiling at Cherrukunnu Annapurneshwari temple

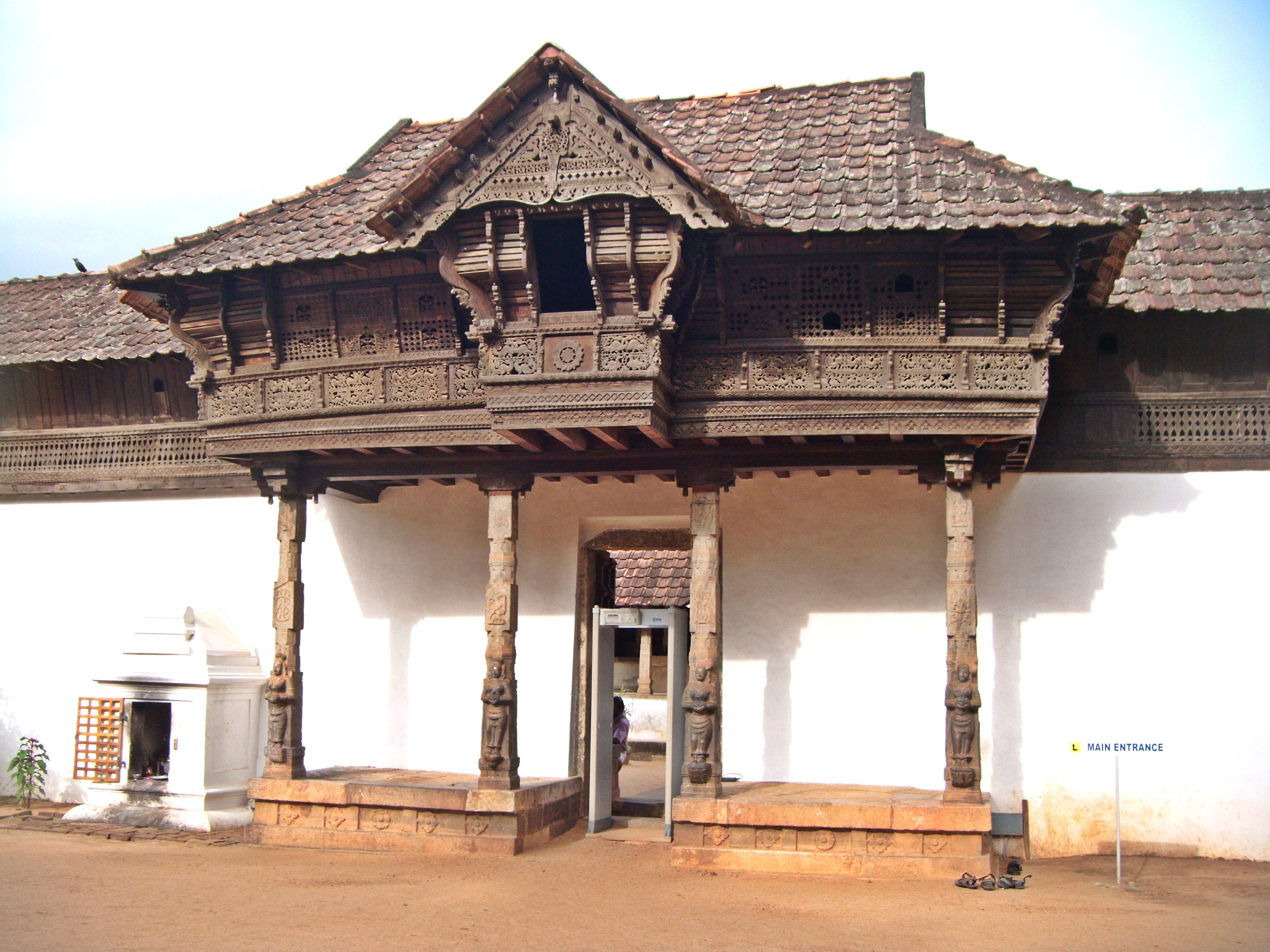
Eloborate compound gateway (padippura) used in domestic architecture

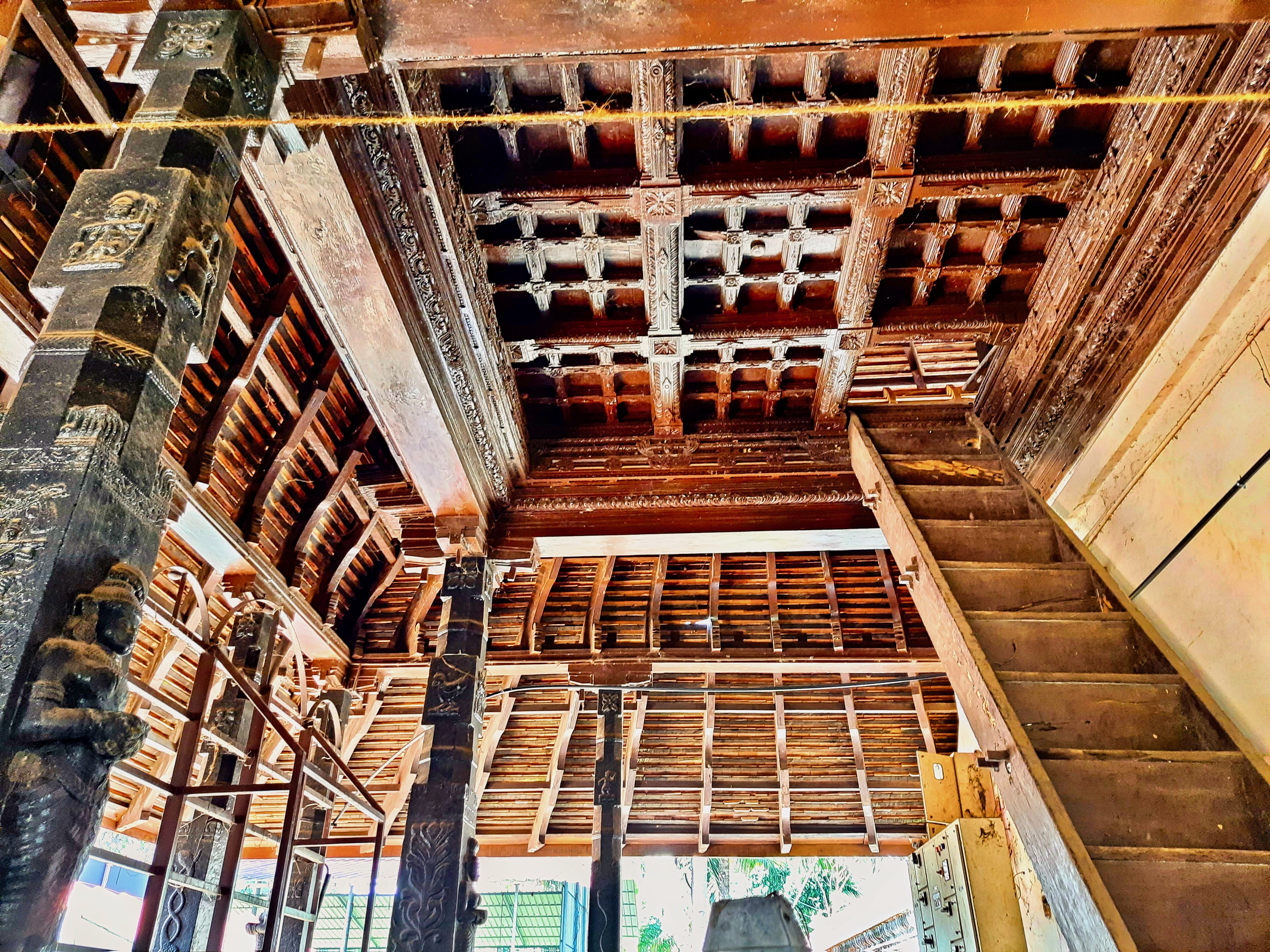
Traditional rafters, wooden ceiling and wooden stairs.

== Religious architecture ==
=== Temple architecture ===
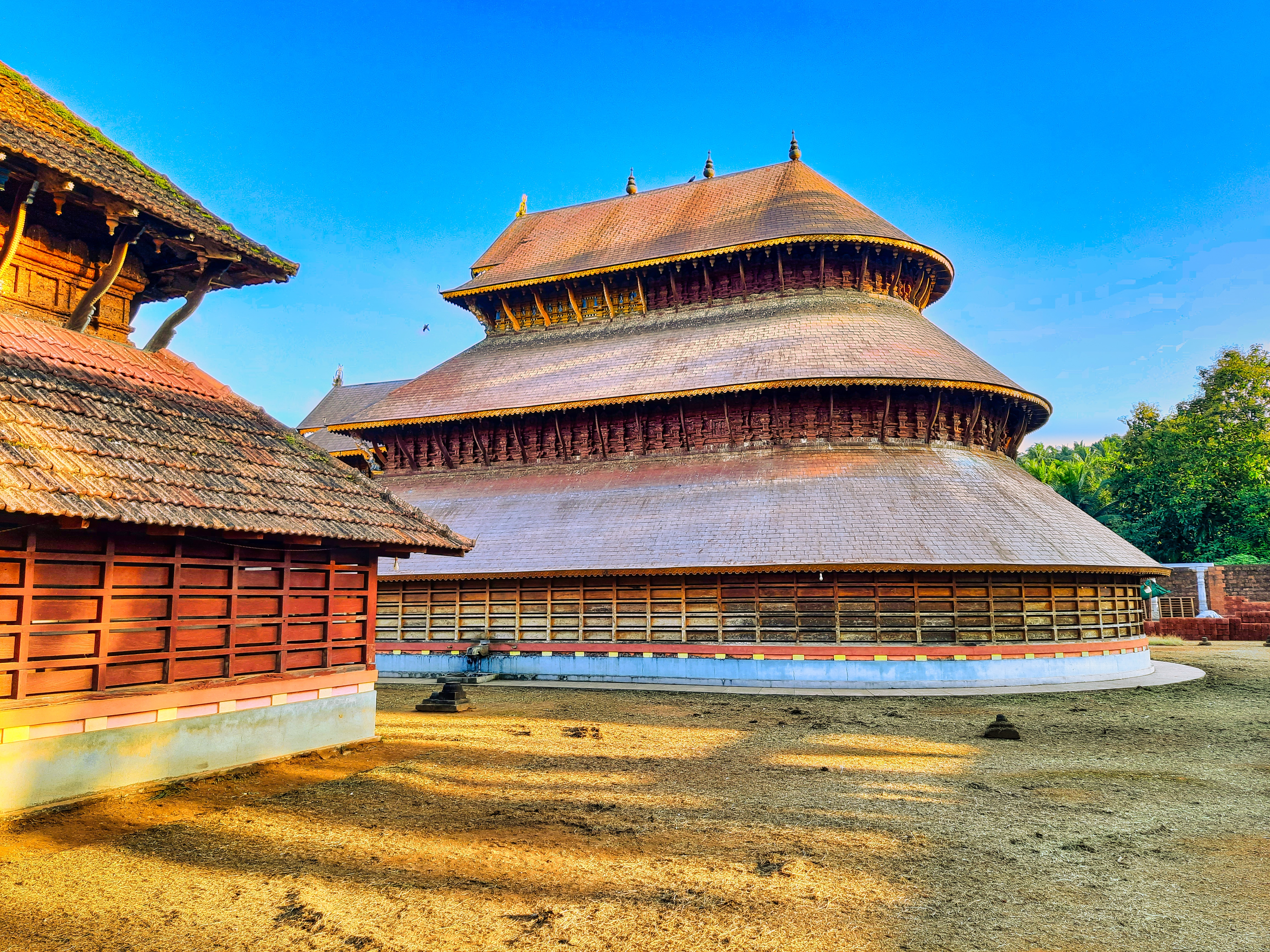
Madhur Temple, Kasaragod, Kerala

Compared to other Indian regions, Kerala state has a large number of Hindu temples – almost 3000 – with a variety of structures. The temples of Kerala developed in strict accordance with two temple construction theses: Thantra-Samuchayam and Shilparatnam. The former deals in developing structures that regulate energy flows so that positive energy flows in and negative energy does not remain stuck within the structure; the latter deals in developing stone and timber architecture in such manner that each carved structure is imbibed with a life and personality of its own.

An important technical feature of the temple architecture of Kerala is the construction technique of using a dimensional standardisation. The nucleus of the temple plan is the shrine containing the garbhagriha cell. The width of this cell is the basic module of the dimensional system. In plan composition, the width of the shrine, the open space around it, and the position and sizes of the surrounding structures are all related to the standard module. In vertical composition, this dimensional co-ordination is carried right up to the minute construction details such as the size of pillars, wall plates, and rafters. The canonical rules of the proportionate system are given in the treatises and preserved by skilled craftsmen. This proportionate system has ensured uniformity in architectural style irrespective of the geographical distribution and scale of construction.

==== Key features ====
===== Sri-kovil =====
The sri-kovil (sanctum sanctorum) is where the idol of the presiding deity is installed and worshiped. It is an independent structure, detached from other buildings with no connections, and sharing its roof with no other buildings. The sri-kovil does not have any windows and has only one large door opening most often towards the east (or sometimes towards the west; a few temples have a north-facing door as their specialty, while no temples have a south-facing door).

The sri-kovil may be built on different plan shapes – square, rectangular, circular, or apsidal. Of these, the square plan shows an even distribution throughout Kerala. The square shape is basically the form of the Vedic fire altar and strongly suggests the Vedic mooring. It is categorized as the 'Nagara style' in the architectural texts. The rectangular plan is favored for the Ananthasai Vishnu (Lord Vishnu in reclining posture) and the Sapta Matrikas (Seven Mother Goddesses). The circular plan and the apsidal plan are rare in other parts of India and unknown even in the civil architecture of Kerala, but they constitute an important group of temples. The circular plan is more common in the southern part of Kerala, in regions once under the influence of Buddhism. The apsidal plan is a combination of the semicircle and the square, and is distributed sporadically over the whole coastal region. Circular temples belong to the 'Vasara' category. A variation of circle-ellipse is also seen as an exception in the Siva shrine at Vaikkom. Polygonal shapes belonging to the Dravida category are rarely adopted in temple plans, but they find use as a feature of shikhara. As per the Thantra-Samuchayam, every sri-kovil should be built either neutral or even-sided.

For the unitary temples, the overall height is taken as 13/7 to 2 and 1/8 of the width of the shrine, and categorized into five classes – santhika, purshtika, yayada, achudha, and savakamika – each with increasing height of the temple form. The total height is divided into two halves. The lower half consists of the basement, the pillar or the wall (stambha or bhithi), and the entablature (prasthara) in a ratio of 1:2:1 in height. Similarly, the upper half is divided into the neck (griva), the roof tower (shikhara), and the finial (kalasham) in the same ratio. The foundation (adhisthana) is generally granite but the superstructure is built out of laterite. The roofs are usually taller than other temple structures. The structural roof of the shrine is constructed as a corbelled dome of masonry; however, to protect it from the vagaries of climate, a functional roof is superimposed on it, made from a timber frame covered with planks and tiles. This sloping roof with its projecting eaves is a characteristic form of Kerala temples. The finial, made of copper, provides the crowning spire and denotes the shrine wherein the idol is installed.

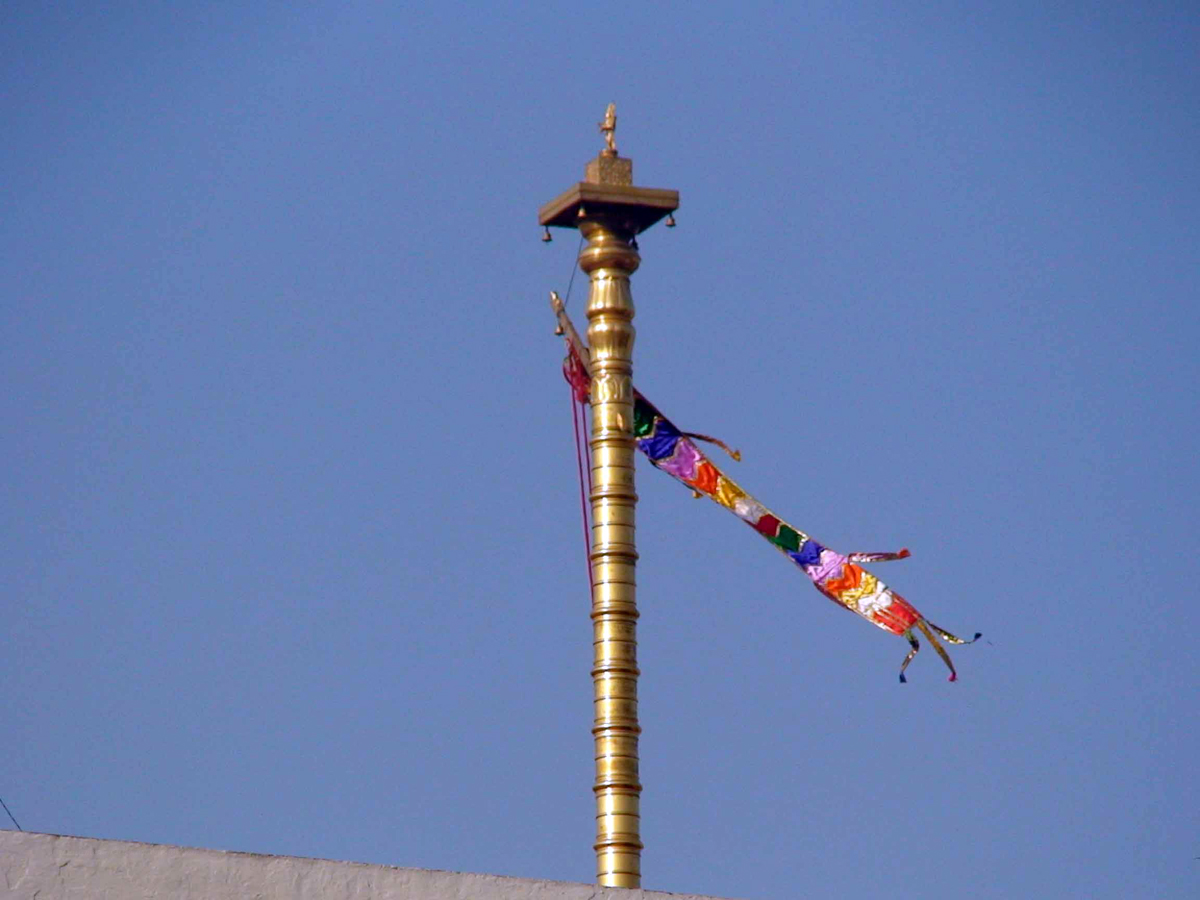
Flag post (dwajastambam) normally seen in Kerala temples

The Sri-Kovil is usually on a raised platform with a flight of 3, 5, or more steps (called the Sopanapadi), which are flanked by two large guardian statues known as Dwarapalakas (door guards). As per Kerala ritual customs, only the main priest (Thantri) and second priest (Melshanti) are allowed to enter into the Sri-Kovil.

===== Namaskara mandapam =====
The Namaskara Mandapa is a square-shaped pavilion with a raised platform, set of pillars, and pyramidal roof. The size of the mandapa is decided by the width of the shrine cell. The pavilion in its simplest form has four corner pillars, but larger pavilions are provided with two sets of pillars – four inside and twelve outside. Pavilions of circular, elliptical, and polygonal shapes are mentioned in the texts, but they are not seen in the Kerala temples. Mandapams are used to conduct Vedic-Thantric rites.

===== Nalambalam =====
The shrine and the mandapa building are enclosed in a rectangular structure called the nalambalam. Functionally, the rear and side halls of the nalambalam serve various purposes related to ritualistic worship. The front hall is pierced with the entry, dividing it into two parts: Agrashalas, which are used for feeding Brahmans and performing yagas; and koothuambalams, which are used for displaying murals and staging temple arts such as Koodiyattam or "Kathakali". Occasionally, koothuambalams are built as separate structures outside of the Nalambalam.

===== Balithara =====
At the entrance of the nalambalam, a square-shaped raised stone altar called the balithara can be seen. This altar is used to make ritualistic offerings to demi-gods and other spirits. Inside the nalambalam are several small round stones, called balikallukal, which are meant for the same purpose.

===== Chuttambalam =====
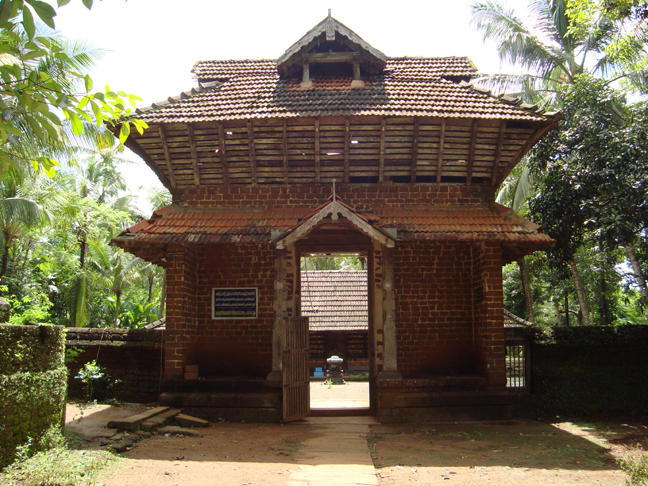
Gatehouse (goppuram) of a Kerala temple

The outer enclosure within the temple walls is known as a chuttambalam. Normally, the chuttambalam has a pillar-supported main pavilion (mukha-mandapam or thala-mandapam) that contains the sacred flag post (dwajastambam) at its center. The temple is fully enclosed by a massive wall (kshetra-madillukal) pierced with gatehouses (gopurams). These gatehouses are usually two-storeyed, and serve two purposes. The ground floor is an open space generally used as a platform for temple dances (such as kurathy dance or ottan thullal) during festivals. The upper floor with wooden trails covering the sides functions as a kottupura (a hall for drum beating).

The chuttambalam normally has four gates to enter from all sides. A stone paved walkway will be seen around the chuttambalam to allow devotees to circulate around the temple, which for some large temples is covered with a roof supported with massive pillars on both sides. The chuttambalam will have giant lamp-posts (dwajavillakku) in several places, mostly in the mukha-mandapam.

===== Koothambalam =====
A significant feature of big temple complexes is a theatre hall known as a koothambalam, used for dance, musical performance, and religious recitals. This is a unique component of Kerala temple architecture, distinct from the natyasabha or natyamandir seen in North Indian temples. The koothambalam is a large, high-roofed, pillared hall containing a stage (rangamandapam) used for performances. The stage as well as the pillars are ornately decorated. Visual and acoustic considerations are incorporated in the layout of the pillars and construction details so that the performances can be enjoyed by the spectators without discomfort and distortion. The koothambalam design seems to have been based on the canons given in the Natyasastra of Bharata Muni.

===== Ambala kulam =====
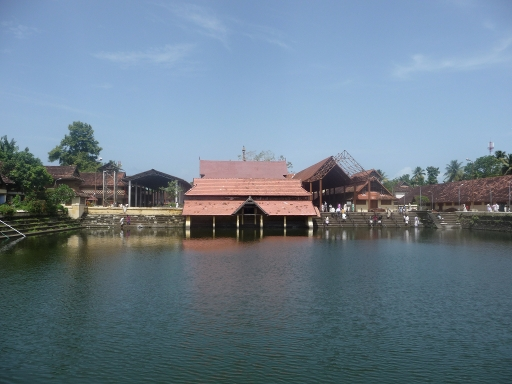
Temple pond (ambala kulam) at Ambalappuzha Sri Krishna Temple

Every temple has a sacred temple pond or lake (ambala kulam) located within the temple complex. As per Vastu rules, water is considered a source of positive energy and synthesis balance of all energies. The temple pond is used only by priests as a holy bath before the start of rituals, as well as for various sacred rituals within the temple. In a few cases, a separate pond will be constructed to allow devotees to bath before entering in temple. Today, several temples have a holy well (mani kenar) within the nalambalam to obtain sacred water for the purposes of Abisekham.

===== Thevarapura =====
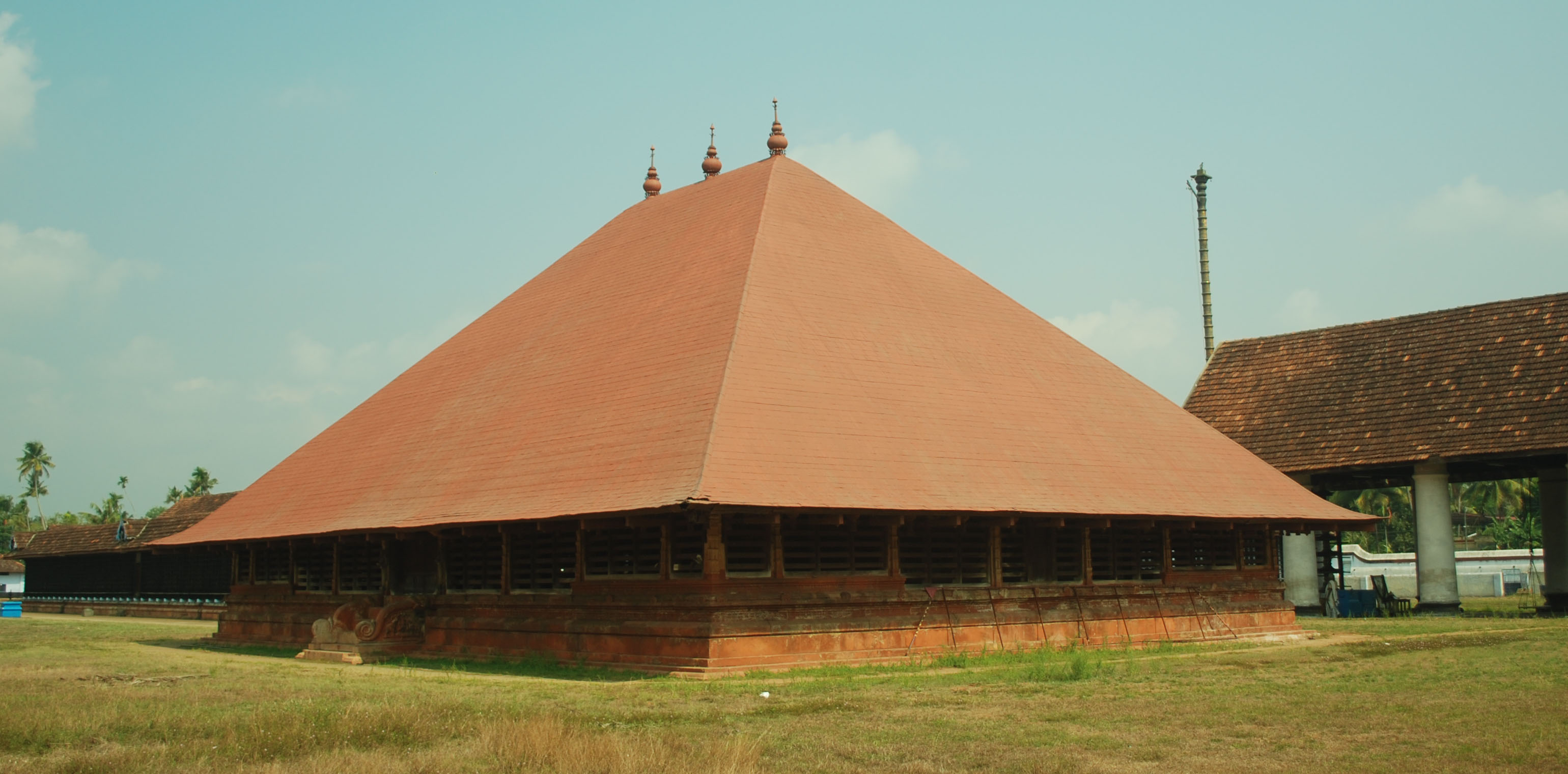
Koothuambalams are prime venues for the conduct of temple dances and other art forms. The height of a koothuambalam's roof is pyramidal, giving it a feeling of majesty and distance from the temple.

Within the nalambalam, a separate complex contains the cooking foods meant to serve the deity and for distribution among devotees as prasadam. Such complexes are called thevarapura, where the holy fire or Agni is invoked.

==== Phases of evolution ====
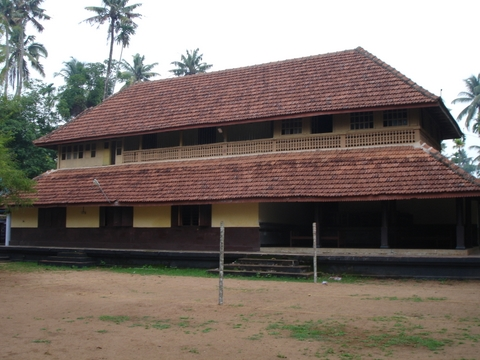
Paliyam nalukettu complex

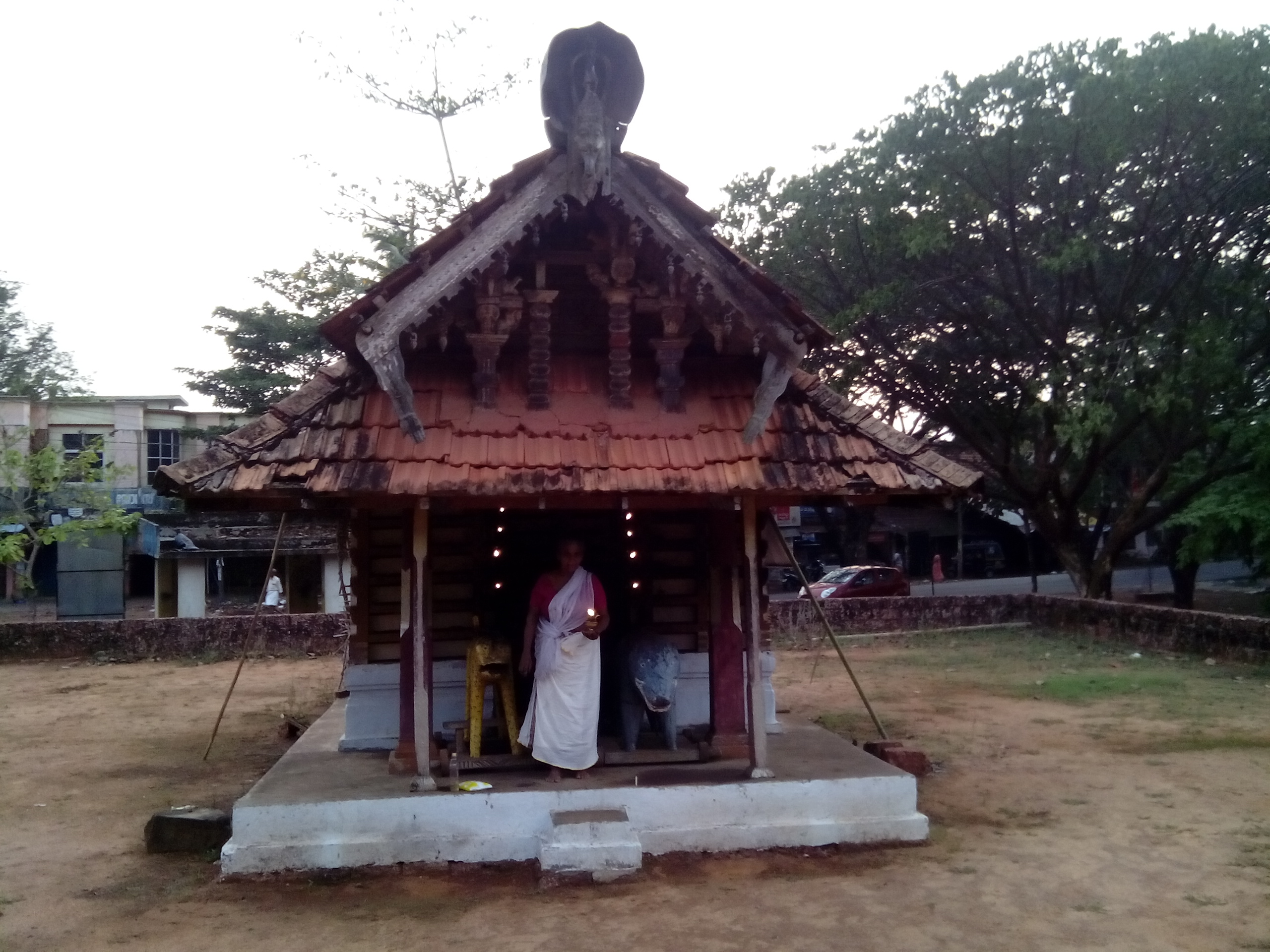
A madappura (standalone kovil (shrine)) from North Kerala where Theyyam rituals are performed seasonally. Noted for its standalone, singular, tile-roofed structure. All the Muthappan madappuras have a similar structure. These structures are found mainly in North Malabar region of Kerala.

Temple architecture can be divided into three phases of stylistic development.

The first phase is that of rock-cut temples. These early structures are all dated prior to the eighth century AD. Historically, cave architecture in India began with Buddhist cave temples; the technique of rock-cut architecture in Kerala seems to be a continuation of similar works in Tamil Nadu under the Pandyas. Rock-cut temples are mainly located in southern Kerala – at Vizhinjam and Ayirurpara near Tiruvananthapuram, Kottukal near Kollam, and Kaviyoor near Alappuzha. Of these, the one at Kaviyoor is the best example. The Kaviyoor cave temple dedicated to Siva comprises a shrine room and porch (ardhamandapa) arranged axially facing west. On the pillared facade as well as on the walls inside the ardhamandapa are sculptured reliefs of the donor, a bearded rishi, a seated four-armed Ganesh, and dwarapalas. The other cave temples also have this general pattern of a shrine and an anteroom, and are also associated with Siva worship. In the north, similar rock-cut temples of the Saiva cult are seen at Trikkur and Irunilamkode in Thrissur district.

The second phase spans the eighth to tenth centuries, and comprises temple structures patronised by the Chera, Ay and Mushika chieftains. During this phase, the nalambalam – the quadrangular building which encloses the shrine (sri-kovil), the namaskara mandapa, balikkal (altar stones), etc. – began to emerge, forming the basic layout of the Kerala temple. The earliest temples had a unitary shrine (nirendhara), which in rare cases was attached by a porch (ardhamandapa). A detached namaskara mandapa is generally built in front of the sri-kovil.

The middle phase of temple evolution is characterised by the emergence of the Sandhara shrine. In the unitary shrine of the earlier type, nirendhara (single level of sri-kovil), there is a cell with a single doorway. But in the Sandhara shrine, the cell has twin wells leaving a passage in between them. Also, there are often four functional doors in all four cardinal directions and windows to provide subdued light in the passage. Sometimes the functional doors on the sides and the rear are replaced by pseudo-doors.

The concept of the storeyed temple is also seen in this phase. The tower of the shrine rises to the second storey with a separate upper roof forming a dwitala (two-storied temple). The Shiva shrine at Peruvanam is a unique example of thrithala (three-storeyed temple), in which the lower two storeys are square and the third storey is octagonal.

In the last phase (1300–1800 AD), the stylistic development reached its apogee with greater complexity in the temple layout and elaboration of detail. The vilakkumadam (a palisade structure fixed with rows of oil lamps) was added as an outer ring beyond the nalambalam. The altar stone was also housed in a pillared structure (balikkal mandapam) in front of the agrasala (valiyambalam). A deepastambham and dwajasthambham (lamp post and flag mast) were added in front of the balikkal mandapam. Within the prakara but beyond the vilakkumadam, the secondary shrines of parivara devathas (sub-gods) stood in their assigned positions. These were generally unitary cells, though in a few cases each became a full-fledged shrine, such as in the case of Krishna shrine in the Siva temple at Tali, Kozhikode.

The last phase culminated in the concept of the composite shrines, in which two or three shrines of equal importance were cloistered inside a common nalambalam. The typical example of this is the Vadakkumnatha temple at Thrissur, wherein three shrines dedicated to Siva, Rama, and Sankaranarayana are located inside the nalambalam. The prakara may also contain temple tanks, vedapadhasalas, and dining halls. Paradoxically, some shrines do not have a single secondary shrine, the unique example being the Bharatha shrine at Irinjalakuda.

In the southernmost Kerala, the temple architecture was also influenced by the developments in Tamil Nadu. This influence is clearly seen at Sucheendram and Tiruvananthapuram. Here, lofty enclosures, sculptured corridors, and ornate mandapas all in granite stone practically conceal the view of the original main shrine in typical Kerala style. Also, the entrance gate (gopuram) is a tall tower, a style distinct from the usual two-storeyed structures.

==== Decoration ====
Temple architecture is a synthesis of engineering and decorative arts. The decorative elements of Kerala temples are of three types: mouldings, sculptures, and painting. The moulding is typically seen in the plinth where in horizontal hands of circular and rectangular projections and recesses in varying proportions help to emphasize the form of the adhisthana. Occasionally this plinth is raised over a secondary platform (upapeedam) with similar treatment. Mouldings are also seen in the mandapam, the handrails of the steps (sopanam), and even in the drain channels (pranala) of the shrine cell.

The sculptural work is of two types. One category is the low relief done on the outer walls of the shrine with masonry set in lime mortar and finished with plaster and painting. The second is the carving of timber elements: rafter ends, brackets, columns and capitals, door frames, wall plates, and beams. Decorative sculptural work is seen best in the ceiling panels of the mandapas. Exquisite lacquer work in brick red and black colour was adopted for turned columns of timber. Metal craft was also used in sculpturing idols, motifs, cladding, and finials. All sculptural works were done strictly according to the canons of proportions (ashtathala, navathala, and dasathala systems) applicable to different figures of men, gods, and goddesses, as prescribed in texts.

Painting was executed in organic pigments on walls when the plaster was still wet – in soft subdued colours, making them into a class designated as Kerala murals. The theme of these paintings is invariably mythological and the epic stories unfold as one circumambulates around the temple. The moulding, sculpture, and painting are also taken in vertical compositions to emphasise the different storey heights, projecting dormer windows which break the sloping roof, and the crowning finial. But in all cases, the decoration is secondary to the structural form. The sculptured walls are protected by the projecting caves, which shade them from bright exterior sunlight. This helps to impart the overall perceptual experience of light and shade revealing details only gradually to a keen observer.

==== Islamic Architecture ====
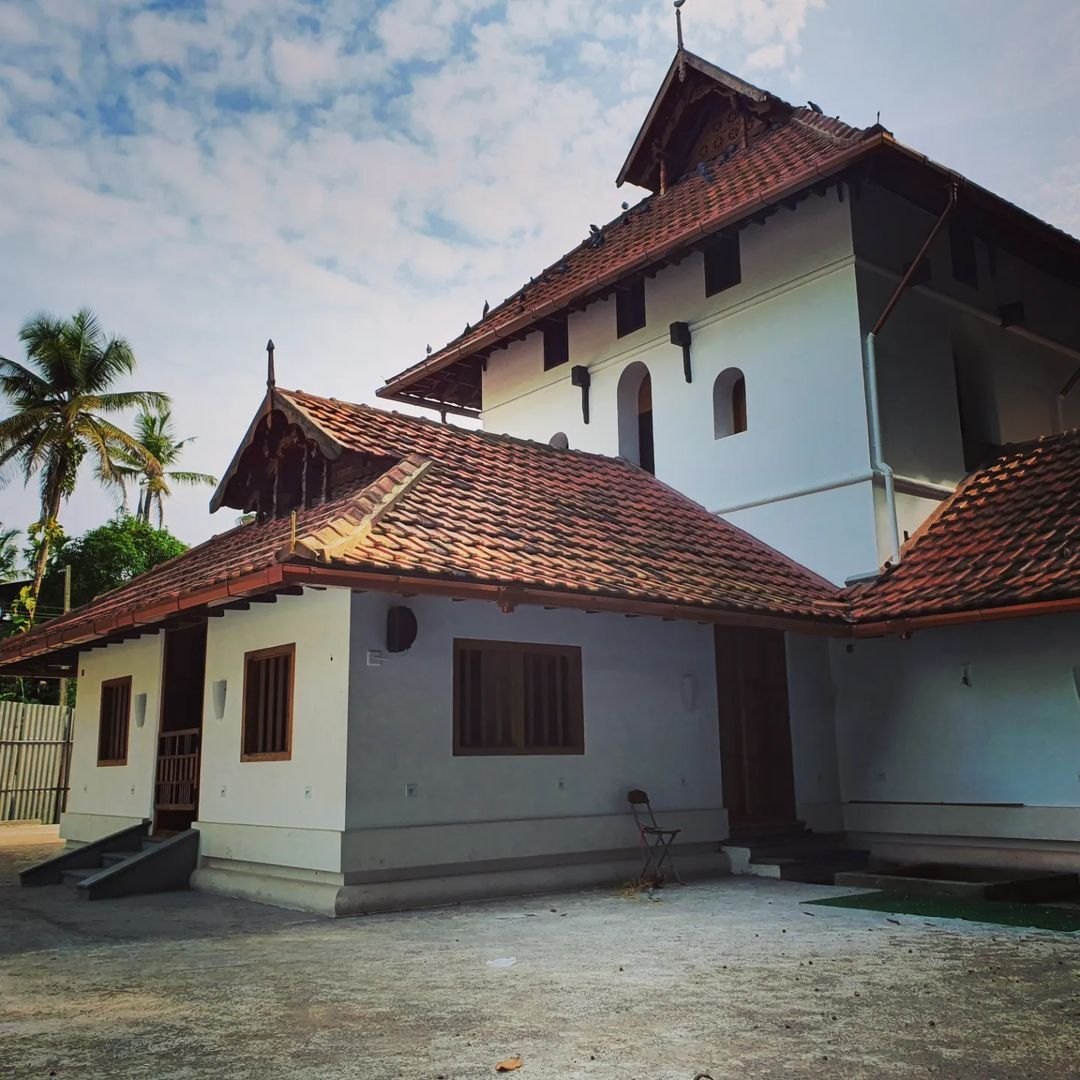
The Cheraman Mosque, claimed to be the world's second and India's first mosque, was originally built in Kerala style, and was renovated recently to give an Arabic touch.

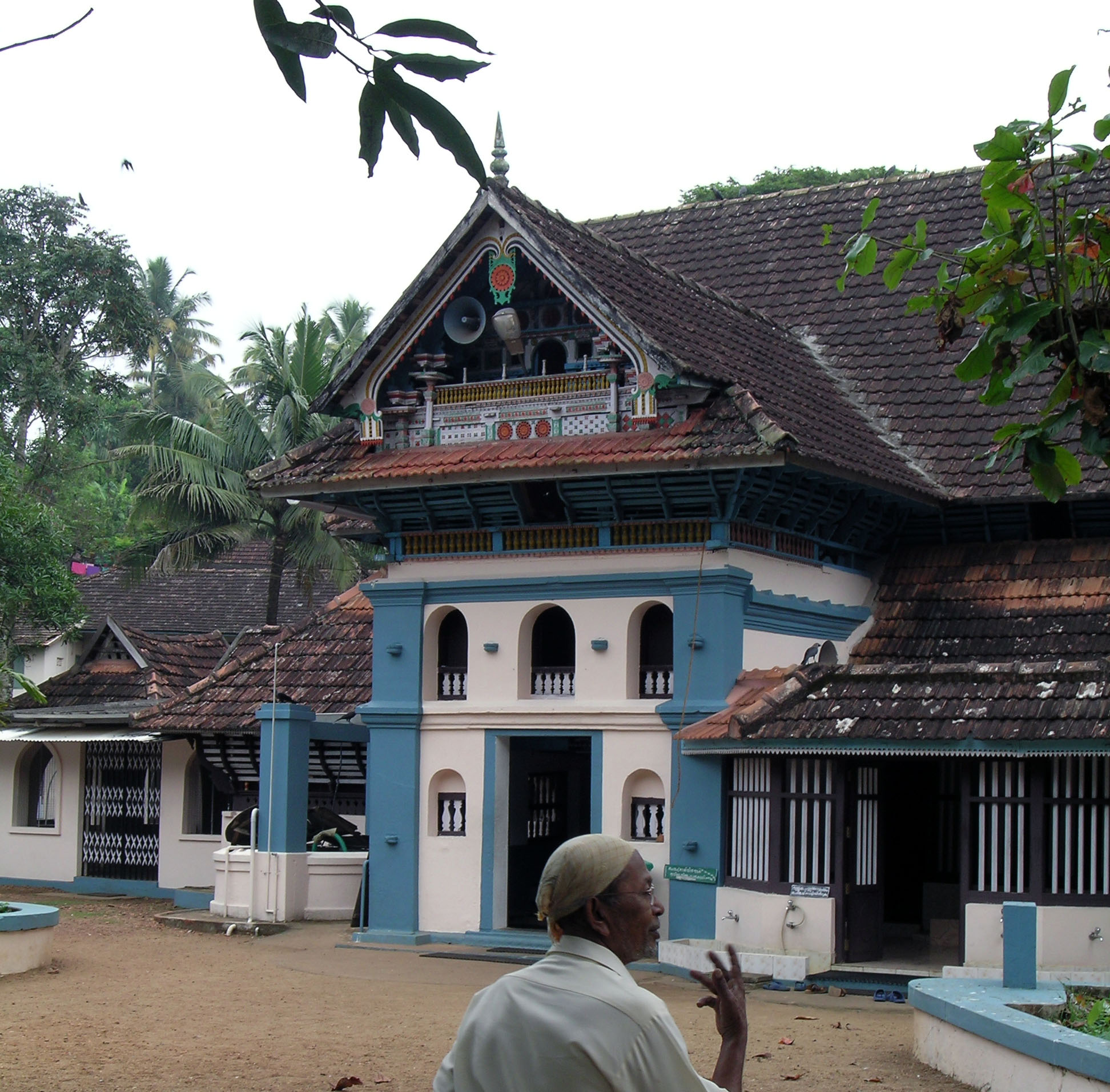
Example of Kerala style of mosque (Thazhathangady in Kottayam)

The Arabian Peninsula has had direct trade contact with the Kerala coast from very early times, as far as the time of Muhammad or even before. As local Muslim legends and tradition go, a Chera king embraced Islam and made a voyage to Mecca. On his return trip, accompanied by many Islamic religious leaders including Malik ibn Dinar, he fell sick and died. But he had given introductory letters for the party to proceed to Kodungallur. The visitors arrived and handed over the letter to the reigning King who treated the guests with all respect and extended facilities to establish their faith in the land. The king arranged for the artisans to build the first mosque at Kodungallur near the port and ear-marked the area around it for their settlement. The original mosque has undergone extensive repairs, but traces of the original construction from 11th century are seen in the plinth, columns, and roof, which are in the old traditional styles of Hindu temples. The Arabic inscription on a copper slab within the Madayi Mosque in Kannur records its foundation year as 1124 CE.

Islam spread in Kerala through the migration of new groups from the Arabian Peninsula and the gradual conversion of the native population in the permissive and all-accommodating Indian cultural ethos and social set up of Kerala. By twelfth century AD there were at least ten major settlements of Muslims distributed from Kollam in the south to Mangalore in the north, each centered on the mosque. Also, a branch of the ruling kingdom at Arakkal, Kannur, was converted to Islam. The primacy in trade, the spread of the faith, and the experience of the sea made Muslims a prominent class and dear to the rulers, especially of the Kozhikode Zamorins. Consequently, by fifteenth century Islamic constructions reached considerable heights.

The mosque architecture of Kerala exhibits none of the features of the Arabic style nor those of the Indo-Islamic architectures of the imperial or provincial school in North India. This is because mosques were constructed by local Malayali artisans under instruction of Muslim religious leaders. Since the only available models for places of worship were Hindu temples or theatre halls (koothambalam), these models were adapted. The early mosques in Kerala consequently resemble the traditional building of the region. Arabic style of architecture was introduced to the Malabar area of present-day Kerala during the 1970s West Asian emigration.

In plan the mosque comprises a large prayer hall with a mihrab on the western wall (since Mecca is west to Kerala) and surrounded by a covered verandah. Generally it has a tall basement similar to the adhistana of the Brahmanical temple and often the columns are treated with square and octagonal section as in mandapa pillars. The walls are made of laterite blocks. The arch form is seen in only one exceptional case, at the mosque at Ponnani. Wood was used extensively in the superstructure for the construction of the ceiling and roof. The roof in many cases is covered with sheets of copper incorporating finials in the ridge, completing the form of temple shikhara with the stupi. At Tanur, the Jama Masjid even has a gate built in the manner of temple gopuram, covered with copper sheeting. This mosque itself is a three-storeyed building with tiled roof crowned by five finials.

The pulpit in the mosque present fine examples of wood carvings associated with Islamic architecture of Kerala. At the Jama Masjid at Beypore and Mithqal Mosque at Kozhikode, the pulpit (mimbar) was built by the ship masters of the Arab vessels.

All other construction work was done by the same local craftsmen who built Hindu temples and residences. The Arabic tradition of simplicity of plan had perhaps combined itself with local construction techniques, giving rise to a unique style of mosque architecture not found anywhere else in the world. It contrasts with Indo-Islamic architecture, which drew inspiration from Turkish and Persian traditions and created highly ornamental style in North India. The typical Kerala mosques are seen at Kollampalli, near Kollam, Panthalayani near Koyilandy, Kozhikode, Tanur, Ponnani, and Kasargode as well as in most old Muslim settlements. In recent times, however, the austere architectural features of the old mosques are in the process of being replaced by Islamic architecture. The use of arcuated forms, domes, and minarets of the imperial school of Indo-Islamic architecture are being projected as the visible symbols of Islamic culture. The Jama Masjid at Palayam is an example of this new trend.

Perhaps the influence of Arabic style of Kerala construction is seen in a subtle manner in the secular architecture of Muslims. The bazar streets lined by buildings on both sides, the upper floor living rooms with view windows to the streets, the wooden screens used to provide privacy and shade in the verandahs (specially of upper floors) – these are a few features superposed on traditional construction. These built forms would have been modelled in the pattern of the houses in Arab countries (such as Egypt, Iraq, and Iran) having contact with this region. This trend is most conspicuous in market towns such as Kozhikode, Thalassery, and Kasaragode. Still, Muslim domestic architectures generally follows the traditional Hindu styles, often adopting the designs of ekasalas and nālukettus. These buildings with extensive alindams and verandahs are also seen generally surrounding the mosques in Muslim settlements.

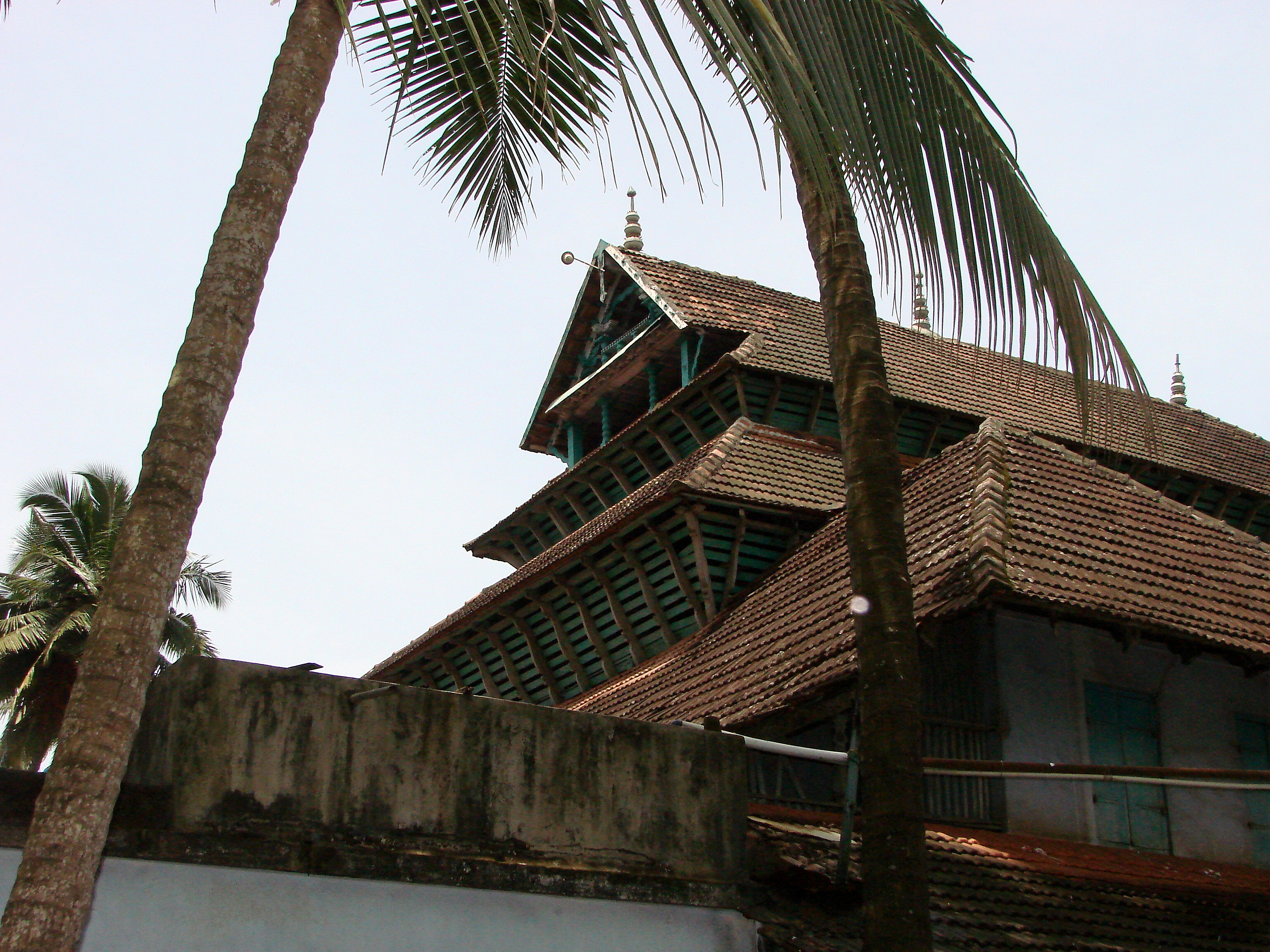
Mishkal Mosque in Kozhikode is a classic example of Kerala's native mosque style with gabled roofs, sloped wooden window panels, and without minarets.

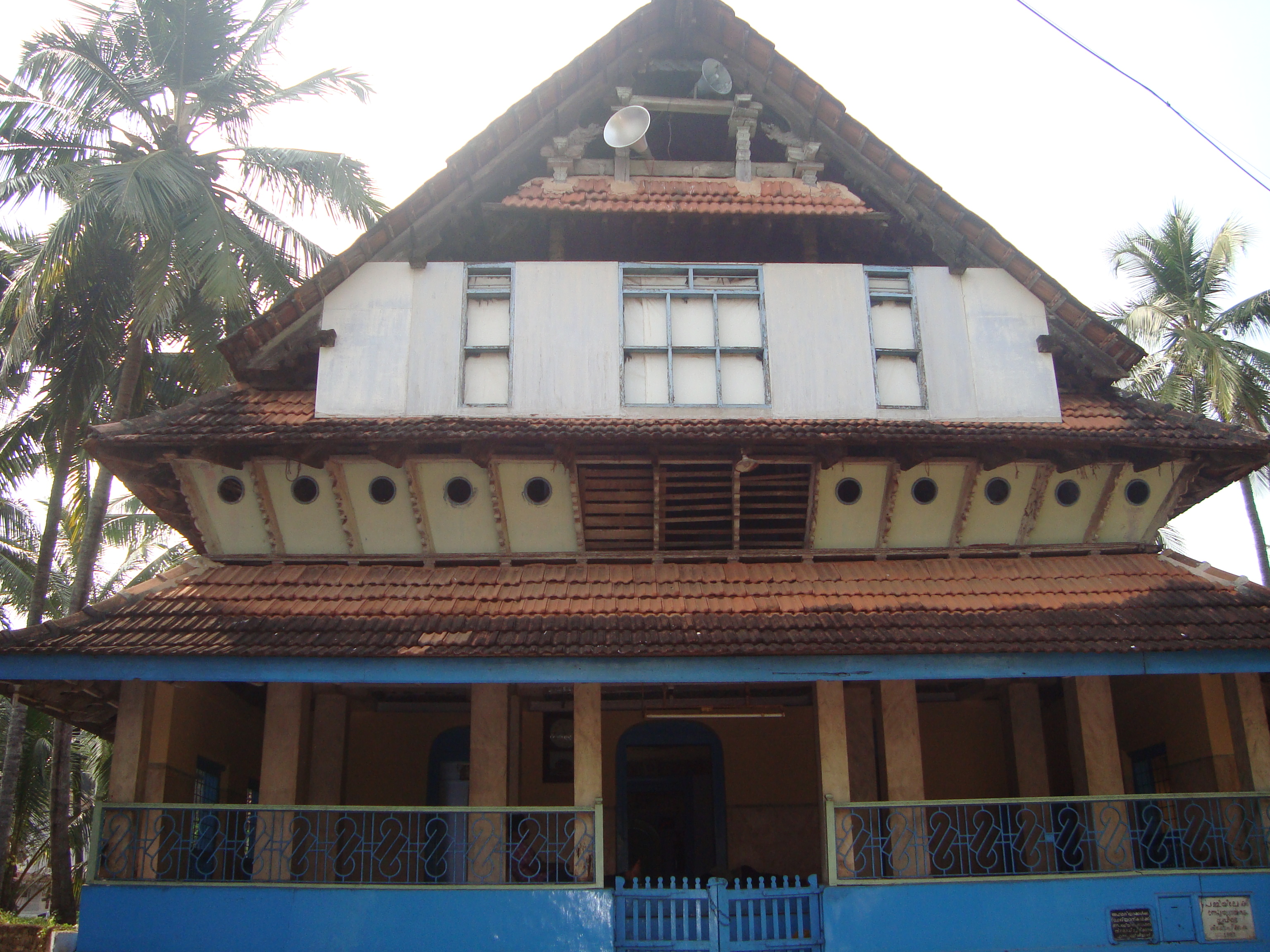
Muchundi Mosque, featuring classic Kerala styles

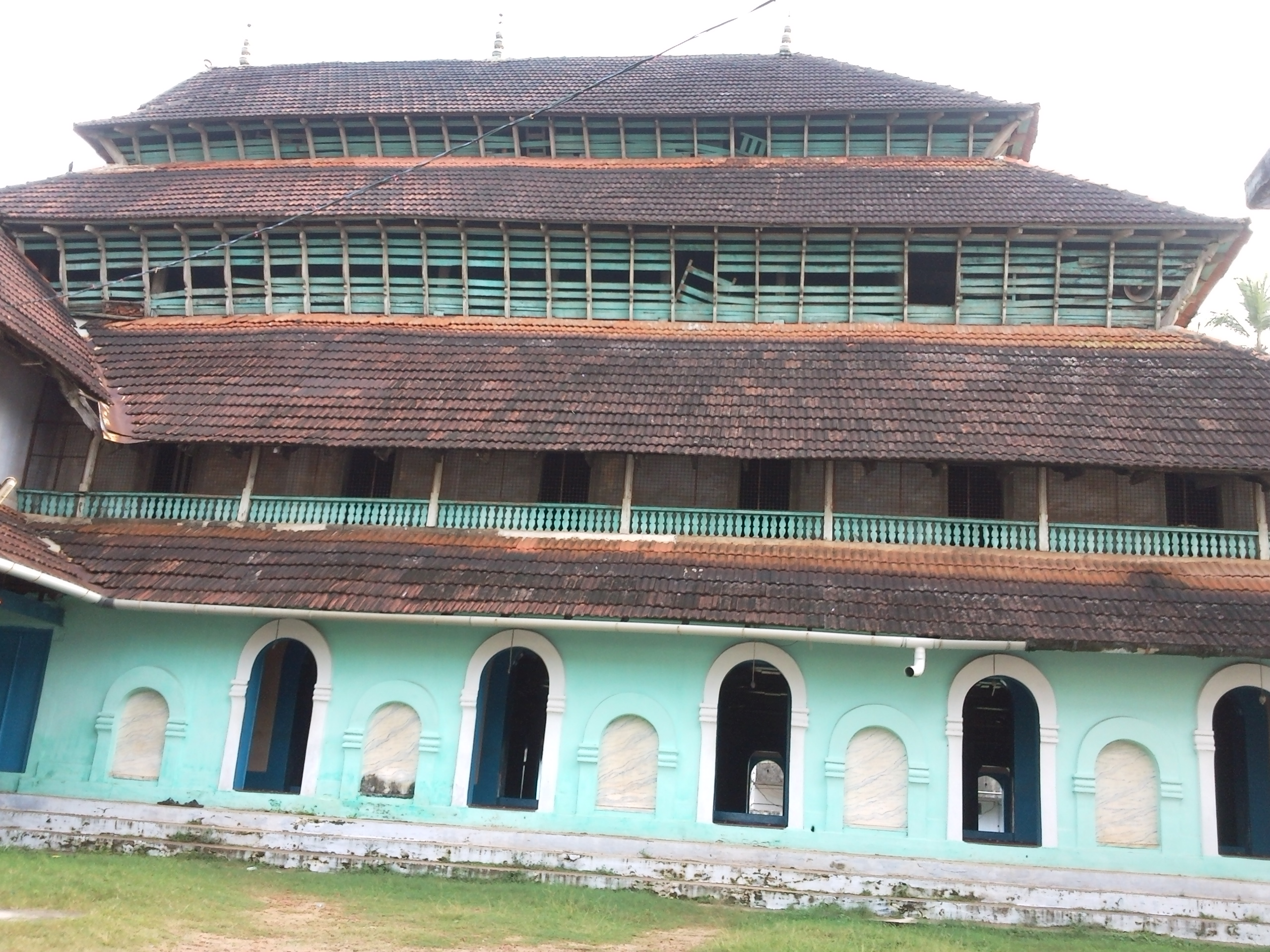
Miskal Mosque has three-storeyed gabled roofs with windows, which offer an alternative to minarets in traditional Kerala style.

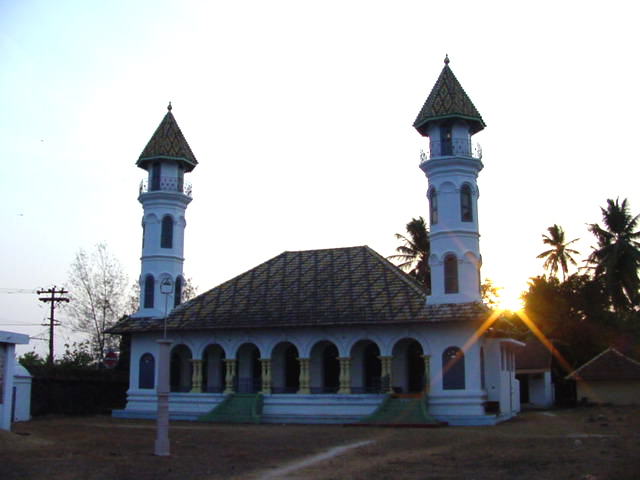
The Kannur Mosque symbolises the slow transit from Kerala style to Persian style with additions of minarets and other classical Persian features.

==== Church architecture ====
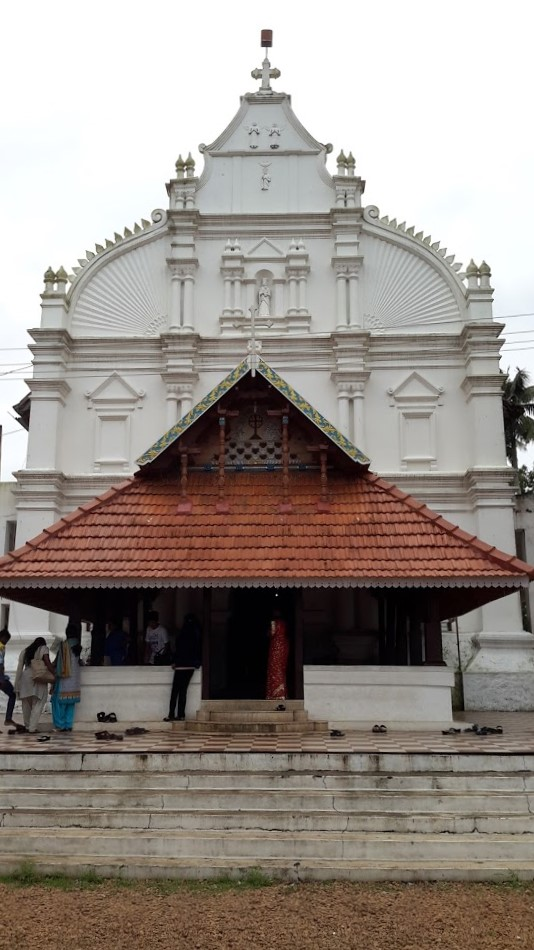
The Kadamattom Malankara Syrian Church near Muvattupuzha, is one of the oldest churches in Kerala, built in a mix of baroque and Kerala styles.

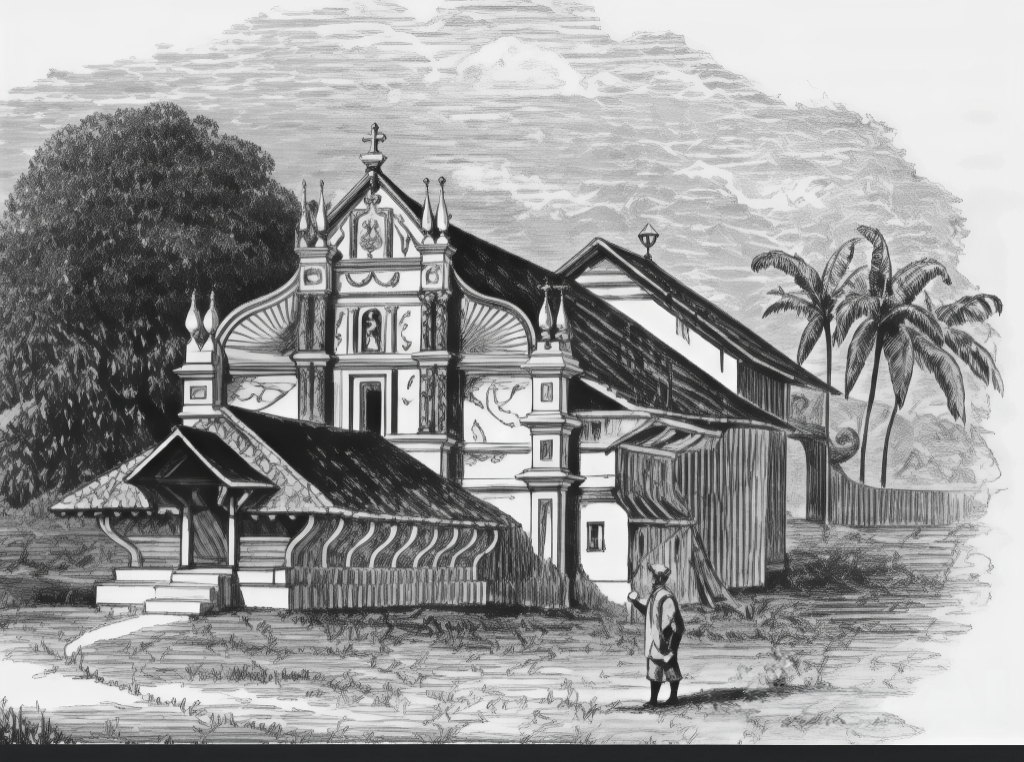
Old Karingachira Church which was seen by Anglican Missionary Dr. Claudius Buchanan in 1806

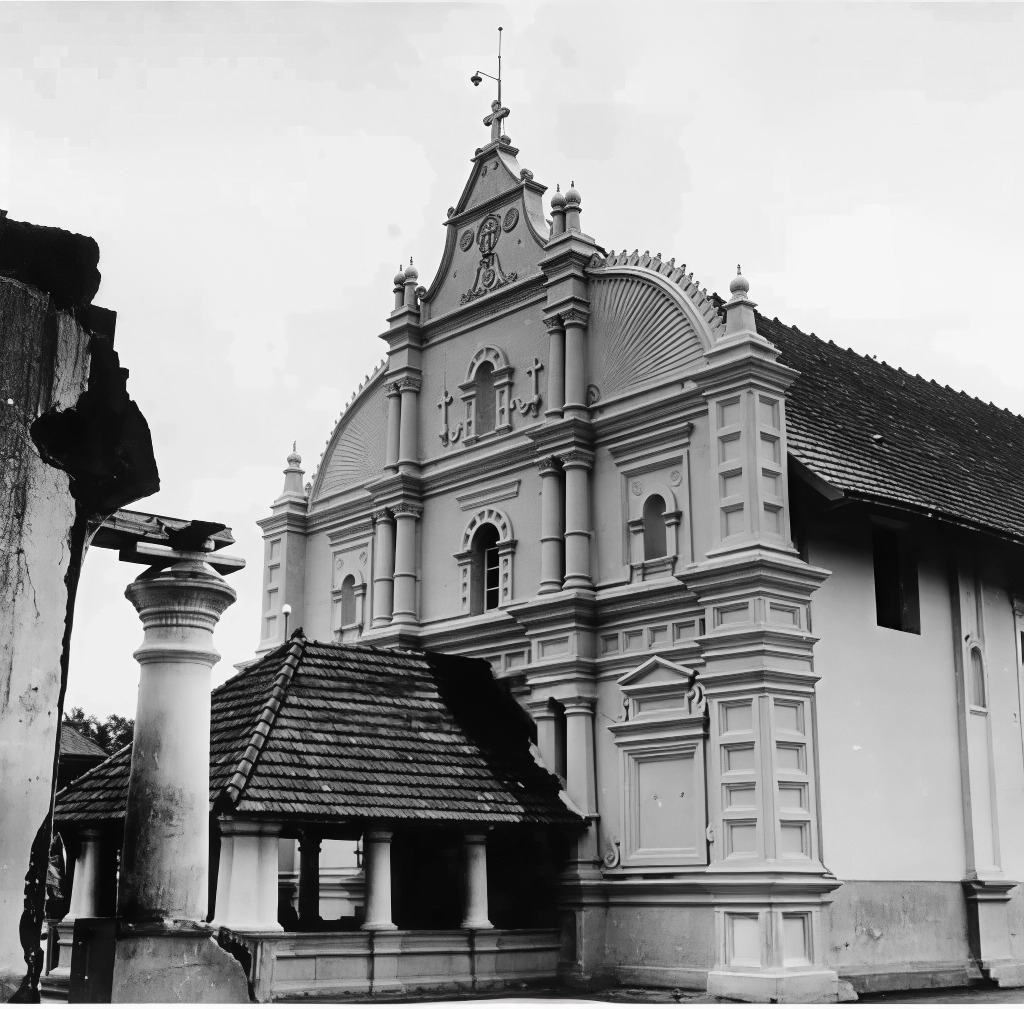
Old traditional architectural view of Marthoman Cheriyapally, Kothamangalam established in 1455

The evolution of Kerala church architecture comes from two sources: the work of Apostle St. Thomas and the Syrian Christians, and the missionary work of European settlers. Tradition has it that St. Thomas (who landed in Muziris in 52 AD) had seven Syrian churches built in Kerala – at Kodungallur, Chayil, Palur, Paravur-Kottakkavu, Kollam, Niranom and Kothamangalam – but none still exist. It is possible that some temples were adapted as Syrian churches for services by those who converted to Syriac Christianity. For example, the present Palur Syrian Church has preserved the abhisheka patra (the letter of intonation) and certain Shaiva symbols as relics of the old church, which is said to have been a Hindu shrine adapted for Christian worship.

Historical evidence suggests that the first wave of Christianity came from Edessa, Persia, in the fourth century AD due to the persecution of Syrian Christians in the Persian Empire. According to the narration of the Byzantine monk Cosmas, Kerala had many churches by the sixth century. According to the inscription of the times of Stanu Ravi, by the ninth century Syrian Christian communities enjoyed many rights and privileges. They also played a vital role in trade and commerce. The domestic buildings of the Syrian Christians were akin to the native architecture.

However, original Syrians who had migrated to Kerala had brought with them some of the West Asian conventions in church architecture. Consequently, churches with regular chancel and nave began to be built and there evolved a distinctive style of church architecture. The peculiar feature of this style was the ornamental gable facade at the nave end, surmounted by a cross. An entry porch (shala) in front of the nave was another feature of these early designs. The baptistry was a small chamber inside the nave near the entrance. Belfries were built on one side of the nave, but in smaller churches, the bell was hung in an opening in the nave gable.

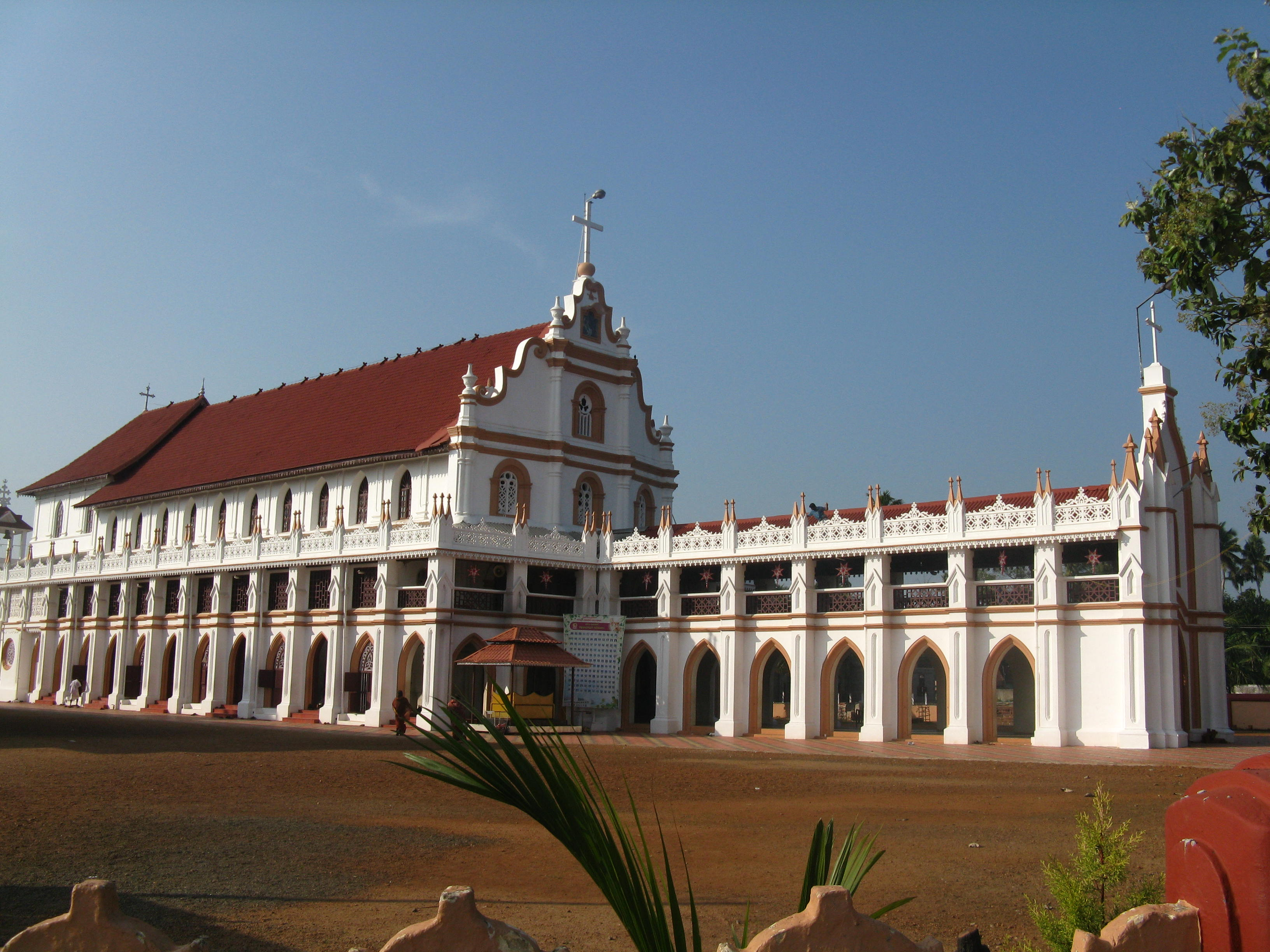
Edathua St. George Syro-Malabar Catholic Forane Church with a mixture of Portuguese and Kerala architecture

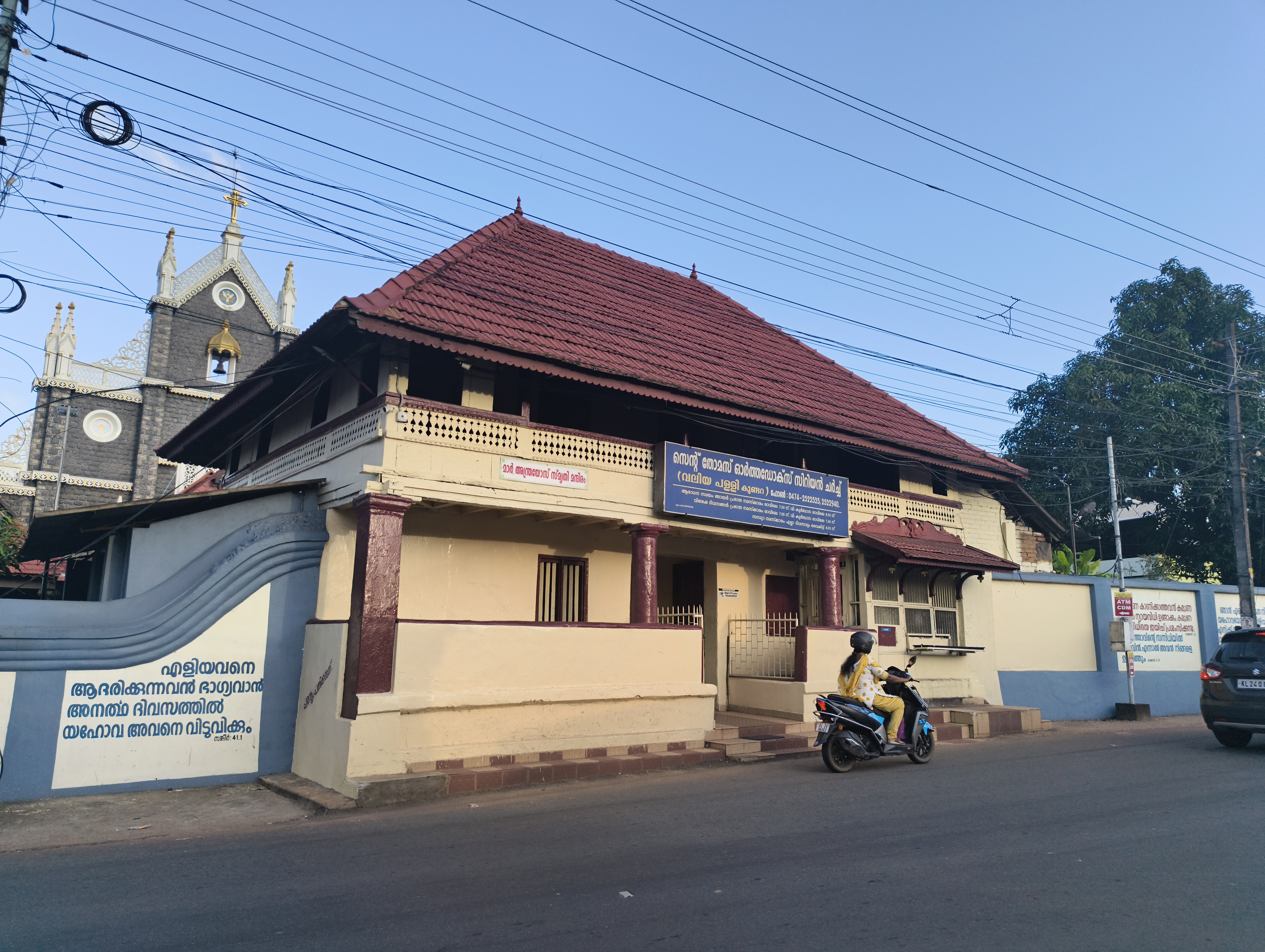
Old auxiliary building (Pallimeda) near St.Thomas Syrian Church in Kundara

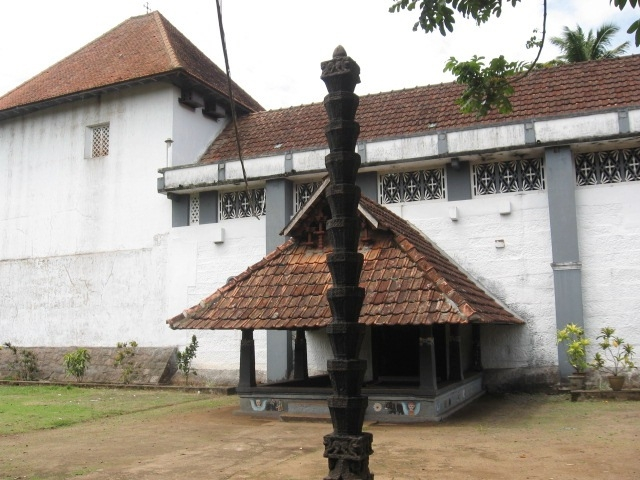
Like most Syrian Christian churches in Kerala, the Old Syrian church in Chengannur resembles Hindu temples, and typifies the merging of Kerala Christianity with native architecture.

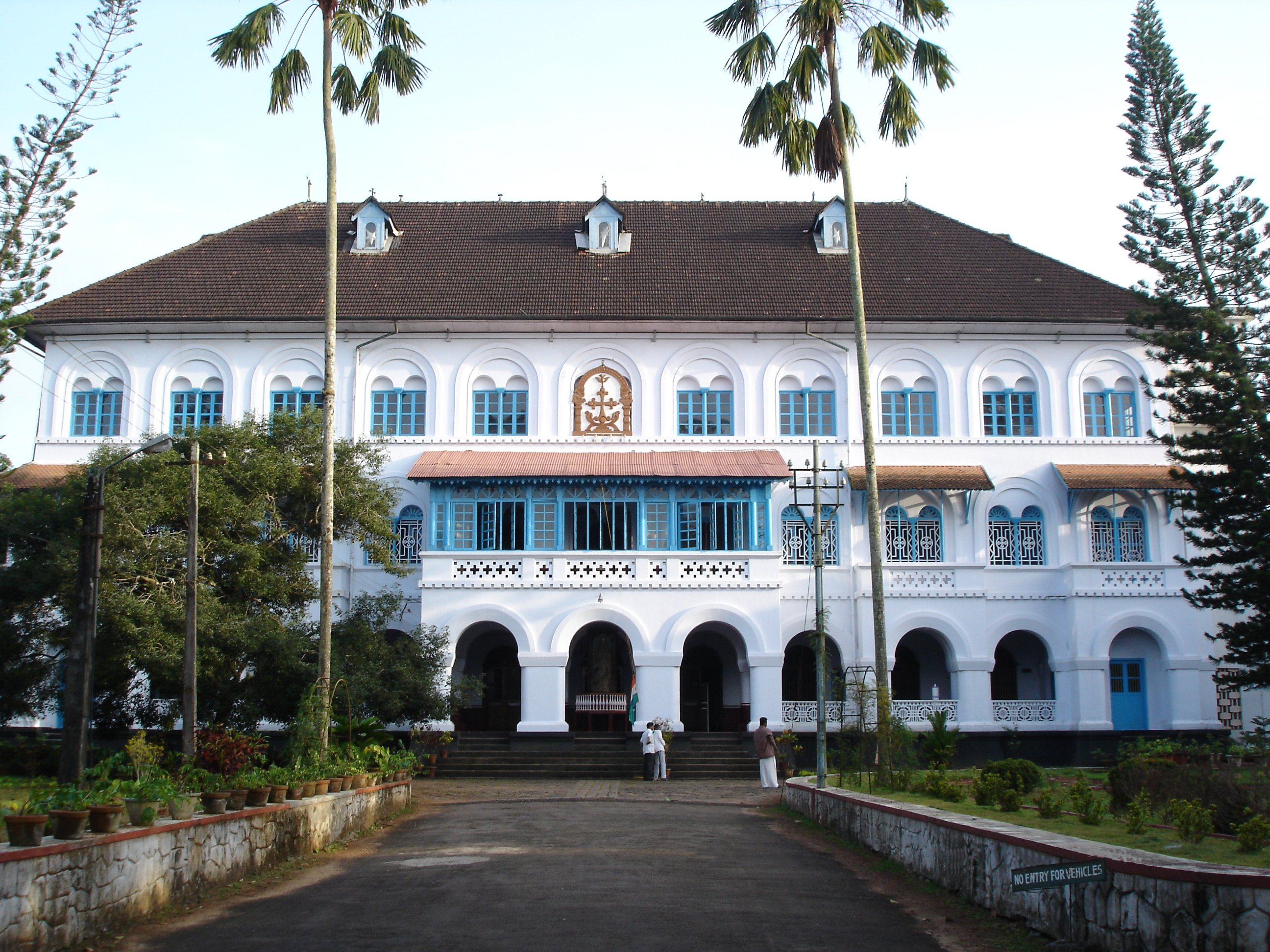
The Syro-Malabar Archbishop's Palace at Changassery is built assimilating Dutch architecture with Kerala's native styles.

===== Elements of Kerala church architecture =====
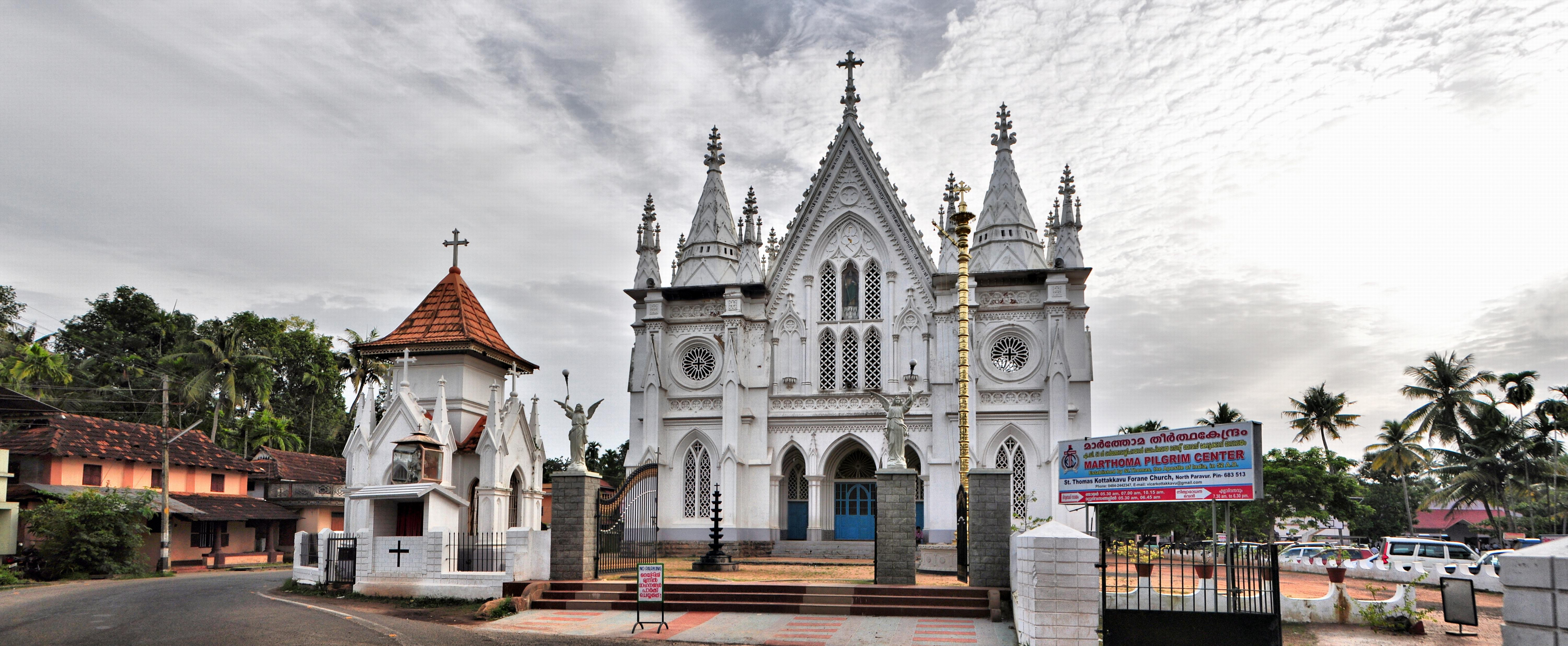
Kottakkavu Mar Thoma Syro-Malabar Catholic Church is a mixture of Portuguese, Kerala, and Dutch architecture

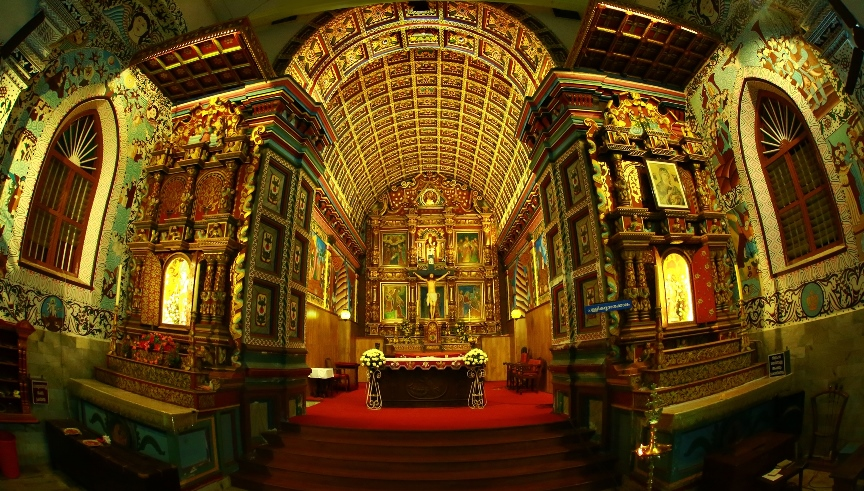
Altar-Kanjoor Church

Unlike temples, there is no uniform or standard layout for all churches in Kerala. Rather, most churches' architecture differs according to their sect and traditions apart from experimentation of new designs. Still, most churches, particularly the Saint Thomas Christian churches of Kerala, do share several common features.

These churches have a gable roof extending to the chancel – the most sacred part of the church – and the sacristy by its side. The tower over the chancel is higher than the roof of the nave, similar to the shikhara over the garbhagriha in a Hindu temple. The residence of the priest and the parish hall were located on one side of the church and the cemetery was on the other side.

In their external feature, Syrian churches retained some of the indigenous features of the Hindu style. The church and the ancillary buildings were enclosed in a massive laterite wall.

There was an open cross in front of the main entrance on a granite basement in the model of balikkal (altar stone). The church also had the flag mast (dwajastambha) in front. In the Orthodox Syrian church at Chengannur, Peter and Paul occupy the place of the guardian deities (dwarapalas) of a Hindu shrine. Sometimes a gateway like the temple gopuram, with a music room (kottupura) on the upper storey, was also provided. The Marth Mariam church at Kuravilangad, originally built in 345 AD, has undergone renovations several times. The church has a rich collection of old relics including a statue of Virgin Mary and a cross carved in granite. The Knanaya Valiapally of Kaduthuruthy is another old church with the biggest cross formed from a single granite piece. The Valiapally of Piravom is also another old church with old Persian writings.

Wood carving and mural paintings, two decorative traditions of temples, were also adopted in old churches. A famous piece of wooden carving is a large panel depicting the Last Supper in St. Thomas Church, Mulanthuruthy. The All Saints Church at Udayamperur has a beam resting on wooden mouldings of heads of elephants and rhinoceros. Floral figures, angels, and apostles are the usual motifs of mural paintings. This form of decoration continued in later churches as well. In St. Sebastian's church at Kanjoor, a mural even depicts a battle between the British and Tippu Sultan.

===== Colonial influences in church architecture =====
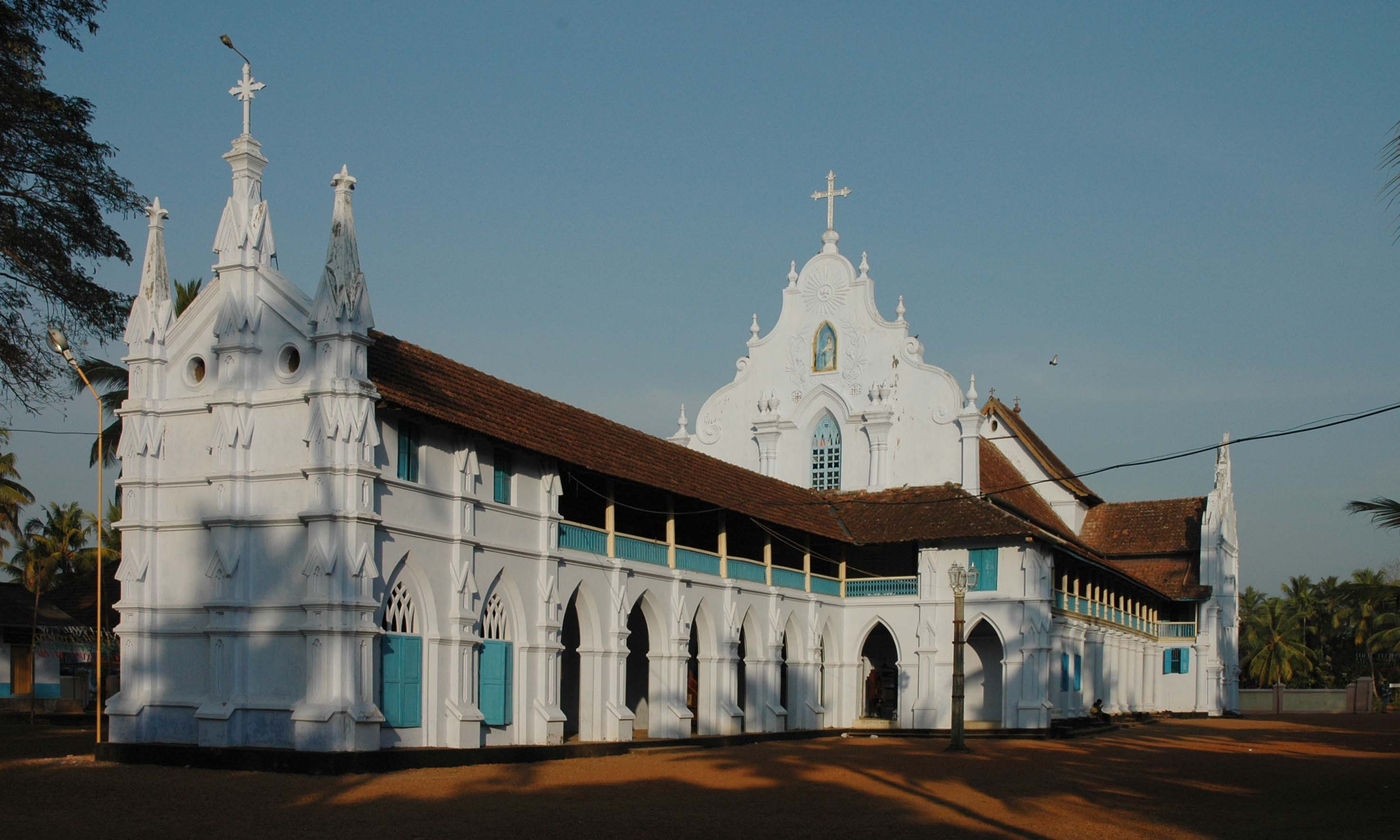
Church with Dutch architectural patterns assimilated into the Kerala style

The Portuguese were the first to introduce European styles to the church architecture of Kerala, followed by the Dutch and British. The first church of this type in India was built by Franciscan missionaries in 1510 at Fort Kochi. It is a small unpretentious building of the medieval Spanish type. When Vasco da Gama died in Kochi in 1524, his body was interred in this church and later removed to Lisbon in 1538. The church thus came to be known as "Vasco da Gama's Church". It was later seized by the Dutch and was used for reformed services. Later, with British occupation of Kochi, it became an Anglican church and presently it belongs to the Church of South India.

The Portuguese introduced many innovations to Kerala church architecture. For the first time, the dominating tower above the altar, originally adapted from temple architecture, was discarded. Inside the church, the granite images were not favoured owing to their association with the Hindu art; instead, wooden images of saints were used. Generally, pulpits were erected and altar pieces were impressively ornamented. Ceilings and walls were painted with religious themes in the style of European masters. Pointed and rounded arches were introduced and stained-glass windows were installed.

Subsequent development in church architecture during the British period also saw the introduction of a new church design. In place of the rectangular Basilican plan, the cross-shaped plan became increasingly popular, especially in places where large congregations had to be accommodated. Apart from the symbolism of the cross, this plan is better suited for visibility of the altar from all points in the church. Furthermore, sufficient space was now available at the transepts for additional altars for services by several priests on important occasions like Christmas.

Externally, the central tower (or rather, the Roman dome) appeared at the centre of the transept, imparting a classic form of European architecture. Belfry towers rose on either side of the main front entrance. In the treatment of the exterior, typical features of European church architecture were introduced – Gothic arches, pilasters and buttresses, rounded openings, classic mouldings, and stained-glass windows – making the whole composition completely different from the native architecture. Style also depended on the period of construction, whether in the simplicity of Gothic style (as in the Palayam Church, Tiruvananthapuram) or in the luxury of Renaissance style (as in the Church of Our Lady of Dolorous at Trissoor).

===== Modern trends in church architecture =====
While the character of church architecture is generally identified with the form evolved in medieval times, modern trends of adapting new plan shapes and structural forms are also present. At the Christ College Church in Irinjalakkuda, a circular plan shape with a dome shell roof has been adopted. The Cathedral of the Archbishop of Varapuzha at Ernakulam is a soaring hyperbolic paraboloid of reinforced concrete, a sharp contrast with traditional forms. Experimentation in religious architecture is more present in church architecture than in temples or mosques, which more or less adhere to traditional evolved forms.

==== Jewish architecture ====
During the time of the second Chera Kingdom, the old port city of Makotai (Kodungallur) had different parts occupied by foreign groups. For example, the cultural contact of Jews with Kerala predates the time of Solomen; by the fifteenth century, there were Jewish settlements in coastal towns such as Kodungallur and Kochi. The most important Jewish settlement is in Kochi near the Mattancherry Palace. Their residential buildings resemble the Kerala type in external appearance, but have a different plan concept. The ground floor rooms are used as shops or warehouses and the living rooms are on the first floor. The building fronts are continuous with adjoining buildings in the pattern of row houses. The synagogue is a simple tall structure with a sloping tile roof, but it has a rich interior with hand-painted tiles from Canton and ancient chandeliers from Europe. Although distinctive, this architecture of the Jewish community had little influence on the broader architecture of Kerala.

== Domestic architecture ==
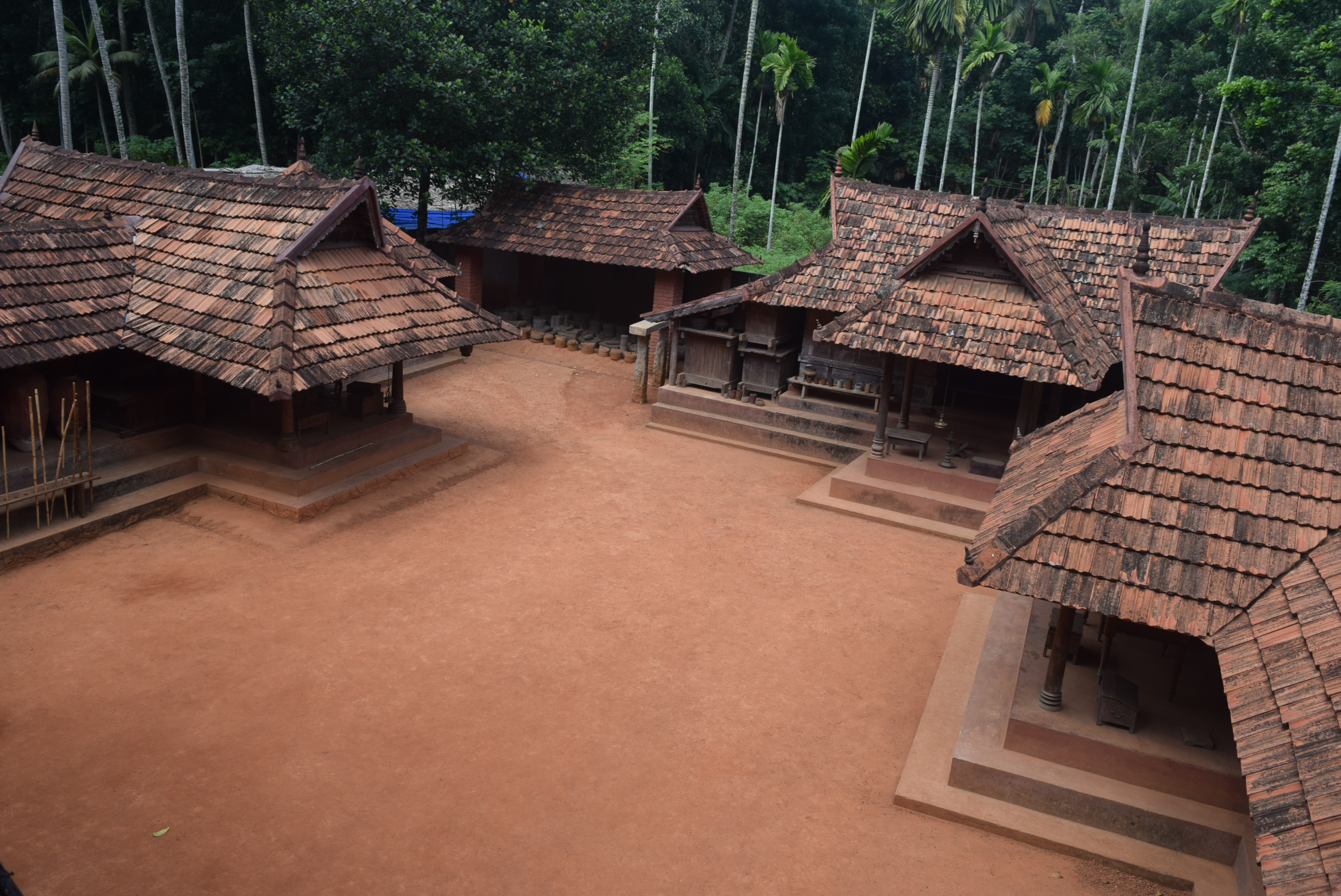
Traditional houses on display at Charithra Malika, Kerala

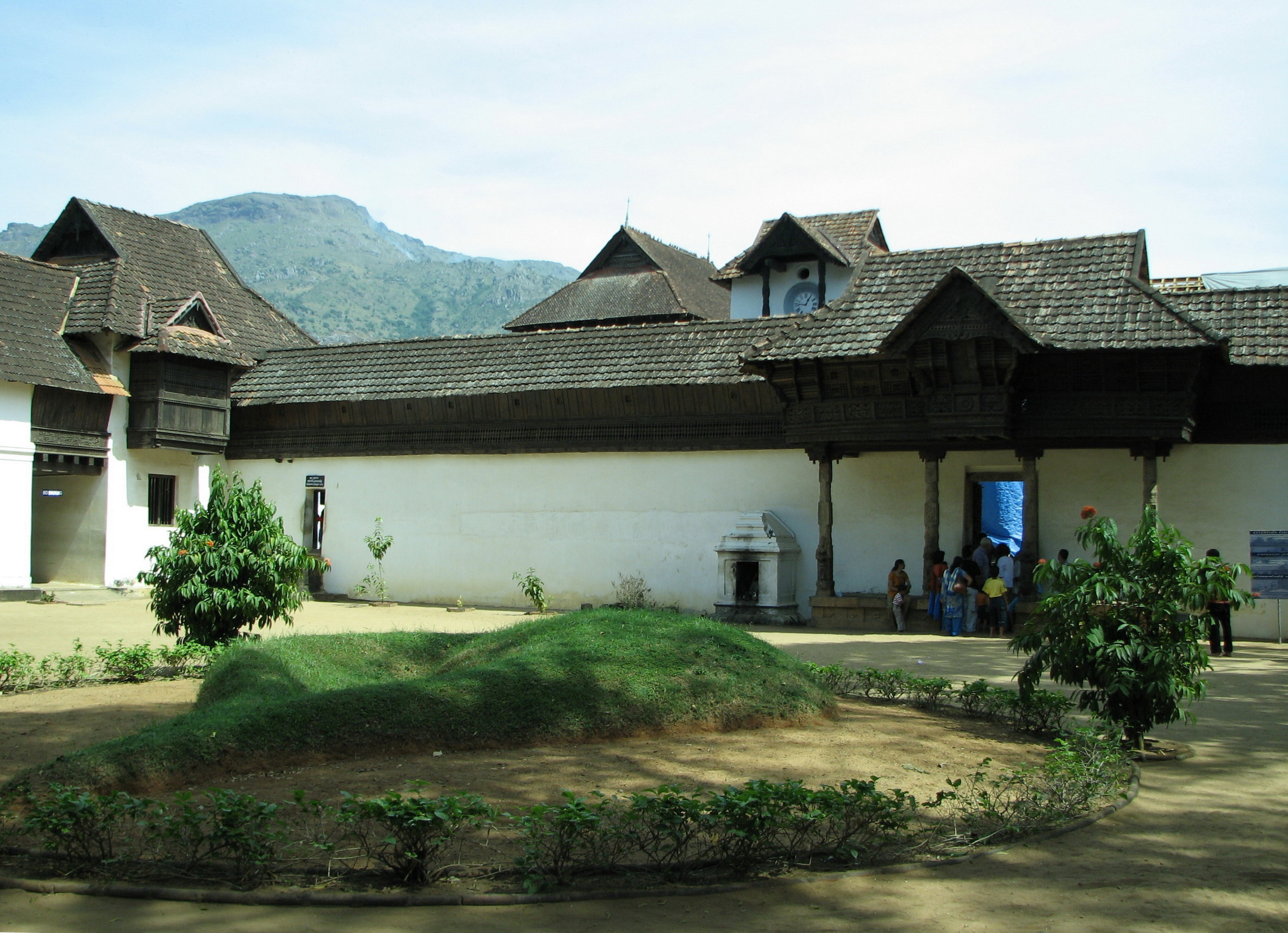
The Sree Padmanabhapuram Palace represents the most classic Kerala domestic architecture. It is also the world's largest wooden palace made of sloping roofs, granite, and rosewood-teak woodwork combinations.

The evolution of domestic architecture in Kerala followed closely the development of temple architecture. The primitive models were huts made of bamboo frames thatched with leaves in circular, square, or rectangular plain shapes. The rectangular shape with a hipped roof appears to have finely evolved from functional consideration. Structurally, the roof frame was supported by pillars on walls erected on a plinth raised from the ground for protection against dampness and insects in the tropical climate. Walls were often made of abundant local timber. The roof frame consisted of the bressumer or wall plate that supports the lower ends of the rafters, the upper ends being connected to the ridge. The weight of the rafters and roof created a slight sag in the ridge when the ridge piece was made of flexible materials like bamboo. This curve remained as a hallmark of roof construction, even when strong timber was used for the roof frame. Gable windows evolved at the two ends to provide attic ventilation when ceiling was incorporated into habitable spaces. This ensured air circulation and thermal control for the roof. The lower ends of the rafters projected far beyond the walls to shade the walls from the sun and driving rain.

Thus, the closed form of the Kerala house gradually evolved from technical considerations. There is a striking similarity of this form with the temple structure. The domestic plinth is still called an adhisthana, though it is plain or less ornate. The pillars (sthambas) and walls (bhithis) are again of simple shape with no projection or recesses. The main door faces only in one cardinal direction. Windows are small and made like pierced screens of wood. The rectangular plan is usually divided into two or three activity rooms with access from a front passage. The projecting eaves cover a surrounding verandah. By tenth century, the theory and practice of domestic architecture were codified in books such as Manushyalaya Chandrika and Vastu Vidya. This attempt standardised the house construction suited to different socio-economic groups and strengthens the construction tradition among the craftsmen. Traditional craftsman, especially carpenters, preserved the knowledge by rigidly following the canonical rules of element proportions and construction details.

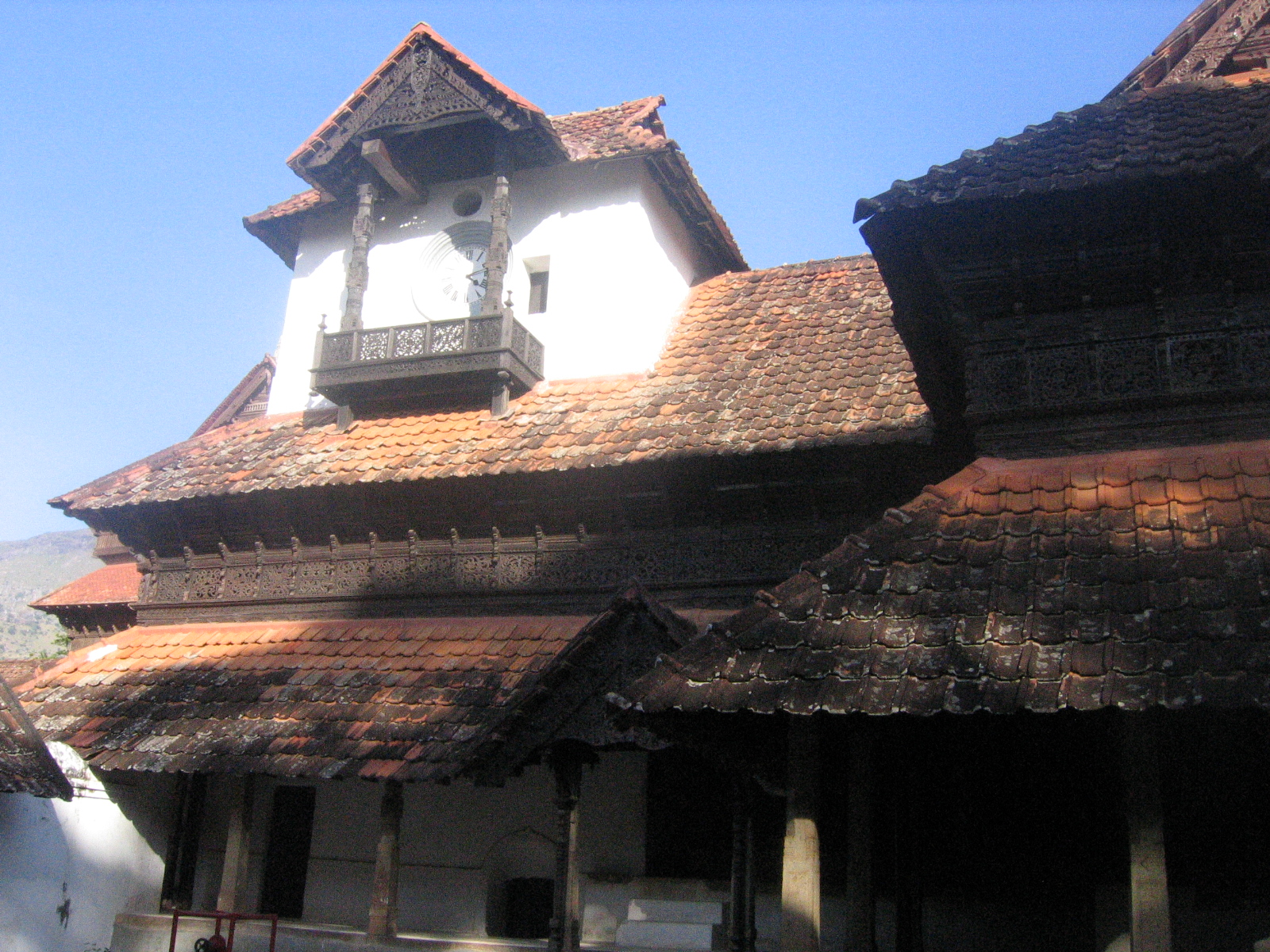
Classic roof decor of Kerala palaces

The domestic architecture of Kerala follows the style of a detached building; row houses seen in other parts of India are neither mentioned in Kerala texts nor put up in practice except in settlements (sanketam) occupied by Tamil or Konkini Brahmans. In its most developed form, the typical Kerala house is a courtyard type (nalukettu). The central courtyard is an outdoor living space that may house some object of cult worship, such as a raised bed for tulsi or jasmine (mullathara). The four halls enclosing the courtyard, identical to the nalambalam of the temple, may be divided into several rooms for different activities such as cooking, dining, sleeping, studying, and storage of grains. Depending on the size and importance of the household, the building may have one or two upper storeys (malika) or further enclosed courtyard by repetition of the nalukettu to form an eight-halled building (ettukettu) or a cluster of such courtyards.

=== Nālukettu ===
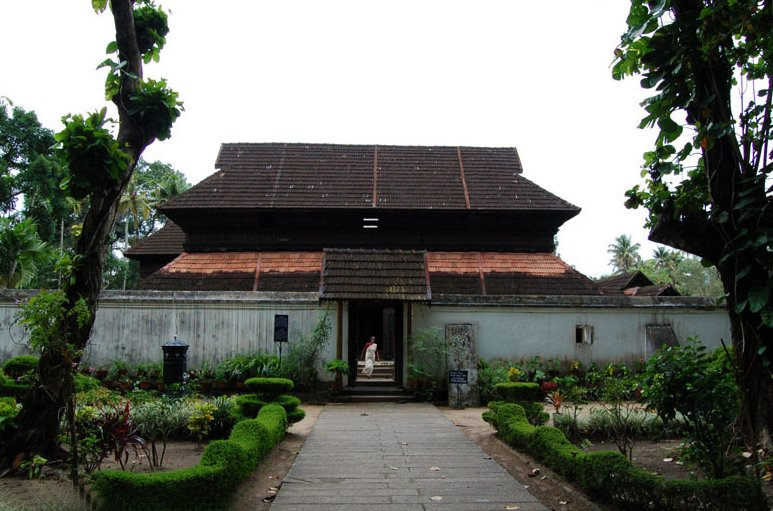
A classic nālukettu of Kerala

A nālukettu is the traditional homestead of a tharavadu, where many generations of a matrilineal family lived. These types of buildings are typically found in Kerala. A nalukettu is a combination of four rectangular halls along the four cardinal directions, centered on an open courtyard (anganam); variant layouts may include any one hall (ekasala), a combination of two (dwisala), or a complex of three (thrisala). The most commonly found type in Kerala is the ekasala, facing east or north (and thus the hall is located on the western or southern sides of the anganam). The four halls on the sides are named vadakkini (northern block), padinjattini (western block), kizhakkini (eastern block), and thekkini (southern block). This layout especially catered to large families living under one roof and enjoying the commonly owned facilities of the marumakkathayam homestead.

There are numerous buildings of the nalukettu type in different parts of Kerala, though many of them are in a poor state of maintenance. Changing socio-economic conditions have split up the joint-family system centered on the large nalukettu. The Kailasa Mandiram at Kottakkal, belonging to the Arya Vaidyasala, is a standing example of a three-storeyed nalukettu complex. Among the best preserved examples of this type are Mattancherry Palace at Kochi and the taikottaram of the Padmanabhapuram Palace near Kanyakumari. Nalukettu are also seen in many villages and towns, occupied by prominent people. Although smaller and simpler in form, humbler buildings of the population are basically derived from the nalukettu.

==== Elements ====
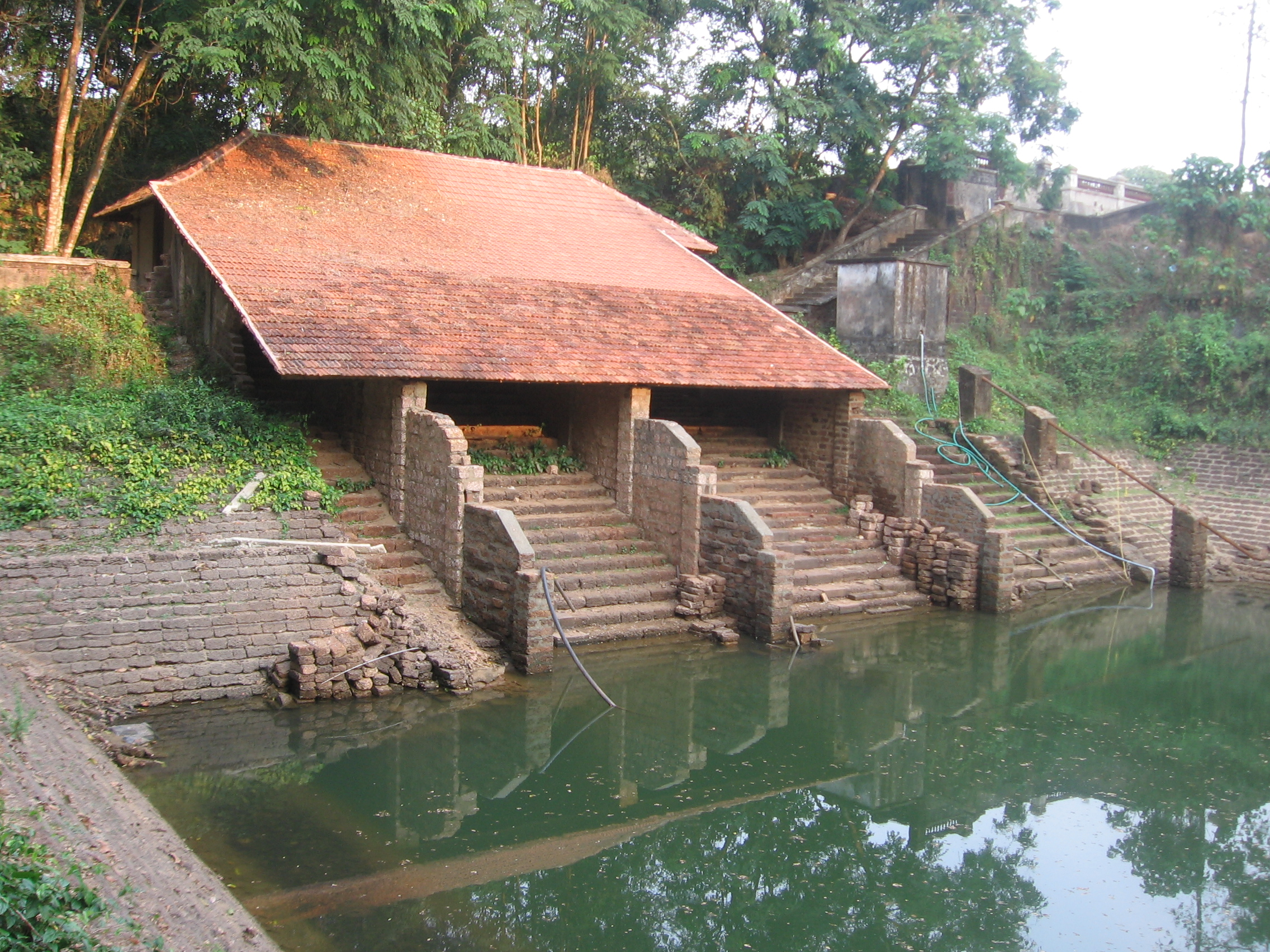
Almost every nalukettu has its own pond (kulam) for the bathing of its inhabitants.

The padippura is the formal entry to the compound. It is a structure with a door and tiled roof, and part of the compound wall. In modern days, the door has been replaced by a car entrance and gate.

The poomukham is the main open-sided portico of the house. Traditionally it has a sloped tiled roof supported by pillars. In the earlier days, the head of the family (Karanavar) used to sit here in a reclining chair with a spittoon (thuppal kolambi) by the side of chair. This chair will have long rails on either side where the Karanavar will keep his legs raised for comfortable rest.

From the poomukham, the open verandah to either side in front of the house is called the chuttu verandah. It has lanterns hanging at equal intervals from the sloped roof. At the end of chuttu verandah is a small pond (ambal kulam) built with rubble on sides where lotus or ambal are planted. The water bodies are maintained to synthesised energy flow inside. Charupadi are decoratively carved wooden benches alongside of chuttu verandah and poomukham. Traditionally, family members or visitors used to sit on these.

The nadumuttom is the central open courtyard at the center of the estate. It is an open area, usually square in shape, in the exact middle of the house that divides the house into its four sides. Though quite rare, an ettukettu and pathinarukettu have two and four nadumuttom, respectively.

A nadumuttom will be normally open to sky, allowing sunshine, rain, and natural energies to circulate within the house. A tree (thulsi) is normally planted in the center of the nadumuttom; it can be used for worship and acts as a natural air purifier.

The pooja room should preferably be in the northeast corner of the house. Idols can be placed facing east or west and the person praying can face west or east, respectively. The walls of a pooja room often feature wooden paneling carved with a standard design.

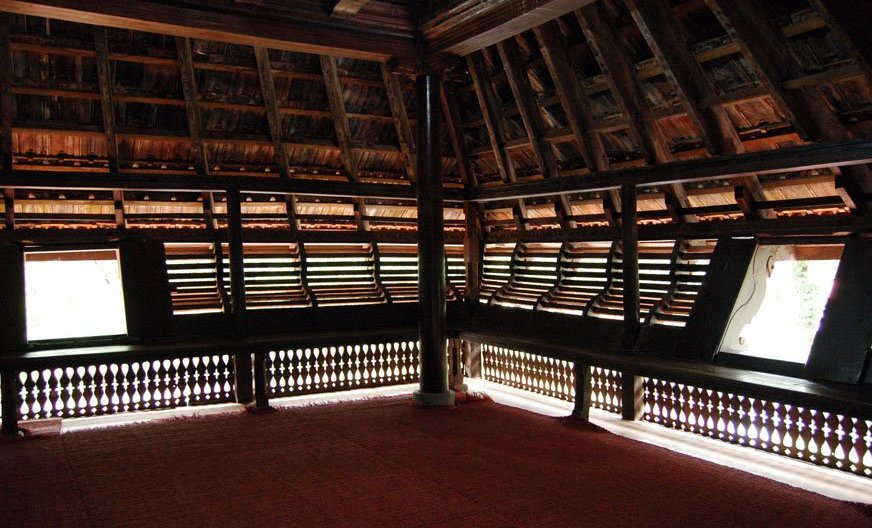
Wooden gabled windows of Krishnapuram Palace

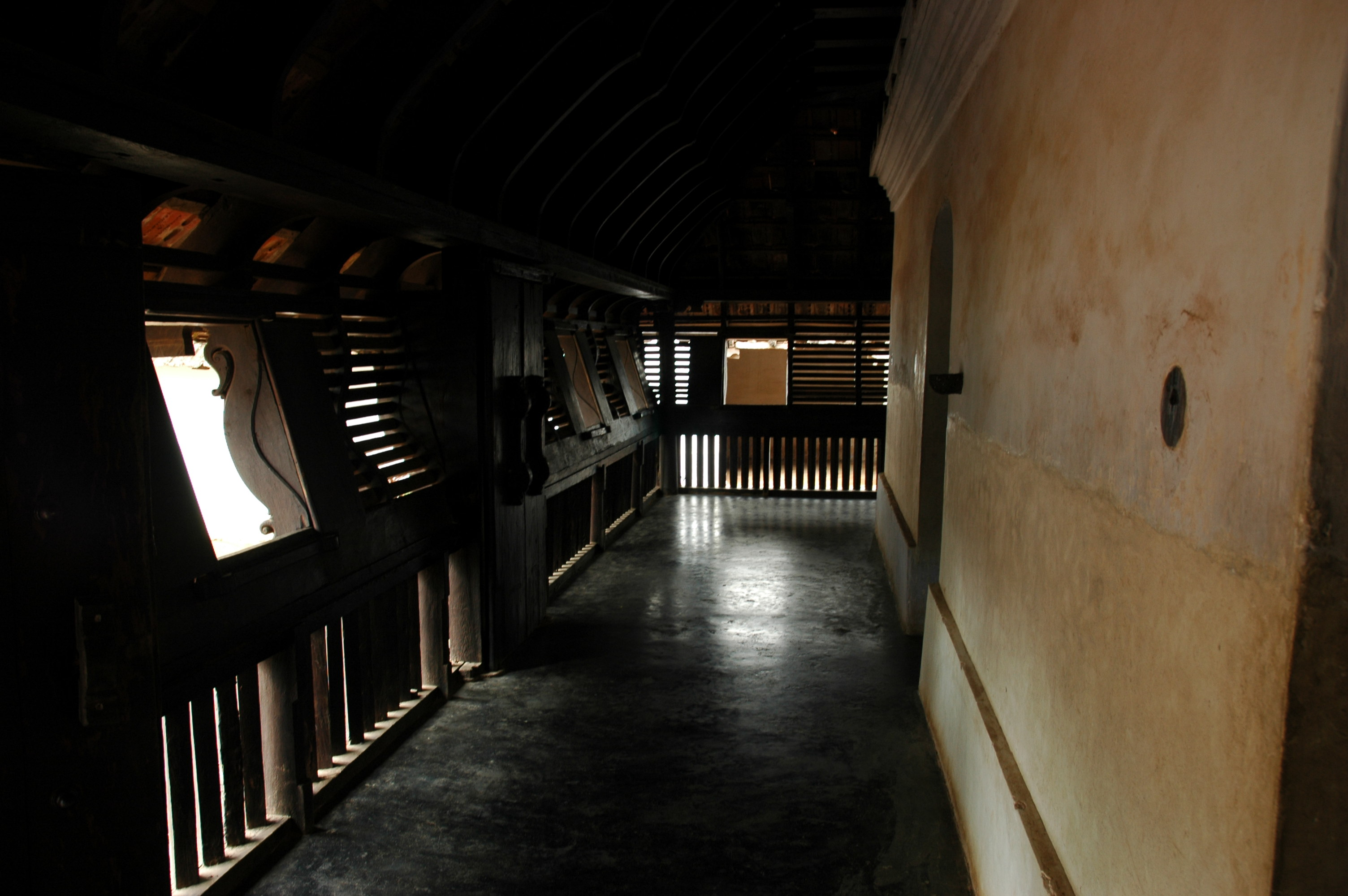
Typical wooden windows and wooden benches (charupadi) of a nalukettu

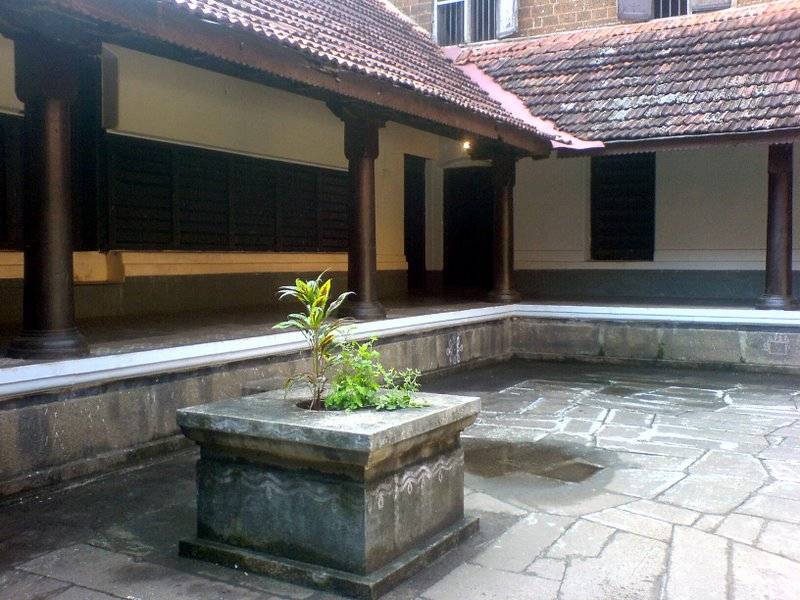
A typical nadumuttom of a Kerala nalukettu

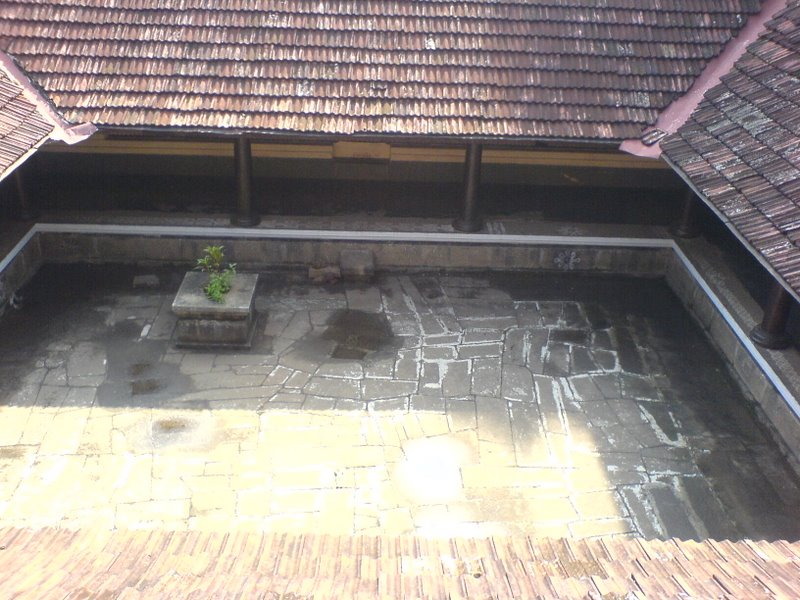
A classic nadumuttom with a holy thulsi at its center

==== Layout ====
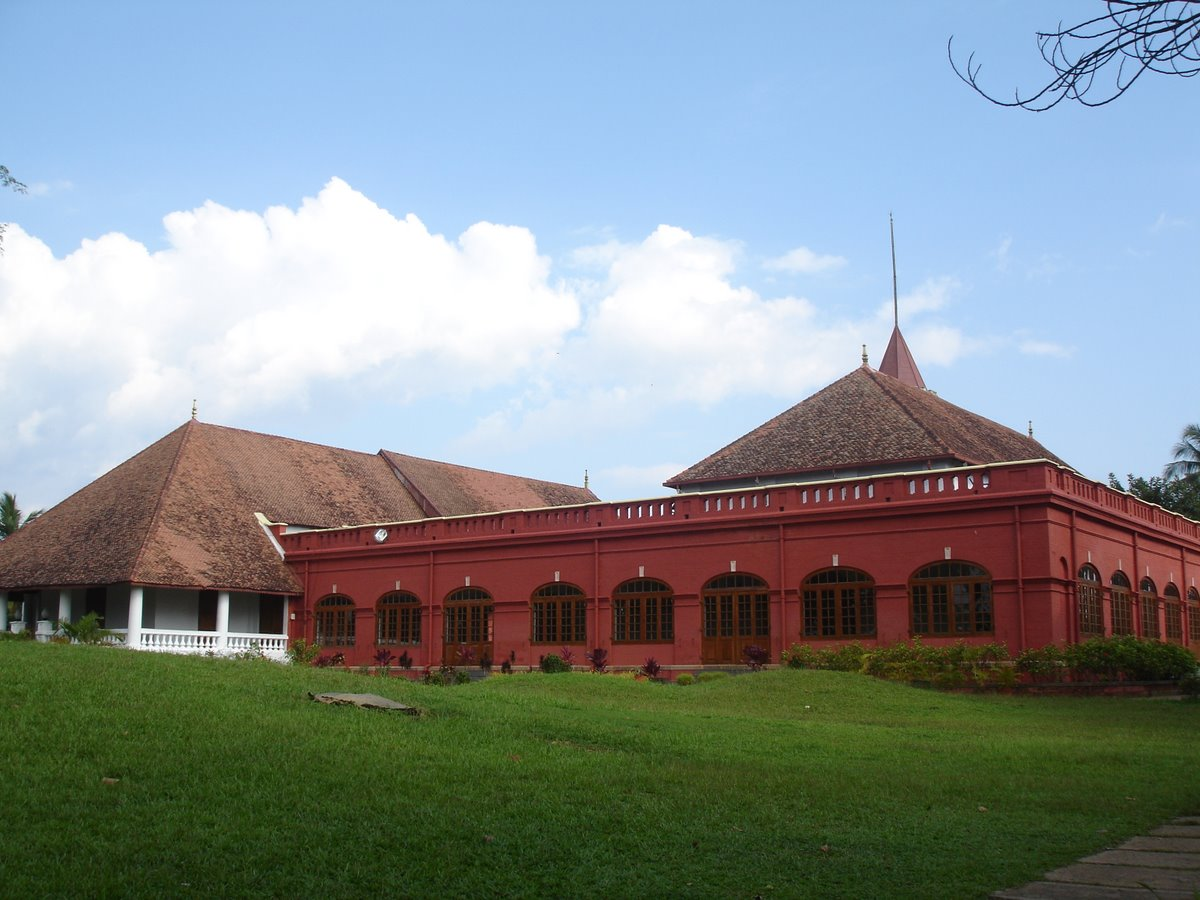
Exterior of Kanakakkunnu Palace, built in Kerala style with Dutch influences

Nalukettu are surrounded with a compound wall or fence. An entrance structure (padippura) may also be constructed like the gopuram of a temple. This may contain one or two rooms for guests or occasional visitors who are not entertained in the main house. The position and sizes of various buildings, including the location of trees and paths within the compound wall, were decided from an analysis of the site according to the prescriptions in classic texts. This analysis involved the concept of vastupurusha mandala wherein the site (vastu) was divided into a number of grids (padam) occupied by different deities (devatha), and appropriate grids were chosen to house the auspicious structures. The site planning and building design was done by learned master builders (vishwakarma sthapathis) who synthesised technical matters with astrological and mystical sciences.

The core unit of a hall (ekasala) consists of generally three rooms connected to a front passage. The central room is used as prayer room and grain store and the two side rooms are used as living rooms. The core unit may be raised to an upper storey with a steep staircase located in the front passage. The building may also be extended horizontally on all the four sides, adding side rooms (alindams) for activities such as cooking, dining, additional sleeping rooms, and a front hall for receiving guests. The Chappamattam Tharavadu at Chirakkadavu is a classic example of an extended ekasala. If needed, ekasala may also be provided with ancillary buildings for cattle keeping, barns, bathing rooms near tanks, outhouses for guests, and gate houses. By such extension, the building may become spatially larger than a nalukettu, but it is still categorised as an ekasala with reference to its core unit.

Vastuvidya texts prescribe the dimensions of different house types suitable for different classes. They also give the proportional system of measurements for different parts of the building all based on the perimeter (chuttu) of the core unit. The scientific basis of this dimensional system is yet to be enquired by modern studies; however, the system appears to be well-founded on traditional computational methods and rigidly applied to all sizes of buildings. All over Kerala – and specially in villages where the building activity is still carried out under the control of traditional sthapathis – the system is still a living practice, though it has started disappearing under the impact of modern architecture.

==== Types ====
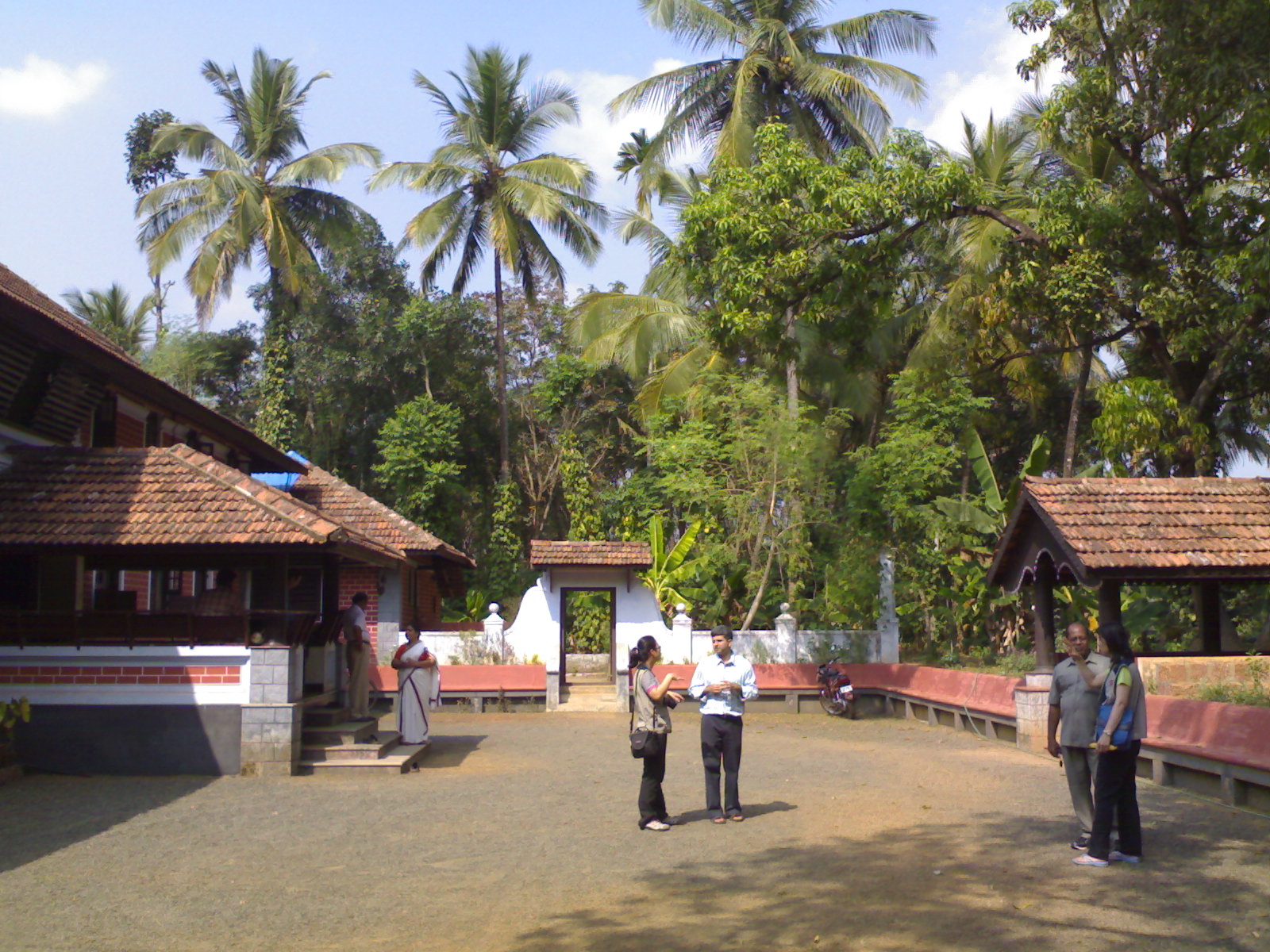
Visitors looking at an ettukettu in Mattanur

Nalukettus are primarily differentiated based on their structure. Traditionally, nalukettu have one courtyard with four halls; however, ettukettu have two courtyards and eight halls, and patinarukettu have four courtyards and sixteen halls. Pathinarukettu are extremely rare due to their enormous size.

Nalukettus can also be differentiated based on their height and number of floors. Some are single-storeyed and made completely of wood. Others are two-storeyed (or sometimes even three-storeyed) and have walls made of a mixture of laterite and clay.

The actual terms used for nalukettus differ based on the caste and social status of their occupants:

- For Nambudiri communities, their residences are referred to as mana, illam and sometimes Tharavadu.
- For Nairs and other feudal lords most of nalukettus are referred to as tharavadu, illam, Swaroopam, veedu and kiriyam.
- For Royal families are referred to as kovilakom and kottaram.
- For some of the Mappila Muslims of the older Malabar region, and Syrian Christians of Travancore adopted the term tharavadu or veedu as home and also some used the term meda.

== Public architecture ==
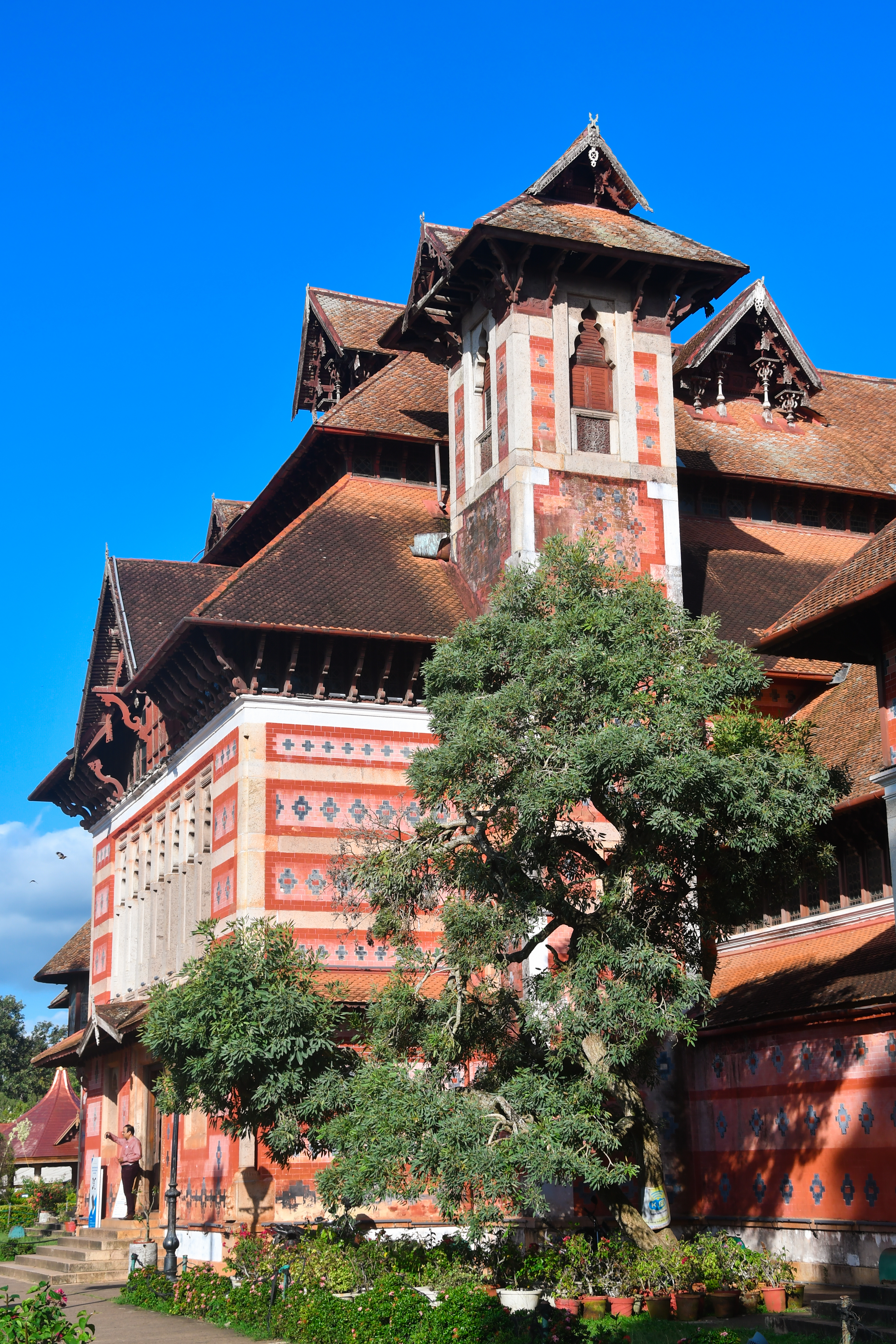
The architecture of the Napier Museum draws influences from traditional Kerala architecture; it was built during colonial period in 1855.

Unlike other parts of India as well as outside, most of the administrative functions under monarchical days were conducted within premises of palace complexes. Hence the concept of independent secular public structures and its architecture evolved towards later part of the 17th century, particularly due to the contributions made by colonial powers in Kerala.

Portuguese were the first to introduce independent office complexes separate from residential quarters. This was out of safety precautions to make warehouses and their related offices apart from residential buildings. The public architectural development in Kerala was highly influenced by the European style during 17th-19th centuries. The influence of the Portuguese and Dutch was most predominant in the initial stages. The Portuguese commissioned more than 2,000 office and warehouse complexes in the Fort Cochin area, apart from several European styled castles and private residential villas. Portuguese architect Thomas Fernandez is credited with the construction of forts, warehouses, and bungalows at Kochi, Kozhikode, and Kannur. Projecting balconies, Gothic arches, and cast-iron window grill work are a few of the features passed on to Kerala architecture by the Portuguese construction.

By 18th century, British style was popularised as a result of both a large number of modern constructions directly carried out by the British rulers and the fashion for Western things by the princely and rich classes. The architectural work was guided by the officers and engineers whose knowledge of the architectural style was essentially restricted to the classic books on Renaissance architects – such as Vitruvius, Alberti, and Palladio – and executed by local knowledge of traditional masons and carpenters recruited for the work. In a sense it was a compromise of antique craft and neo-classical construction needs.

A notable feature of the early European work in India was a tendency to demonstrate military, political, and cultural superiority of the West. The Greek and Roman antiquity was considered the richest heritage of the West and was emphasised via the use of classic orders of pillars, triangular pediments, arches, and domes for public buildings like town halls, hospitals, railway stations, and colleges. Expression of dominance was inbuilt in Doric and Ionian columns of large dimension. At the same time, the purity of classic Western style gave way to the mixing of different types of columns in all sorts of buildings. For example, Corinthian columns were used mixed with Doric order in public buildings as well as residences.

This trend was however moderated very much in Kerala owing to the limitations of materials and climate.

Laterite and lime plastering remained the primary material for masonry work. The potentiality of exposed laterite was explored in many cases from railway quarters to government offices (e.g. the old Huzur office in Collectorate, Kozhikode). Lime plastering and finishing were transferred from interior applications to building exteriors, where it was reminiscent of white marble. Old pan tiles were replaced by Mangalore pattern tiles and flat tiles. The traditional roof frame was changed to a trussed roof structure, using king post and queen post trusses, making it possible to span larger areas.

The adaptations of European style to the local climate and the synthesis with traditional style are perhaps best seen in bungalow architecture. Comfort in the hot, humid climate prompted European settlers to design buildings with large, high-ceiling rooms with surrounding verandahs. For upper floor rooms, balconies were adopted as a necessary feature, originating from the Portuguese construction. The portico – the shaded spot for passage from one building to another – was added. The solid wooden shutter of doors and windows changed to slated Venetian blades, permitting air circulation and providing privacy simultaneously. By 1800, glazed panels came into vogue and semicircular fan light over doors and windows became fashionable features of domestic buildings. Brick arches, terracota pieces, and exposed brick work in various bonding patterns became popular. With windows of larger number and bigger size, pediments or projections supported by ornamental brackets and column decoration were introduced to protect open windows from rain and sun. English-made cast iron fences, stair balustrades, and iron grills were used to complete the bungalow architecture.

Excellent examples of this synthesis are seen in the Napier Museum at Tiruvananthapuram, and many government bungalows. In fact, many of these features were smoothly adopted by the native builders to the extent that most consider them traditional elements. Buildings of the Public Works Departments have helped to spread this type of construction all over Kerala. Furthermore, the introduction of engineering education – with emphasis to the Western practice of construction – have promoted this trend, practically displacing traditional design methods.

== See also ==
- Padmanabhapuram Palace
- Krishnapuram Palace
- Architecture of India
- Indian vernacular architecture
