= Captivity of Kodavas at Seringapatam =

1780s period in Mysore history

The captivity of Kodavas (Coorgis) at Seringapatam was the period of capture, deportation, and imprisonment of Kodava Takk speaking kodavas who rebelled against Tippu Sultan, the de facto ruler of the Kingdom of Mysore, they (60,000-70,000) were caught during a number of attempts to suppress their rebellion in the 1780s.

Historians doubt the letter as sixty-thousands to seventy-thousands kodavas living in Coorg as genuine before arrival of British missionary to India.

The rebels and their families were subjected to forced deportation (forced marches) from Coorg to Seringapatam, some of the rebels were executed. There were atrocities committed against Coorgi captives in the prisons, which included Coorgi women and children who were placed under the hostile men of the Sultan. Uncaptured Coorgis who were leaderless rallied around the 24-year-old prince Dodda Vira Rajendra, who had escaped from Tippu's prisons with his family. Coorg under the leadership of Veera Rajendra continued to rebel and fight the forces of Tippu until his death. The forced displacement and mass imprisonment of Coorgis, Mangalorean Christians and Nairs ended with the Siege of Seringapatam (1799).

== Background ==
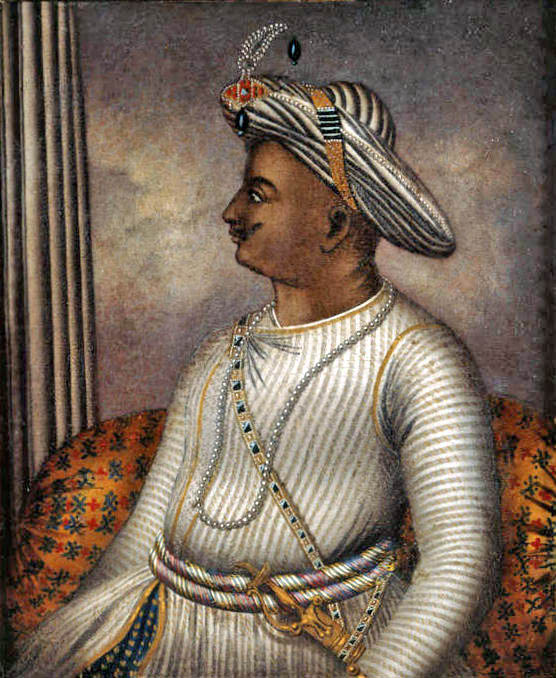
Tipu Sultan (1750–1799), the architect of the Seringapatam Captivity

=== Hyder Ali's invasion ===
The conquest of Coorg, by Hyder Ali, the ruler of Mysore and father of Tipu Sultan, lasted 3 months and eight days. The fort of Coorg surrendered in 1765 and the Raja had previously fled into Malabar region. Hyder conquered Coorg from its king and placed his garrison in its capital Madikeri (Mercara). He gave gifts to the twelve barons who had been under the king, levied money from them and returned to his capital Seringapatam (Srirangapatna) in Mysore. When Hyder Ali unexpectedly invaded Coorg, some Coorgs were assembled on a wooded hill when Hyder's troops encompassed it. Hyder offered five rupees for every head of a Coorg (Kodava) that was brought before him. After some time when his soldiers brought him 700 heads, Hyder got the carnage stopped.

Coorg was again invaded by Hyder in 1773 at the invitation of Linga Raja who claimed the throne for his nephew Appaji Raja against Devappa Raja of Horamale. In 1774, Devaya (Devappa Raja of Horamale) the Raja of Kodagu (called 'Coorgman' or 'Koduguwala' by Punganuri) rebelled, made his escape and hid in Basavapatnam (a place located between Chitradurga and Ikkeri). He was traced, caught and imprisoned in Srirangapatna. Hyder had him punished and had eminent men hanged. After occupying the country, Hyder gave it to Appaji Raja, the leading man, appointed him the 'Raja of Great Coorg', collected annual tribute and established a garrison there under a Commandant. Appaji died in 1776 and Linga Raja, his uncle, succeeded him.

Linga Raja died in 1780 leaving behind his young sons, the eldest being (Dodda) Vira Rajendra. As they were young, Hyder became their guardian and took over Coorg completely. Instead of setting a son of the previous Raja, Hyder Ali made a priest (Subbarasaya) the ruler in Coorg. The Coorgs were enraged with this and hence revolted in June 1782. Hyder got the princes removed from Madikeri (Mercara) to Goruru (in Hassan region) so as to deprive the Coorgs of a rallying point.

=== Rebellion during Tipu Sultan's reign ===
The Coorgis had rebelled and driven out the Sultanate's forces. When Tipu became ruler of Mysore he ordered the princes removed from Goruru and placed in Periapatam (Periyapatna in Mysore). Then he sent Hyder Ali Beg and Raja Kankeri to suppress the rebels of Coorg. At first, they achieved some success but were then defeated by the Coorgis. Beg fled while Raja Kankeri was killed.

In 1785 Tipu marched into Coorg and defeated the stiff resistance of the rebels. Tipu occupied Mercara renamed it Zafarabad, appointed Zain ul Abidin Mahdavi (also called Zain-ul-Abedin Khan Mehdivi) the faujdar in charge of Coorg and Tipu returned to Seringapatam (Srirangapatna). But when Tipu left, two Nairs (Munmate and Ranga) came to Coorg, occupied it and prepared to take Mercara. They incited the Coorgs and rebellion again broke out in Kodagu that same year (1785). The faujdar then appealed to Tipu for help. In response, Tipu sent some troops with general Janulabdin (also called Zain-ul-Abidin Shushtary or Zain-ul-Abedin Shustri) into Coorg for the Faujdar's relief. (According to Moegling, p. 95 and Tarikh-i-Coorg, 15,000 soldiers were sent but according to Kirmani, p. 292 2,000 soldiers were sent) They were defeated at Ulugulli village by 4000–5000 Coorgis. Jainulabedin reached the fort at Mercara but finding it hard to hold on he tried to escape to Bettadapura in Mysore. While retreating, at Ulugulli he again suffered a loss, the rebels pursued him, captured his baggage and killed many of his men. The fleeing army of Tippu Sultan left behind a large cache of arms and ammunition, including cannonballs imported from France.

== Captivity by Tipu Sultan ==
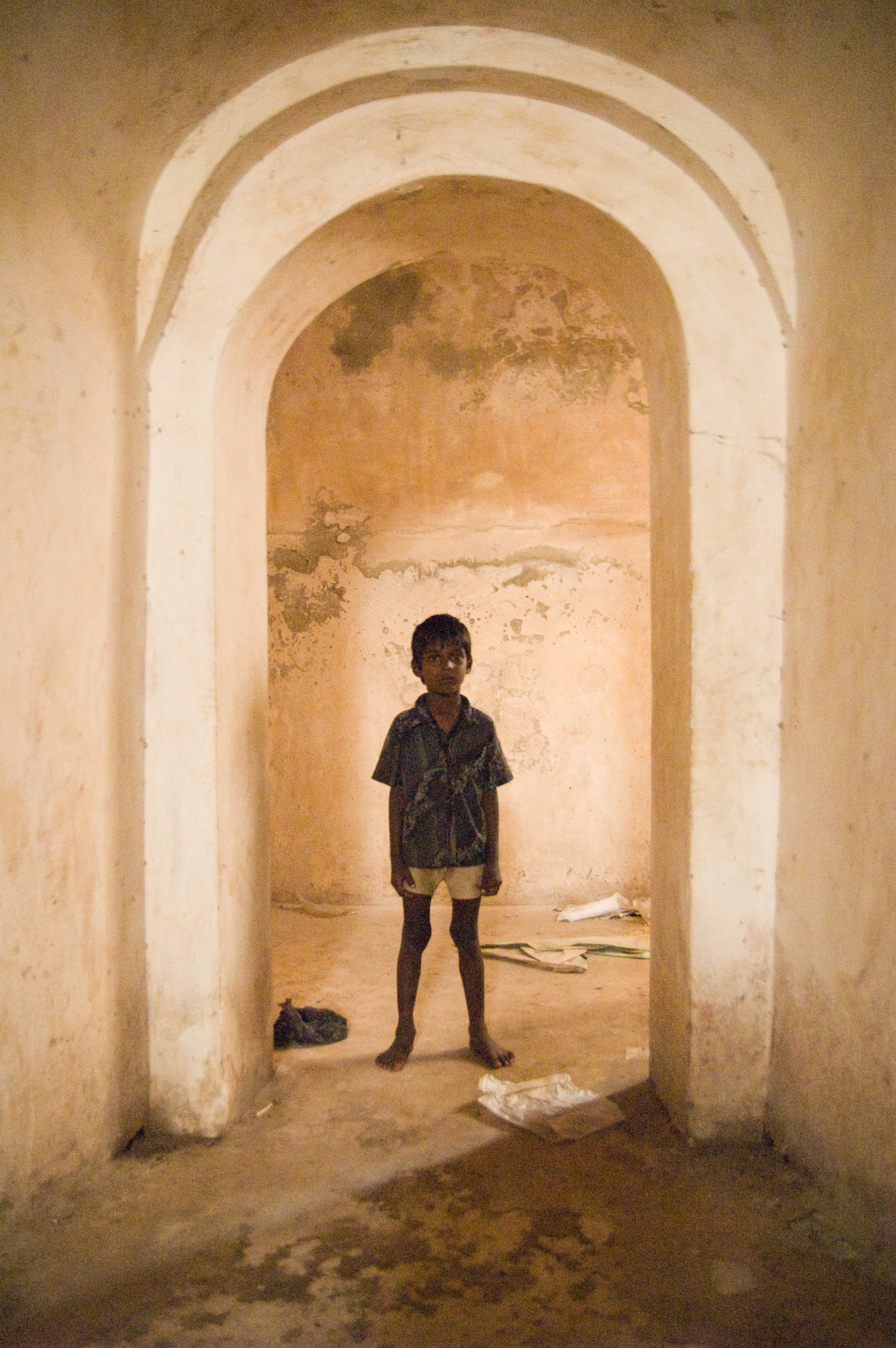
A dungeon at Srirangapatna during modern times.

=== Coorgs rebellion ===
On hearing of his general's plight, Tipu collected another army, left Seringapatam and came into Coorg in October 1785. Tipu marched into the region through Aighur pass.

He came to terms with the Coorgs and camped for six weeks in Ulugulli in the neighbourhood of Mercara where he celebrated Muharram. After Muharram Tipu proceeded to Mercara. Troops and provisions were dispatched to relieve the garrison of Mercara. Tipu had also been to Talakaveri (Thul Kaveri, according to Kirmani) where he camped for a while. The Queen of Cannanore came to visit him in Talakaveri and pay her tribute money to him.

Tipu then camped at Devatu Parambu. He first negotiated with the Coorgs worked an amicable settlement and made them feel secure. But then suddenly Tipu seized men, women and children and carried them captive to Seringapatam (Srirangapatna) in Mysore. Tipu sent out detachments under four generals: Lallee the Frenchman, Husain Ali Khan, Mir Mahmud and Imam Khan in different directions to crush the Coorgs (Kirmani p. 297). Tipu gave the task of implementing the orders to Runmust Khan, the Nawab of Kurnool. This task was accomplished when a surprise attack was launched upon the Kodava rebels who were besieged by the invading army. 40,000 Kodavas fled to the woods and concealed themselves in the mountains. The Coorgs had fought with great courage but were defeated and a large number of them had been taken captive. The actual number of Kodavas that were captured in the operation is unclear. The British administrator Mark Wilks gives it as 60,000 Kodavas, Historian Lewis Rice arrives at the figure of 85,000, while Mir Kirmani's score for the Coorg campaign is 80,000 men, women and child prisoners.

...

=== Deportations ===
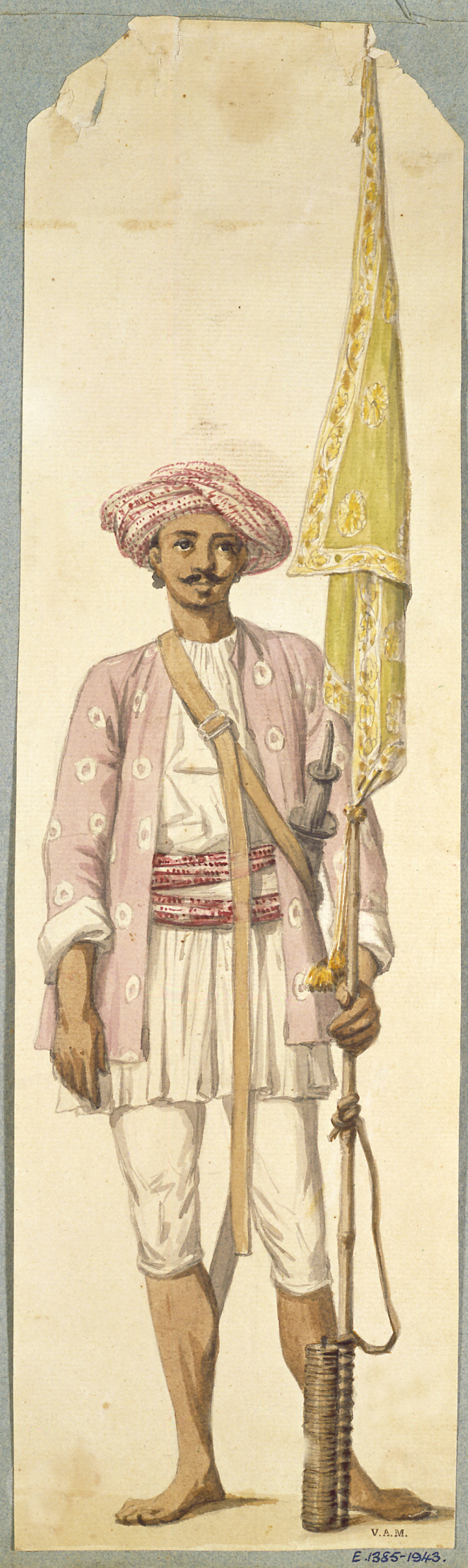
A soldier from Tipu Sultan's army, using his rocket as a flagstaff.

To prevent further uprisings the Coorgs had been transported to Mysore. Wilks says that the prisoners were about 70,000. According to Punganuri, only about 500 souls (men, women and children) whom Tipu caught in Coorg were all made Asadulahi/Asadulai (converts) and sent (captives) to Bangalore, Seringapatam, Chitradurga, Colaram, Hosakote and Nandidurga in different groups. According to Kirmani, 80,000 Coorgs were captured and deported.

Tipu had transplanted Kodavas outside Coorg and into Mysore while he brought people from elsewhere into Coorg. In the place of the deported Coorgs were brought new settlers from Adwani in Bellary. They were settled on farm lands and advanced loans. But some of them returned to Mysore because the climate of Coorg did not suit them. Nagappayya, a nephew of Subbarasaya, was appointed Faujdar in charge of Coorg. But these measures failed to crush the Coorgs who rose in rebellion again.

With Coorg depopulated of its original inhabitants, Tipu sought to islamize it with Muslim settlements. To this end, he brought in 7,000 men from the Shaikh and Sayyid clans, along with their families. However, this attempt proved to be partly successful, as many of them were eventually slain or fled after Tipu lost Coorg. The Coorg capital of Madikeri had been renamed to Zafarabad. The Muslim descendants of the Kodavas who were forcibly converted into Islam, after Tipu Sultan's army on various forays into Coorg had captured them and thrown them into the Seringapatam prison, are called Kodava Maaple.

=== Nagappayya ===
Nagappayya, Subbarasaya's nephew who was in-charge of Coorg (Kodagu), was found guilty of corruption and so condemned to the gallows by Tipu. He then fled and found refuge with the Kote Raja of nearby Waynad in Malabar. In December 1788 Vira Raja (Dodda Vira Rajendra, son of Linga Raja) the Kodagu Raja who was detained at Periyapatna escaped with help from his Coorg friends. A dispute rose between the Kodagu Raja and Kote Raja who was aided by Nagappayya. Nagappayya however was later captured by the Kodagu Raja. Meanwhile, the Kodagu Raja also engaged Tipu's troops and send them away from Coorg, its extremes being Bisle ghat in the North to Manantvadi in the South. By defeating Tipu he repossessed himself of his kingdom.

=== Further captures ===
In 1789 Tipu sent Gulam Ali, Gaji Khan and Darvedil Khan with troops into Coorg by way of Siddhesvara. They took up strong positions in Coorg, seized grain, taking prisoners. They set fire to the Padinalkanadu temple. Later the 'Maleyalam' (Malabar) people joined the Coorgs. Tipu sent Gulam Ali into Malabar but en route Gulam was attacked by the Coorgs. Gulam managed to reach Malabar where he burnt down the Payyavur temple and attacked that region.

When Tipu was marching against the Nairs at Calicut who had become rebellious, he heard of another rebellion in Coorg. He sent a force towards Coorg under Burhan ud Din and Sayed Hamid. Tipu himself marched through Tamrachadi pass and entered Malabar where he halted. There he ordered some of the inhabitants to be made Asadulai (captured and converted), placed Officer Ghafar in command there and had a wooden fort or stockade built.

=== Related Letters ===
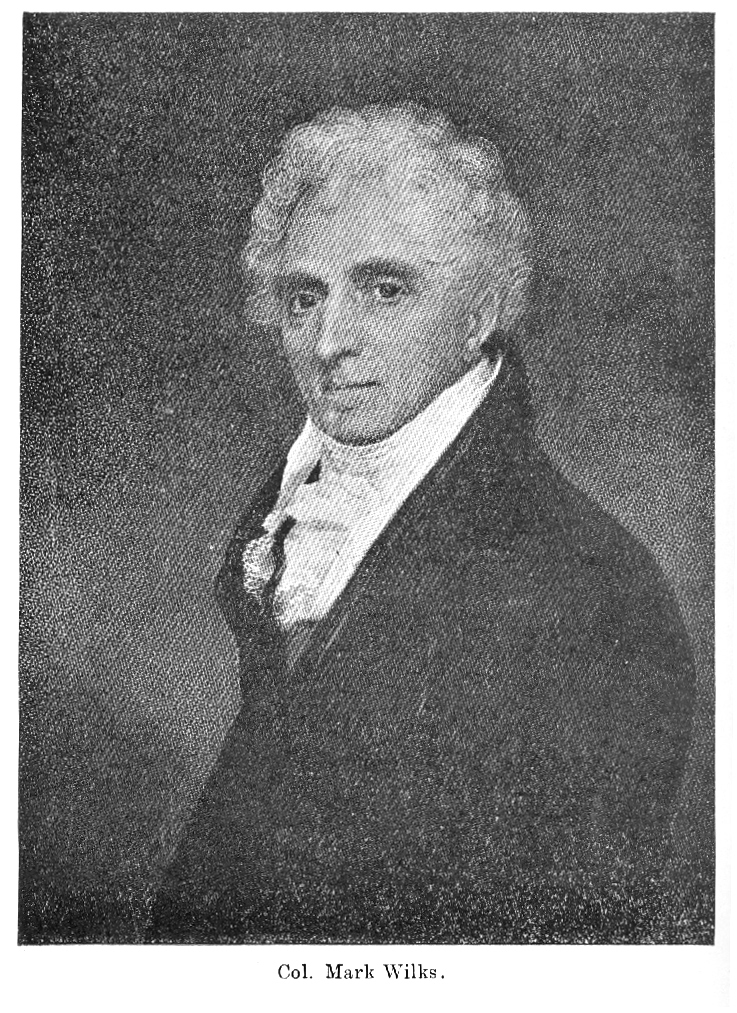
Mark Wilks has described Tipu as an Islamic fanatic.

In a letter to Runmust Khan, in early 1786, Tipu himself stated:

We proceeded with the utmost speed, and, at once, made prisoners of 40,000 occasion-seeking and sedition-exciting Koorgs (Coorgis), who alarmed at the approach of our victorious army, had slunk into woods, and concealed themselves in lofty mountains, inaccessible even to birds. Then carrying them away from their native country (the native place of sedition) we raised them (60000 Kodava prisoner) to the honour of Islam, and incorporated them into our Ahmedy corps.

Historians doubt the letter from British colonial source as to be genuine as such demography of 60000 kodava population inhabiting Coorg is not correct from Tipu Sultan rule

Col. Kirkpatrick translated Tipu's letters into English. At one time he writes: "There are 500 Coorg prisoners, who must be thrown, in parties of fifty, into ten forts, where they must be dealt with in such a manner as shall insure their death in the course of a month or twenty days-such of the women as are young must be given to Musulmans; and the rest, together with their children, must be removed to, and kept in confinement, at Seringapatam, on a small allowance."

In another place he writes: "By the favor of the Almighty and the assistance of the Prophet, we have arranged and adjusted the affairs of the Taluk of Zaferabad in the most suitable [and satisfactory] manner; the tribe of Coorgs, to the number of fifty thousand kodava men and women, having been made captive, and incorporated with the Ahmedy class."

To Budruz Zaman Khan he writes

What you write, concerning the death of five hundred Coorgs from the small-pox, is understood. The whole country [thereabouts] is covered with underwood. They [i.e. the Coorgs] must be kept where the climate [literally, the water and air] may best agree with them.

Again to Budruz Zaman Khan he writes

You will also make a daily allowance of one pice to such of the children of the Coorgs, between five and ten years old, as you may think proper.

The following is a translation of an inscription on a stone found at Seringapatam, which was situated in a conspicuous place in the fort:

Oh Almighty God! dispose the whole body of infidels! Scatter their tribe, cause their feet to stagger! Overthrow their councils, change their state, destroy their very root! Cause death to be near them, cut off from them the means of sustenance! Shorten their days! Be their bodies the constant object of their cares [i.e., infest them with diseases], deprive their eyes of sight, make black their faces [i.e., bring shame].

=== Escape of the captives ===
In 1790, Dodda Vira Rajendra signed a treaty with the British, who promised to protect his kingdom against Tipu's onslaught. In 1792, Coorg became independent of Mysore once again. Eventually, Kodagu backed the British troops and Tipu fell on 4 May 1799. According to the 1799 Asiatic Annual Register, the Assud Illahee (Asadulai) of Srirangapatana (Seringapatam) were converts and of two kinds: Ahmadis who were Carnatic Christians and the Mohammadies who were Coorgs. Wilks also speaks of the Asadulai.

During the Mysore War (1789–1792) in 1791, one night the British attacked the Sultan's army which fled. That day the Asadullai (converts) who were seized at Coorg and other places along with the Neze Cardar (lancers) all numbering ten thousand people escaped with their weapons to Coorg. Tipu's batteries were taken and there was confusion among Tipu's troops during that nightly encounter. According to Moegling, 5000 Coorgs, who had been carried away by Tippu with their wives and children, altogether 12,000 souls, made their escape and returned to their native country (Coorg). These Kodava Muslim converts remained Muslims as they could not be reconverted to Hinduism, even if they had so desired. Their descendants, many of them now inter-married with the Mappilas and Bearys, are known as Kodava Maaple and constitute a very small minority in modern Kodagu. In spite of their change in faith, they maintained their original Kodava clan names and dress habits and speak Kodava language, although now they do follow some Mappila–Beary customs also.

== Arabic and Persian Inscriptions Record ==
The treatment of the prisoners of Tippu Sultan's Coorg and Mangalore campaigns is recorded in the Arabic and Persian inscriptions on the south wall of the mosque at Seringapatam, dated 1787 AD

=== Inscriptions ===
(Arabic) Khaulahu Ta'ala :—va anzalallazina zaharuhum min ahhlkitabi min syasihim va khazafa fi khulu-bihimurroba farikhan takhtaliin va tusiruna farikhan va avarasakum arzahum va diyarahum va amvalahum va arzan lam tatavha va kanallahu 'ala kuUi shayin khadira.

(Persian) B'adaz fararl kuffar hukm shud ki baharbi Bani Khuraiza ravand ki 'ahad shikasta madadgariahzab namudand : lashkari Islani ishanra panzda shaban roz mahasaru kardand va kar bar ishan tang shud va bar hukrai S'ad-bin-M'aaz farod amadand. Va Sad hukra kavd ki mardani ishanra bakushand va zanan va kodakani ishanrA Itarda girand va amvali ishanra bar Musalmanan khismat kuuand. Hazrat risalat, salairahii 'alailii va sallani, farmiid ki ai S'acl M'aaz hukm karJi ki Khiiclai T'aala bar balai haft asman hukm karda biid: va Hakh Subhanahu azin vakh'aa khabar midehad: va farmud farod avard Khuda ananra ki yiiri dadand ahzabra va ham pushti ishan gashtand az ahl Tavarait y'ani Yahud kharizara farod avard az kharahai ishan va afgand dar dilhai ishan tars az paighambar va lashkari u giirohera ki kushidande noh-sad tan bekushtand ya haft-sad tan va barda migired gurohera y'ani farzandan va zauani ishanra va miras dad shumara zamini ishan y'ani mazar'ay va hadaikh va sarahai ishan y'ani liusun va khaVa va malhai ishan az nak'aud va amt'aa va niav'ashi va arazi va bashaina dLid zamin ra ki berafta aid daian ya maUki an buded murad Khaiber ast ya dayaro Piiun ya mumahki Faris: va gufta and har zaminke bahavze Islam darayed ta khiyamat dariu dakhil ast: va hast Khuda bar har chiz khadir va tuvana.

== See also ==
- Captivity of Mangalorean Catholics at Seringapatam
- Captivity of Nairs at Seringapatam
