= Malabar Muslims =

Malabar Muslims of Kerala and Lakshadweep
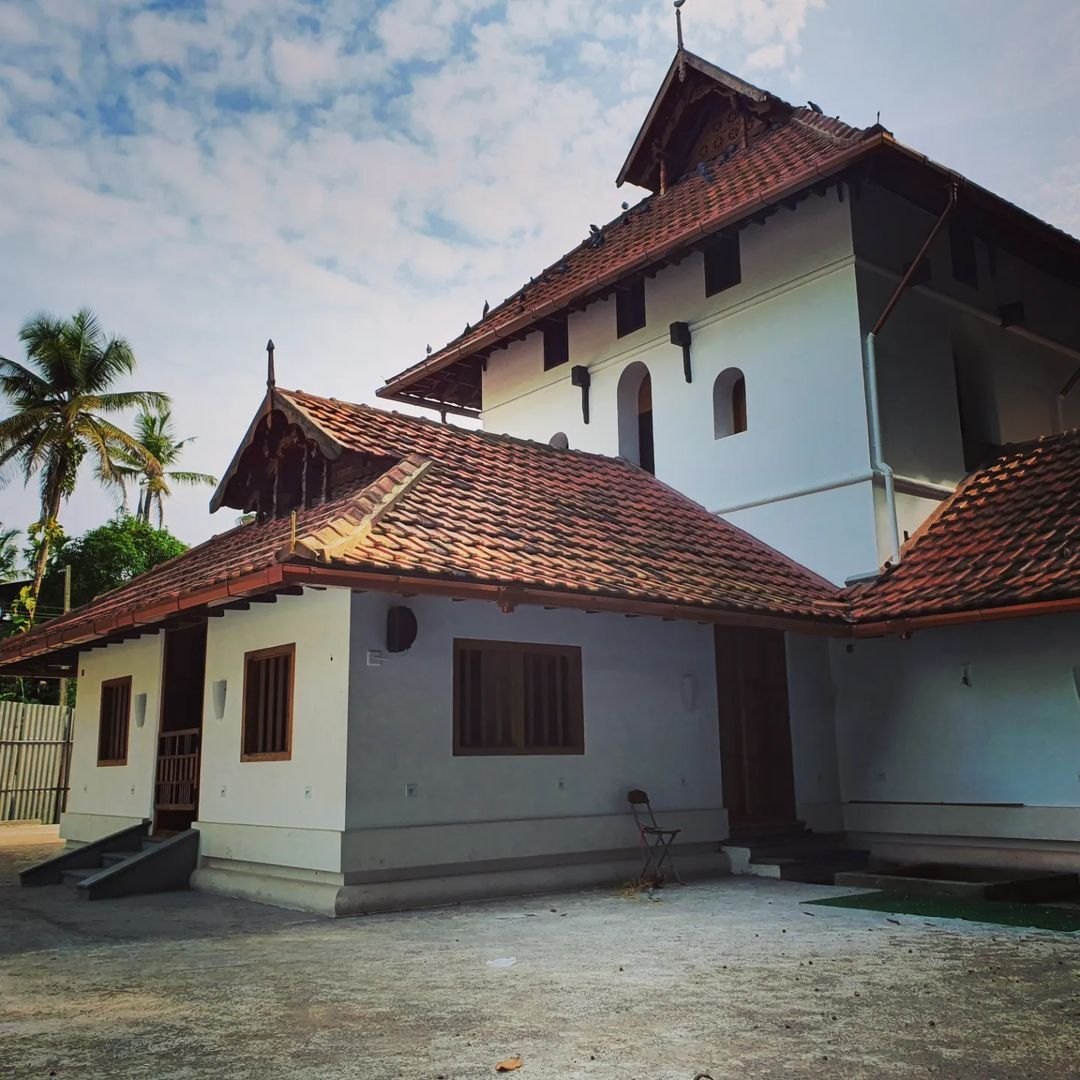
- Cheraman Juma Masjid, the first mosque built by Malabar Muslims

Total population
- c. 6 million (2011)

Regions with significant populations
- Kerala, Lakshadweep, Tulu Nadu, Kodagu, States of Persian Gulf

Languages
- Malayalam (Arabi Malayalam)

Religion
- Sunni Islam

Related ethnic groups
- Beary, Kodava Maaple, Malayalis, Marakkars, Sri Lankan Moors, Hadharem

Malabar Muslims or Muslim Mappilas are members of the Muslim community found predominantly in Kerala state and the Lakshadweep islands in Southern India. The term Mappila (Ma-Pilla) is used to describe Malabar Muslims in Northern Kerala. Muslims share the common language of Malayalam with the other religious communities of Kerala.

According to some scholars, the Malabar Muslims are the oldest settled native Muslim community in South Asia. In general, a Muslim Mappila is a descendant of Hindu lower caste natives who converted to Islam. Mappilas are but one among the many communities that form the Muslim population of Kerala. No census report where the Muslim communities are mentioned separately is available.

The Muslim community originated primarily as a result of West Asian contacts with Kerala, which was fundamentally based upon commerce ("the spice trade"). As per local tradition, Islam reached the Malabar Coast and Kerala as early as the 7th century AD. Before being overtaken by the Europeans in the spice trade, Malabar Muslims were a prosperous trading community, settling mainly in the coastal urban centres of Kerala. The continuous interaction of Mappilas with the Middle East has created a profound impact on their life, customs, and culture. This has resulted in the formation of a unique Indo-Islamic synthesis—within the large spectrum of Kerala culture—in literature, art, food, language, and music.

Most Muslims in Kerala follow the Shafi'i school, while a large minority follow movements such as Salafism. Contrary to a popular misconception, the caste system, like in other parts of South Asia, does exist among the Muslims of Kerala. (Although all Muslims are allowed to worship in all Kerala mosques, certain communities are held in "lower status" to others.) A number of different communities, some of them having distant ethnic roots, exist as status groups in Kerala. Among the Mappilas, there are numerous social groups. Various factors such as intermarriage, migration and conversion had led to creation of these groups, these groups were Sayyids (Thangals), Keyis (Koyas), Baramis, Themims, Pusalars, and Ossans found in different regions of Kerala.

== Terminology ==
The name Mappila, otherwise transliterated as Māppila or Moplah, is a straightforward transliteration of the contemporary Malayalam lexeme. Although its etymology is not established, it is usually assumed to have originally been an honorific, created by combining mahā ("great") with piḷḷa ("child").

Traditionally, the name was given to foreign visitors and immigrants, including Christian, Jews and Muslim as "Nazrane Mappila" and "Juda Mappila", respectively, either as a general term of respect or in a technical sense to mean "bridegroom" or "son-in-law." The second sense implies a practice of intermarriage, a reading which is supported by current vernacular usage in Malayalam and Tamil dialects.

Other hypotheses, including those of an Arabic etymology, have been proposed, but are not generally accepted. Mappila later became a name for the native Muslim community of Malabar, although it is still used sporadically of Syrian Christians who live in South Kerala.

== Demographics and distribution ==
=== Demographics ===
According to the 2011 census, about one-quarter of Kerala's population (26.56%) are Muslims. The calculated Muslim population (2011) in Kerala state is 88,73,472. The number of Muslims in rural areas is only 42,51,787, against an urban population of 46,21,685.

=== Distribution ===
Distribution of Muslims in Kerala – District-wise.

The number of Muslims is particularly high in the northern Kerala (former Malabar District). Mappilas are also found in Lakshadweep islands in the Arabian Sea. The Mappilas inhabiting the islands of Androth, Kavaratti, Agatti and Kalpeni in the Lakshadweep were descended from Hindu migrants from the mainland who had converted to Islam in the fourteenth century. A small number of Malayali Muslims have settled in the southern districts of Karnataka, while the scattered presence of the community in major cities of India can also be seen. When the British supremacy on Malabar District was established, many Mappilas were recruited for employment in plantations in Burma, Assam and for manual labor in South East Asian concerns of the British Empire. Diaspora groups of Mappilas are also found in Singapore and Malaysia. Furthermore, a substantial proportion of Muslims have left Kerala to seek employment in the Middle East, especially in Saudi Arabia and United Arab Emirates.

The 2011 Census of India collected data on the district-wise distribution of the Muslim population.

District wise map of Kerala	District	Total Pop	Muslims	% of Pop	% of Muslims
	Kasargod	1,307,375	486,913	37.24%	5.49%
	Kannur	2,523,003	742,483	29.43%	8.37%
	Wayanad	817,420	234,185	28.65%	2.64%
	Kozhikode	3,086,293	1,211,131	39.24%	13.65%
	Malappuram	4,112,920	2,888,849	70.24%	32.56%
	Palakkad	2,809,934	812,936	28.93%	9.16%
	Thrissur	3,121,200	532,839	17.07%	6.00%
	Ernakulam	3,282,388	514,397	15.67%	5.80%
	Idukki	1,108,974	82,206	7.41%	0.93%
	Kottayam	1,974,551	126,499	6.41%	1.43%
	Alappuzha	2,127,789	224,545	10.55%	2.53%
	Pathanamthitta	1,197,412	55,074	4.60%	0.62%
	Kollam	2,635,375	508,500	19.30%	5.73%
	Thiruvananthapuram	3,301,427	452,915	13.72%	5.10%
	All districts	33,406,061	8,873,472	26.56%	100.0%

=== Portuguese distinctions ===
The Muslims present in Kerala were distinguished by the Portuguese historians into two groups:

- Mouros da Terra ("Moors of the Land").
- Mouros da Arabia/Mouros de Meca ("Moors from Arabia/Mecca").

The latter, also known as the "Paradesi Muslims", in fact came from all over the Islamic world. They included Arabs, Persians, Egyptians, Turks, Iraqis, Gujaratis, Khorasanis and Deccanis (and Melakans, Sumatrans, Bengalis). These Muslims were not unsettled navigators but had settled in Kerala. Historians hold differing views on the origin of the Mappila community, with no consensus on the matter. A Mappila is either,

1. A descendant of any native convert (vast majority were Nair, Ezhavar, Thiyyar, Pulayar, Mukkuvar and Brahmin) to Islam (or)
2. A descendant of a marriage alliance between a Middle Eastern individual and a native low caste woman

According to Duarte Barbosa, a Portuguese commercial agent, Mappilas were an indigenous Muslim community and displayed cultural affinity with Hindu castes like Nayars. He also made a distinction between them and Pardeshis, who were mostly wealthy expatriate Arab merchants and not permanent residents of Kerala.

Stephen Dale states that Barbosa accurately "identified the two aspects of Muslim-Hindu social relations," which were the primary causes of the growth of Muslim society in later centuries when the number of Arab traders had dwindled with the arrival of the Portuguese and other European powers in the Indian Ocean. These two aspects were conversion and intermarriage, he argued that "the Heathen, if displeased with anything at all, become Moors." He also noted the frequency of multiple marriages among Muslims and their concubinage of lower-caste women as having served as the genesis of a local Malayalam speaking Mappila society.

Till the 16th century, as noticed by the contemporary observers, Muslims settled mainly along the coastal tracts of Kerala (especially in major Kerala ports such as Calicut (Kozhikode), Cannanore (Kannur), Tanore (Tanur), Funan (Ponnani), Cochin (Kochi) and Quilon (Kollam)). They were traditionally elite merchants who were all part of the brisk foreign trade. Until well into the European period, the Muslims were almost exclusively concentrated in the port cities. Middle Eastern sailors had to rely on lighterage at most of the Kerala ports in the medieval period. This led them to enter into mutually beneficial relationships with the traditional sea fishermen community. A large majority of fishermen, once low-caste Hindus, in northern Kerala now follow Islam.

=== Inland Growth ===
According to Dale, the "great majority" of conversions to Islam "must have come from lower castes," as lower castes, feeling degraded by the caste system, had the most reasons to convert, corroborating Zayn al-Din al-Malibari's attribution of conversion as the reason behind the rapid growth of Muslim settlements on the Malabar Coast. After and during the Portuguese period, some of the Muslim merchants were forced to turn inland (Malabar) in search of alternative occupations to commerce. Some acquired land and became landowners and some became agricultural labourers. Between 16th and 20th centuries, the collective Mappila numbers increased rapidly in Malabar and Travancore and Kochi regions, chiefly by the conversion among the lower and 'outcaste' Hindu groups of the South Malabar interior. The peak of the Muslim distribution in Kerala had gradually shifted to the interior Malabar District. William Logan, comparing the Census Reports of 1871 and 1881, famously concluded that within ten years some 50,000 people from the Cheruma community (former untouchables) converted to Islam. Muslim growth in the 20th century has considerably outpaced that of the general Kerala population due to higher birth rates.

=== British distinctions ===
During the British period the so-called Mappila Outbreaks, c. 1836–1921 led the officials to make and maintain a distinction between the interior Mappilas and the 'respectable' Mappila traders of the coastal cities, such as Calicut. The two other regional groupings are the high-status Muslim families of Cannanore in North Malabar — arguably converts from high caste Hindus — and the Muslims of Travancore and Cochin. The Colonial administrates also kept a distinction between coastal and inland Mappilas of the South Malabar.

- Thangals (the Sayyids) – at the top were the aristocratic Tangals (the Sayyids), who claim descent from the family of Muhammad.
- Landed Aristocracy - the Arabis were followed by the landed aristocracy, centred on Cannanore, North Malabar, arguably converts from high caste Hindus.
- Lastly, there were the converts from the Backward and Scheduled Hindu castes (such as the South Malabar interior Mappilas, Pusalars/Puyislans and the Ossans).

== History ==
=== Arrival of Islam in Kerala and Lakshadweep ===
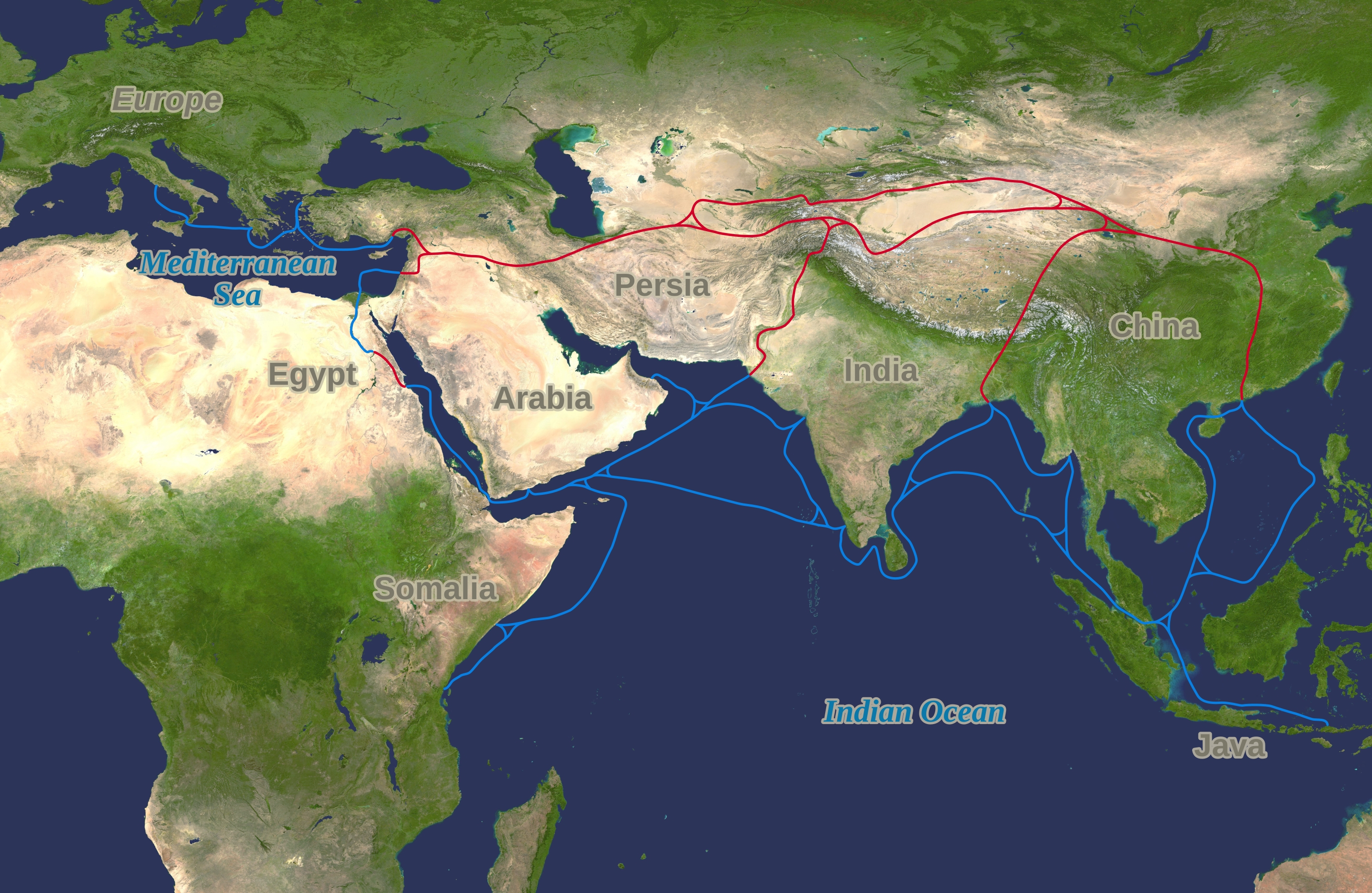
Ancient Silk Road map showing the then trade routes. The spice trade was mainly along the water routes (blue).

Names, routes and locations of the Periplus of the Erythraean Sea (1st century CE)

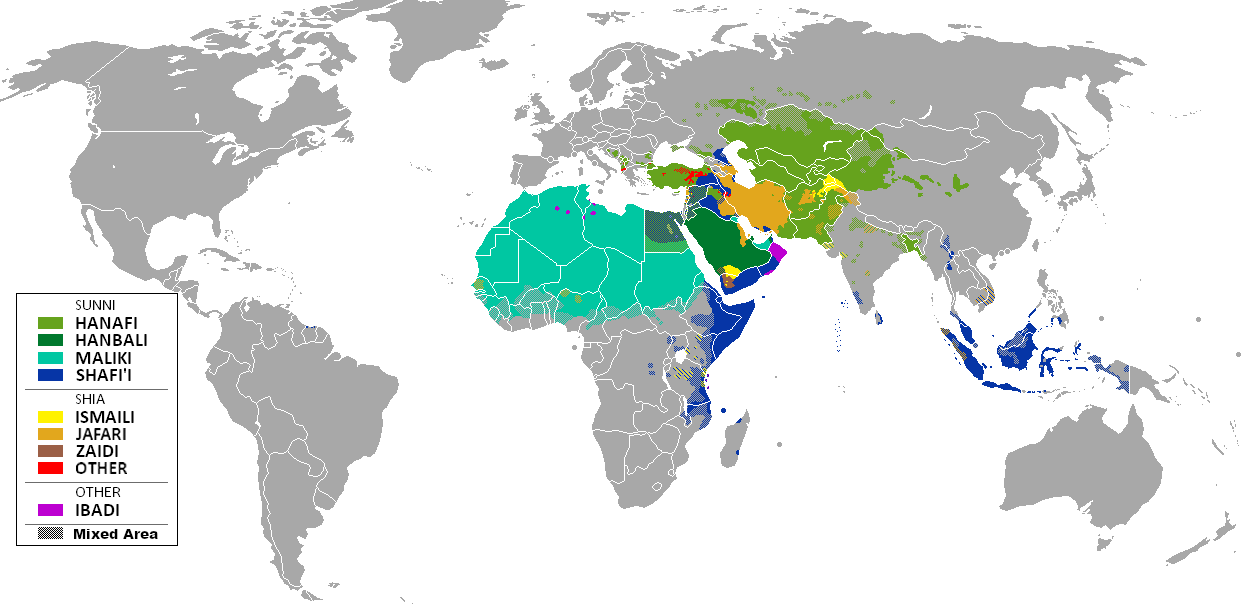
Schools of thought among Muslims

Kerala has been a major spice exporter since 3000 BCE, according to Sumerian records and it is still referred to as the "Garden of Spices" or as the "Spice Garden of India". Kerala's spices attracted ancient Arabs, Babylonians, Assyrians and Egyptians to the Malabar Coast in the 3rd and 2nd millennia BCE. Phoenicians established trade with Kerala during this period. Arabs and Phoenicians were the first to enter Malabar Coast to trade Spices. The Arabs on the coasts of Yemen, Oman, and the Persian Gulf, must have made the first long voyage to Kerala and other eastern countries. They must have brought the Cinnamon of Kerala to the Middle East. The Greek historian Herodotus (5th century BCE) records that in his time the cinnamon spice industry was monopolised by the Egyptians and the Phoenicians.

Islam arrived in Malabar Coast, a part of the larger Indian Ocean rim, via spice and silk traders from the Middle East. It is generally agreed among scholars that Middle Eastern merchants frequented the Malabar Coast, which was the link between the West and ports of East Asia, even before Islam had been established in Arabia. The western coast of India was the chief centre of Middle Eastern trading activities right from at least 4th century AD and by about 7th century AD, and several West Asian merchants had taken permanent residence in some port cities of the Malabar Coast. According to popular tradition, Islam was brought to Lakshadweep, situated just to the west of Malabar Coast, by Ubaidullah in 661 CE. His grave is believed to be located on the island of Andrott. A number of foreign accounts have mentioned about the presence of considerable Muslim population in the coastal towns of Kerala. Arab writers such as Masudi of Baghdad (934–955 AD), Idrisi (1154 AD), Abul-Fida (1213 AD) and al-Dimishqi (1325 AD) mentions the Muslim communities in Kerala. Some historians assume that the Mappilas can be considered as the first native, settled Islamic community in South Asia.

The Southwestern Coast of India was known as "Malabar" (a mixture of Mala and Arabic or Persian Barr, most probably) to the West Asians. Persian scholar al-Biruni (973–1052 AD) appears to have been the first to call the region by this name. Masudi of Baghdad (896–965 AD) speaks about the contacts between Malabar and Arabia. Authors such as Ibn Khurdad Beh (869 – 885 AD), Ahmad al Baladhuri (892 AD), and Abu Zayd of Ziraf (916 AD) mentions Malabar ports in their works.

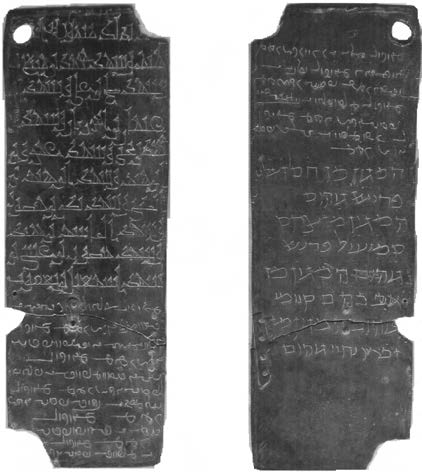
Quilon Syrian Copper Plate (c. 883 AD)

Scholar C. N. Ahammad Moulavi has mentioned that he has seen at Irikkalur near Valapattanam a tombstone bearing the date 670 AD/Hijra 50 (it seems that the tombstone is now lost). Inscriptions found on a tombstone on the beach outside the Juma'h Mosque in Panthalayani Kollam record the death of one Abu ibn Udthorman in Hijra 166. The mosque itself contains two medieval royal charters, one on a block of granite built into the steps of the mosque tank and another one a loose stone lying outside, of the Kodungallur Chera king Bhaskara Ravi Manukuladitya (962–1021 AD). The position of the royal Chera charter (in Old Malayalam) inside the mosque suggests that the city belonged to the Muslims or included them or came into their possession at a later stage. A few Umayyad (661–750 AD) coins were discovered from Kothamangalam in the eastern part of Ernakulam district.

The earliest major epigraphic evidence of Muslim merchants in Kerala is a royal charter by Ayyan Atikal, the powerful governor of Kollam under the Chera king of Kodungallur. The Quilon Syrian Copper Plate (c. 883 AD, "the Tabula Quilonensis") is written in Old Malayalam in Vatteluttu script, and concludes with a number of "signatures" in Kufic Arabic, Middle Persian in Pahlavi script and Judaeo-Persian. The charter shows Atikal, in presence of the royal representative from Kodungallur (prince Kota Ravi Vijayaraga) and regional civil and military officials, granting land and serfs to the Tarisapalli, built by Mar Sapir Iso, and conferring privileges on Anchuvannam and Manigramam. The attestation to the copper plates in the Kufic script reads: "[And witness] to this Maymun ibn Ibrahim, Muhammad ibn Manih, Sulh [?Salih] ibn 'Ali, 'Uthaman ibn al-Marzuban, Muhammad ibn Yahya, 'Amr ibn Ibrahim, Ibrahim ibn al-Tayy, Bakr ibn Mansur, al-Qasim ibn Hamid, Mansur ibn 'Isa and, Isma'il ibn Ya'qub". The presence of non-Christian signatures and the names found in the charter prove that the associates of Mar Sapir Iso included Jews and Muslims too. Muslim Arabs and some Persians must have formed permanent settlements at Kollam by this period. The charter gives proof of the status and privileges of trading guilds in Kerala. "Anjuvannam", mentioned in the copper plate, was a merchant association composed Christians, Jews and Muslims.

In keeping with Kodungallur's significant role in the spice trade, the legends of Kerala Christians, Jews and Muslims all depict this port city as the focal point for the spread of their respective faiths. According to the legend of Cheraman Perumal, or as per one version of it, the first Indian mosque was built in 624 AD at Kodungallur with the mandate of the last the ruler (the Cheraman Perumal) of Chera dynasty, who converted to Islam during the lifetime of Muhammad (c. 570–632). Perumal's proselytisers, led by Malik ibn Dinar, established a series of mosques in his kingdom and north of it, thus facilitating the expansion of Islam in Kerala. It is assumed that the first recorded version of this legend is an Arabic manuscript of anonymous authorship known as "Qissat Shakarwati Farmad". While there is no concrete historical evidence for this tradition, there can be little doubt of the early Muslim presence, and of the religious tolerance based on economic imperatives, on the Malabar Coast. The account of conversion of Islam by the then Cheraman Perumal is generally considered apocryphal by mainstream scholars.

First mosques of Malabar according to the Qissat Shakarwati Farmad

According to the Qissat, the first mosque was built by Malik ibn Dinar in Kodungallur, while the rest of the mosques were founded by Malik ibn Habib.

Location	Qadi
Kalankallur (Kodungallur)	Muhammad ibn Malik
Kulam (Kollam)	Hasan ibn Malik
Hili (Madayi)	'Abd al-Rahman ibn Malik
Fakanur/Makanur (Barkur)	Ibrahim ibn Malik
Manjalur (Mangalore)	Musa ibn Malik
Kanjarkut (Kasaragod)	Malik ibn Muhammad
Jurfatan/Jirfatan (Cannanore)	Shahab al-Din ibn 'Umar ibn Muhammad ibn Malik
Darmaftan (Dharmadam)	Hussayn ibn Muhammad ibn Malik al-Madani
Fandarinah (Panthalayani)	Sa'd al-Din ibn Malik al-Madani
Shaliyat (Chaliyam)	Zayn al-Din ibn Muhammad ibn Malik al-Madani

It is believed that Malik Dinar died at Thalangara in Kasaragod town. The Koyilandy Jumu'ah Mosque contains an Old Malayalam inscription written in a mixture of Vatteluttu and Grantha scripts which dates back to the 10th century CE. It is a rare surviving document recording patronage by a Hindu king (Bhaskara Ravi) to the Muslims of Kerala. The Arabic inscription on a copper slab within the Madayi Mosque records its foundation year as Hijra 518 (1124 AD). The mosque in the heart of the old Chera capital, the Kodungallur Mosque, has a granite foundation exhibiting 11th–12th century architectural style.

=== Growth of Islam in Kerala ===
The Middle Eastern Muslim traders and Kerala mercantile community went through a long period of peaceful intercultural growth till the arrival of the Portuguese explorers (early 16th century). Quilon (Kollam) in south Kerala was the southernmost of the Kerala ports associated with black pepper. It served as the region's gateway to the eastern Indian Ocean. East and Southeast Asia were the primary markets for Kerala's main export, the spices, until at least the c. 15th century. In 1403, it seems that, the Ming court first learned of the existence of Malacca from one pepper merchant, a Muslim believed to have come from the Malabar Coast.

According to Miller, from the very beginning, Hindu outcastes preferred working under wealthy Arab merchants, as this imposed fewer restrictions on them than they would have faced as outcastes. Moroccan traveller Ibn Battutah (14th century) has recorded the considerably huge presence of Muslim merchants and settlements of sojourning traders in most of the ports of Kerala. Immigration, intermarriage and missionary activity/conversion — secured by the common interest in the spice trade — helped in this development. The monopoly of overseas spice trade in the Arabian Sea was safe with the Arab and Persian shipping magnates from the Malabar Coast. Fortunes of these merchants depended on the political patronage of the native chiefs of Calicut (Kozhikode), Cannanore (Kannur), Cochin (Kochi), and Quilon (Kollam). The chiefs of these tiny kingdoms derived a great part of their revenue from taxing the spice trade. A 13th century granite inscription, in Old Malayalam and Arabic, at Muchundi Mosque in Calicut mentions a donation by the king to the mosque. The inscription is the only surviving historical document recording royal endowment by a Hindu ruler, in the form of a grant, to the Muslim community in Kerala.

By the early decades of the 14th century, travellers speak of Calicut (Kozhikode) as the major port city in Kerala. Some of the important administrative positions in the kingdom of Calicut, such as that of the port commissioner, were held by Muslims. The port commissioner, the "shah bandar", represented commercial interests of the Muslim merchants. In his account, Ibn Batttutah mentions Shah Bandars in Calicut and Quilon (Ibrahim Shah Bandar and Muhammed Shah Bandar). The "nakhudas", merchant magnates owning ships, spread their shipping and trading business interests across the Indian Ocean. The famous nakhuda Mishkal who possessed ships for the trade with China, Yemen and Persia was active in Calicut in the 1340s. But unlike in some of the other regions of the Indian Ocean, in Kerala, it seems that the nakhudas did not held any positions of commercial, communal leadership. The Muslim line of Ali Rajas of Arakkal, near Cannanore, who were the vassals of the Kolathiri, ruled over the Lakshadweep. Zayn al-Din Makhdum (c. 1498–1581) estimates that 10% of the population of Malabar was Muslim by the midpoint of the 16th century AD. Samarqandi said that in Calicut he met Muslims among the "horde of infidels", and that both kings and beggars wear the same thing but that the Muslims wear fine clothing in the Arab fashion.

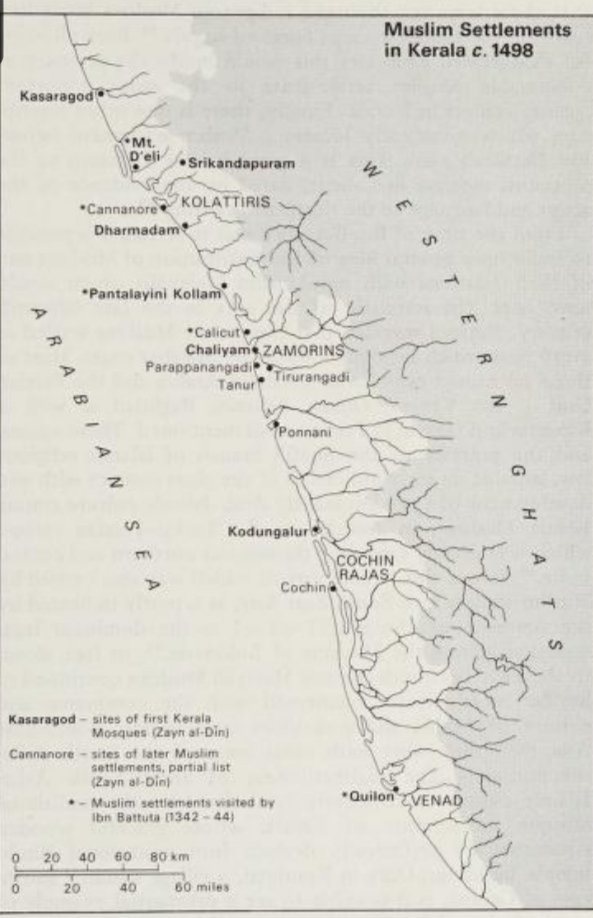
Early Arab settlements in Kerala up to 1496

The Middle Eastern Muslims controlled the lucrative western arm of the overseas long-distance trade (to the ports of the Red Sea, and the Persian Gulf) from the Malabar Coast. Export items across the Arabian Sea included spices such as pepper, ginger and cardamom, trans-shipped textiles, coconuts and associated products. Gold, copper, and silver, horses, silk and various aromatics were imported into Kerala. The native Muslims dominated the trade to Pegu, Mergui, Melaka (in Myanmar and Malaysia) and points east, and the Indian coastal trade (Canara, Malabar, Ceylon, Maldives and Coromandel Coast, and other Bay of Bengal shores) with the Chettis from Coromandel Coast. Muslims, with Gujarati Vanias, also took part in the trade with ports of Gujarat. The Indian coastal trade included goods such as coconuts, coir, pepper, cardamom, cinnamon and rice. Rice was a major import item into Kerala, from the Canara and the Coromandel Coast. Low-value but high-volume trade in foodstuffs that passed through the Gulf of Mannar was also handled by the native Muslims.

According to Stephen Dale, upcountry trade was carried mostly by Mappilas, many lower caste Hindus from the local countryside converted to Islam in the settlements established by them.

The women from fisher and mariner castes often intermarried with Arabs. Andre Wink states that extensive conversion to Islam took place due to the history of trade, seafaring, and interaction with the Arabs. The Mukkuvans were among the communities that converted to Islam, becoming known as Pusalars. Dale concludes that, in contrast to the influence of Sufis and other popular movements in the spread of Islam across the Asia, the Mappilas instead gradually grew through "peaceful conversion" due to the contradiction between a "dynamic, egalitarian mercantile" Muslim community and the "exceptionally conservative" version of the Hindu caste system.

=== The European period ===
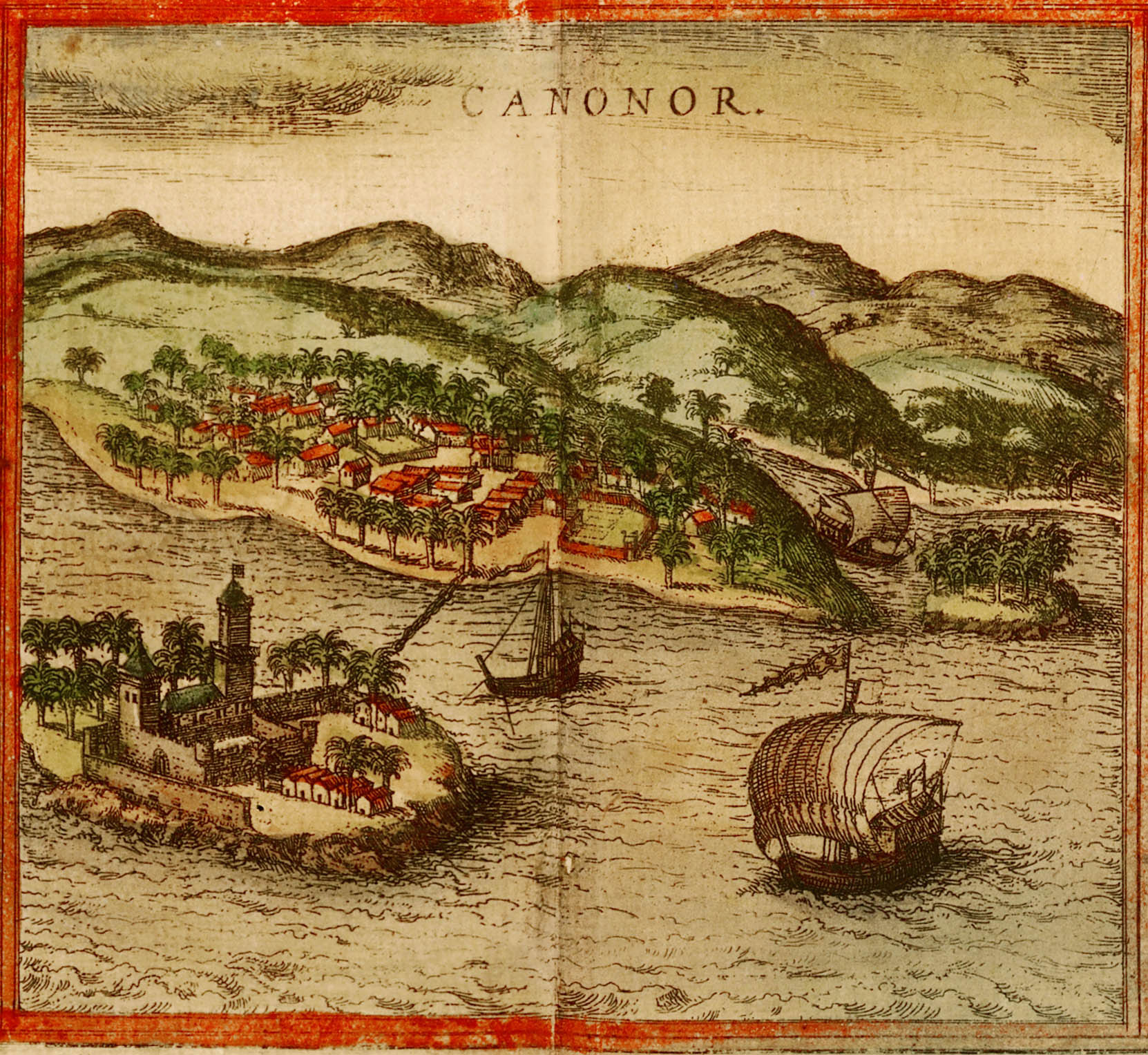
Kannur (Cannanore) in northern Kerala in the 16th century. Whenever a formal war was broke out between the Portuguese and the native rulers, the Portuguese attacked and plundered, as the opportunity offered, the Muslim ports in Kerala.

In the past, there were many Muslim traders in the ports of Malabar. Following the discovery of a direct sea route from Europe to Kozhikode in 1498, the Portuguese began to expand their territories and ruled the seas between Ormus and the Malabar Coast and south to Ceylon. In the first two decades of 16th century CE (c. 1500–1520), Portuguese traders were successful in reaching in agreements with the local Hindu chiefs and native Muslim (Mappila) merchants in Kerala. The major contradiction was between the Portuguese state and the Arab and Persian traders, and the Kingdom of Calicut. In January 1502, the First Battle of Cannanore between the Third Portuguese Armada and Kingdom of Cochin under João da Nova and Zamorin of Kozhikode's navy marked the beginning of Portuguese conflicts in the Indian Ocean. The big Mappila traders in Cochin supplied large quantities of Southeast Asian spices to the Portuguese carracks. These traders, along with the Syrian Christians, acted as brokers and intermediaries in the purchase of spices and in the sale of the goods brought from Europe. Wealthy Muslim merchants of the Malabar Coast – including Mappilas – provided large credits to the Portuguese. These businessmen received large trading concessions, stipends and privileges in return. Interaction between the Portuguese private traders and Mappila merchants also continued to be tolerated by the Portuguese state. Kingdom of Calicut, whose shipping was increasingly looted by the Portuguese, evolved into a centre of Muslim resistance. In February 1509, the defeat of the joint fleet of the Sultan of Gujarat, the Mamlûk Burji Sultanate of Egypt, and the Zamorin of Calicut with support of the Republic of Venice and the Ottoman Empire in Battle of Diu marked the beginning of Portuguese dominance of the Spice trade and the Indian Ocean.

Sooner rather than later, tensions arose between the wealthy Mappila traders of Cannanore and the Portuguese state. The ships of the Cannanore Mappilas again and again fell prey to the Portuguese sailors off the coast of Maldives, an important point between Southeast Asia and the Red Sea. Interests of the Portuguese casado moradores in Cochin, now planning to capture the spice trade through the Gulf of Mannar and to Sri Lanka, came into the conflict with Mappilas and the (Tamil) Maraikkayars. The narrow gulf held the key to the trade to Bengal (especially Chittagong). By the 1520s, open confrontations between the Portuguese and the Mappilas, from Ramanathapuram, and Thoothukudi to northern Kerala, and to western Sri Lanka, became a common occurrence. The Mappila traders actively worked in even in the island of Sri Lanka to oppose the Portuguese. The Portuguese maintained patrolling squadrons off the Kerala ports and continued their raids on departing Muslim fleets at Calicut and Quilon. After a series of naval battles, the once powerful Mappila chief was finally forced to sue for peace with the Portuguese in 1540. The peace was soon broken, with the assassination of the qazi of Cannanore Abu Bakr Ali (1545), and the Portuguese again came down hard on the Mappilas. In the meantime, the Portuguese also entered into friendship with some of the leading Middle Eastern merchants residing on the Malabar Coast (1550). The mantle of the Muslim resistance was now taken by the Ali Rajas of Cannanore, who even forced the king of Calicut to turn against the Portuguese once again. By the close of the 16th century, the Ali Rajas had emerged as figures with as much influence in Kerala as the Kolathiri (Chirakkal Raja) himself.

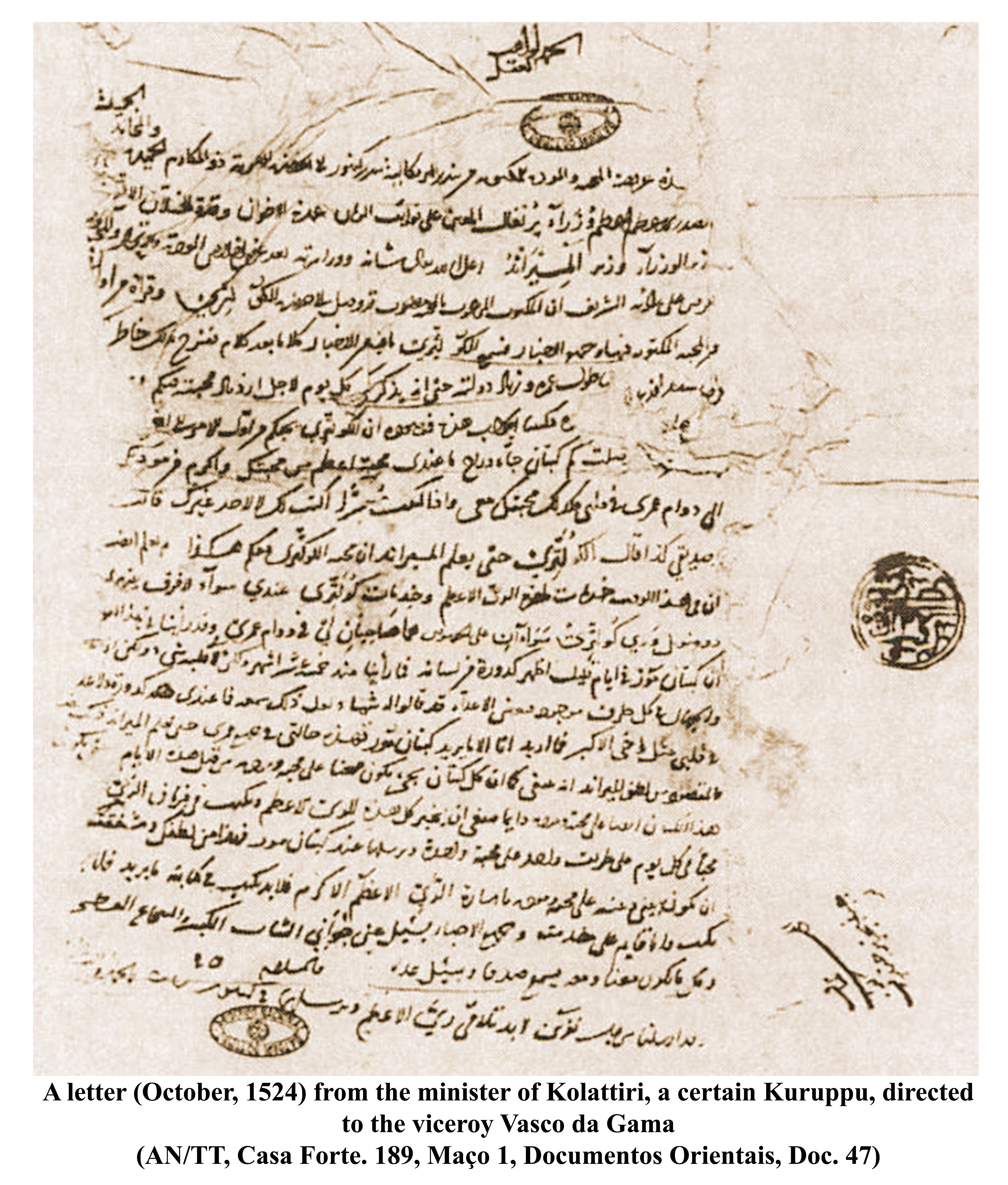
Kolattiri Raja's minister Kuruppu's Arabic letter to da Gama (1524)

Before the 16th century, Middle Eastern Muslims dominated the economic, social and religious affairs of Kerala Muslims. Many of these merchants fled Kerala in the course of the 16th century. The vacuum created economic opportunities for some Mappila traders, who also took on a greater role in the social and religious affairs in Malabar. The Portuguese tried to establish a monopoly in the spice trade in India, using violent naval warfare. Whenever a formal war was broke out between the Portuguese and the Calicut rulers, the Portuguese attacked and plundered, as the opportunity offered, the Muslim ports in Kerala. Small, lightly armed, and highly mobile vessels of the Mappilas remained a major threat to Portuguese shipping all along the west coast of India. Mappila merchants, now controlling pepper trade in Calicut in the place of the West Asian Muslims, drew Mappila corsairs and used them to transport the spices past Portuguese blockades. Some Mappila traders even tried to outwit the Portuguese by reorienting their trade to Western Indian ports. Some chose an overland route, across the Western Ghats, for the export of spices. By the end of the 16th century, the Portuguese were finally able to deal with the "Mappila challenge". Kunjali Marakkar was defeated and killed, with the help of the Calicut ruler, in c. 1600 AD. The Ali Rajas of Cannanore was given permission to send ships to even to the Red Sea, as a way of ensuring their cooperation. The relentless battles led to the eventual decline of the Muslim community in Kerala, as they gradually lost control of the spice trade. The Muslims — who had been depended solely on commerce — were reduced into severe economic perplexity. Some traders turned inland (South Malabar) in search of alternate occupations to commerce. The Muslims of Kerala gradually became a society of small traders, landless labourers and poor fishermen. The once affluent, and urban, Muslim population became predominantly rural in Kerala.

The Tuhfat Ul Mujahideen written by Zainuddin Makhdoom II (born around 1532) of Ponnani during 16th-century CE is the first-ever known book fully based on the history of Kerala, written by a Keralite. It is written in Arabic and contains pieces of information about the resistance put up by the navy of Kunjali Marakkar alongside the Zamorin of Calicut from 1498 to 1583 against Portuguese attempts to colonise Malabar coast. It was first printed and published in Lisbon. A copy of this edition has been preserved in the library of Al-Azhar University, Cairo. Tuhfatul Mujahideen also describes the history of Mappila Muslim community of Kerala as well as the general condition of Malabar Coast in the 16th century CE. For decades, the Malabari Mappila Muslims which representing the Mughal empire are already patronized Aceh Sultanate.

The Kingdom of Mysore, ruled by Sultan Haider Ali, invaded and occupied northern Kerala in the late-18th century. In the following Mysore rule of Malabar, Muslims were favoured against the high caste Hindu landlords. Some were able to obtain some land rights and administrative positions. There was a sharp increase in community's growth, especially through conversions from the "outcaste" society. However, such measures of the Mysore rulers only widened the communal imbalance of Malabar. The East India Company — taking advantage of the situation — allied with the Hindu high castes to fight against the occupied regime. The British subsequently won the Anglo-Mysore War against Mysore ruler Tipu Sultan and, consequently, Malabar was organised as a district under Madras Presidency.

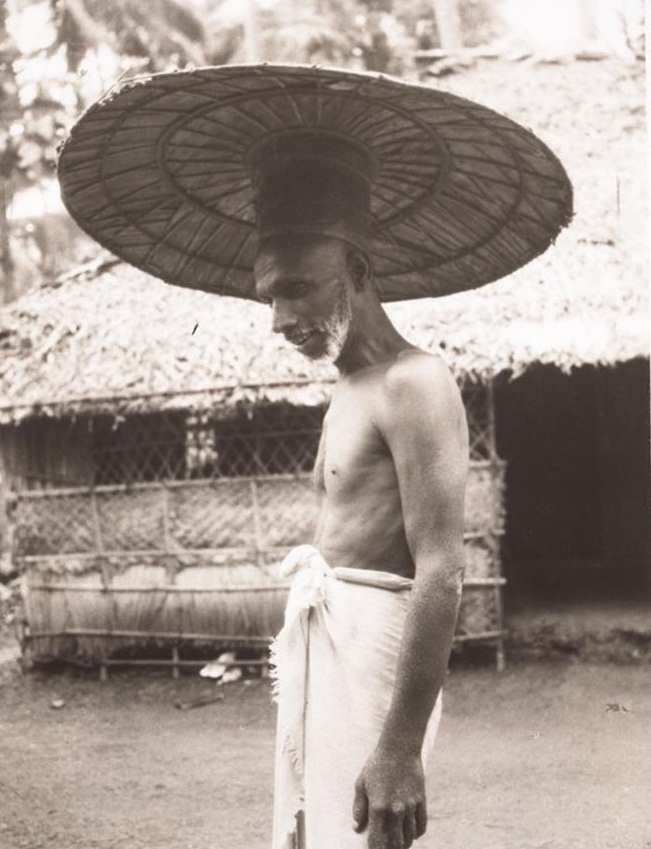
A Mappila from Malabar District (1926–1933)

Conversion to Islam continued into the British period. In the 1871 census report, the Cherumars numbered 99,000, but in the following decade, their population dwindled to 64,725. The Cherumars, a low-caste Hindu peasant group, were mass-converted to Islam by Mappila peasants during the Mappila uprisings. L. R. S. Lakshmi states that the census report attributed this decline to conversions, which could be explained by the "poor economic conditions" among the Cherumars, who saw "possible work incentives available within the flourishing Mappila community." Despite converting to Islam, they continued to occupy a lower social position in the Mappila hierarchy.

The discriminatory land tenure system — tracing its origins to pre modern Kerala — gave Muslims of Kerala (and other tenants and labourers) no access to land ownership. This led to a series of violent attacks against the high caste landlords and colonial administration (the Mappila Outbreaks, c. 1836–1921) and in 1921–22; it took in the form of an explosion known as Mappila Uprising (Malabar Rebellion). The uprising — which initially had the support of Indian National Congress leaders such as Mohandas K. Gandhi- was suppressed by the colonial government, with martial law being temporarily instituted in the region and the leaders of the rebellion tried and executed.

=== Post-colonial era ===
The Muslim material strength — along with the extent of modern education, theological "reform", and active participation in democratic process — recovered slowly after the 1921–22 Uprising. The Muslim numbers in provincial and central government posts remained staggeringly low. The Mappila literacy rate was only 5% in 1931. Even by 1947, only 3% of the taluk officers in Malabar region were Muslim.

The community was able to produce a number of high-regarded leaders in the following years. This included Mohammed Abdur Rahiman, and E. Moidu Moulavi of the Congress Party, and most crucially, the inspirational K. M. Seethi Sahib (1898–1960). Although the Muslim League faded into memory in the rest of India, it remained a serious political force in the state of Kerala with leaders such as Syed Abdurrahiman Bafaki Tangal, P. M. S. A. Pukkoya Tangal, and C. H. Mohammed Koya. K. O. Ayesha Bai, a member of Muslim community, the first Muslim women to rise to public fame in modern Kerala, became the Deputy Speaker of the Communist Kerala Assembly in 1957.

Active participation in the state elections gave rise to a psychology of accommodation that took the Muslims into cooperate relationships with Hindus and Christians of Kerala. The Communist-lead Kerala government granted the wish of the Muslim League for the formation of a Muslim majority district in 1969. University of Calicut, with the former Malabar District being its major catchment area, was established in 1968. Calicut International Airport, currently the twelfth busiest airport in India, was inaugurated in 1988. An Indian Institute of Management (IIM) was established at Kozhikode in 1996 and National Institute of Technology in 2002.

Modern Mappila theological revisions and social reforms were initiated by Wakkom Maulavi (1873–1932) in Kollam. The Maulavi was initially influenced by Muḥammad 'Abduh and Rashīd Riḍā, and to some degree by the ideas of Jamāl al-Dīn al-Afghānī and Muḥammad ibn 'Abd al-Wahhāb. He notably encouraged the Mappilas to adopt English education. Notable reformers such as K. M. Seethi Sahib (1898–1960), Khatib Muhammad K. M. Maulavi (1886–1964), E. K. Maulavi (1879–1974) and M. K. Haji carried his work forward to the modern age. K. M . Maulavi tried to spread the new ideas of southern Kerala to the more orthodox Malabar region. C. O. T. Kunyipakki Sahib, Maulavi Abussabah Ahmedali (died 1971), K. A. Jaleel, C. N. Ahmad Moulavi, and K. O. Ayesha Bai were other prominent social and political reformers of the 20th century. An organisation known as the Muslim Educational Society (MES), founded in 1964 by P. K. Abdul Ghafoor and friends, also played a role in the development of the community. Aikya Sangham (founded in 1922, Kodungallur) and Farook College (founded 1948) also promoted the higher education among the Muslims.

A large number of Muslims of Kerala found extensive employment in the Persian Gulf countries in the following years (beginning in the mid-1960s). This widespread participation in the Gulf Rush produced huge economic and social benefits for the community. Great influx funds from the earnings of Mappilas employed followed. Issues such as widespread poverty, unemployment and educational backwardness began to change. The Mappila community is now considered as section of Indian Muslims marked by recovery, change and positive involvement in the modern world. Mappila women are now not reluctant to join professional vocations and assuming leadership roles. As per the latest government data, female literacy rate in Malappuram District, centre of Mappila distribution, stood at 91.55% (2011 Census). Lulu Group chairman M. A. Yusuf Ali, 19th richest man in India, is the richest Malayali, according to the Forbes magazine (2018). Azad Moopen, chairman of the Dubai-headquartered Aster DM Healthcare, is another major Muslim entrepreneur from Kerala. During his state visit to Saudi Arabia in 2016, Indian Prime Minister Narendra Modi presented the Saudi king Salman with a gold-plated replica of the Kodungallur Mosque.

Ever since in the Indian Independence from the British in 1947, the overwhelming majority of Muslims in former Malabar District have supported the Muslim League. In south Kerala, the community generally supported Indian National Congress and in the north Kerala a small proportion vote Communist Left. Politically, the Muslims in Kerala have exhibited more unanimity than any other major communities in modern Kerala.

== Nair Muslims and Marumakkathayam ==
Muslim converts from the Nair caste in North Malabar (Including some parts of Kozhikode), particularly during the medieval period, continued to practice aspects of the Nair matrilineal system, known as Marumakkathayam (or Thaavazhi), even after conversion to Islam. This system, which traced descent and inheritance through the female line, centered around the Tharavadu (ancestral home), with the Karanavar (maternal uncle) serving as the head of the family. Despite Islamic law advocating an egalitarian system of inheritance, many of these converted families, especially in the Malabar region, retained matrilineal customs for several generations, reflecting the deep influence of pre-Islamic social structures. Over time, with the increasing influence of Islamic norms, most of these families gradually transitioned to an egalitarian system, though elements of the matrilineal system persisted in some communities, highlighting the complex interaction between cultural traditions and religious practices in Kerala.

== Theological orientations/denominations ==
Most of the Muslims of Kerala follow the traditional Shāfiʿī school of religious law (known in Kerala as the traditionalist Sunnis) while a large minority follow modern movements that developed within Sunni Islam. The latter section consists of majority Salafists (the Mujahids) and the minority Islamists.

The Sunnis referred here are identified by their conventional beliefs and practices and adherence to the Shāfiʿī madhhab, while the other theological orientations, of which the Salafi Mujahids constitute a large majority, are seen as modern "reform" movements within the Sunni Islam. Both the Sunnis and Mujahids again have been divided to a number of sub-identities.

- Sunnī Islam
  - Shāfi'ī— mainly two groups (majority of traditional Sunnis in Kerala are Shafiʽis).
  - Ḥanafī
- Salafists (the Mujahids)—with different splinter factions (with varying degrees of puritanism). Kerala Nadvathul Mujahideen (K. N. M) is the largest Mujahid organisation in Kerala.
- Islamists (the Jama'at-i-Islami India)—representing political Islam in Kerala.
- Shīiah Islam

== Culture ==
=== Literature ===
Mappila Songs/Poems is a famous folklore tradition emerged in c. 16th century. The ballads are compiled in complex blend of Malayalam/Tamil and Arabic, Persian/Urdu in a modified Arabic script. Mappila songs have a distinct cultural identity, as they sound a mix of the ethos and culture of Dravidian South India as well as West Asia. They deal with themes such as romance, satire, religion, and politics. Moyinkutty Vaidyar (1875–91) is generally considered as the poet laureate of Mappila Songs.

As the modern Mappila literature developed after the 1921–22 Uprising, religious publications dominated the field.

Vaikom Muhammad Basheer (1910–1994), followed by, U. A. Khader, K. T. Muhammed, N. P. Muhammed and Moidu Padiyath are leading Mappila authors of the modern age. Mappila periodical literature and newspaper dailies — all in Malayalam — are also extensive and critically read among the Muslims. The newspaper known as "Chandrika", founded in 1934, played as significant role in the development of the Mappila community.

=== Malabar Muslim folk arts ===
- Oppana was a popular form of social entertainment among the Muslims of Kerala. It is generally presented by women numbering about fifteen including musicians, as a part of wedding ceremonies a day before the wedding day. The bride, dressed in all finery, covered with gold ornaments, is the chief spectator; she sits on a peetham, around which the singing and dancing take place. While women sing, they clap their hands rhythmically and move around the bride in steps. Two or three girls begin the songs and the rest join the chorus.
- Kolkali was a popular dance form among the Muslims of Kerala. It is played in group of 12 people with two sticks.
- Duff Muttu (also called Dubh Muttu) was an art form prevalent among Muslims of Kerala, using the traditional duff, or daf, also known as tappitta. Participants dance to the rhythm as they beat the duff.
- Mappila Ramayanam ballad singing is prevalent amongst people who practice folkloric traditions in the Mappila community of Wayanad. Unlike usual religious interpretations, Mappila Ramayanam evokes cultural memories and is set in Malabar Muslim milieu.

=== Cuisine ===
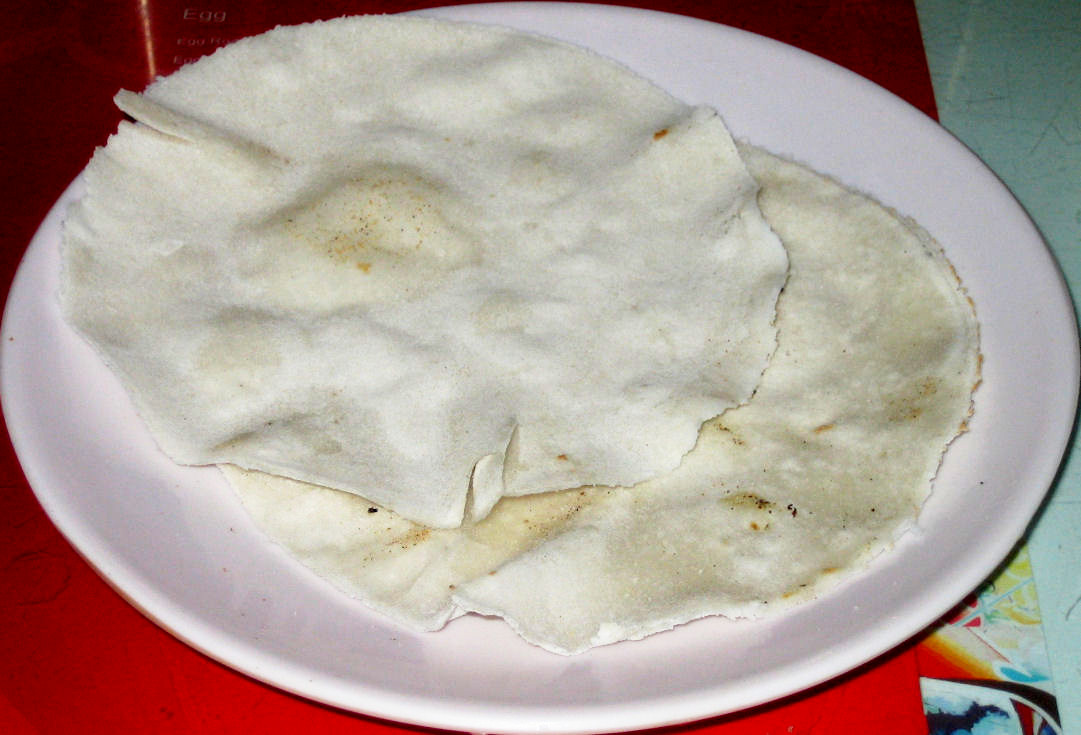
Pathiri, a pancake made of rice flour, is one of the common breakfast dishes in Malabar

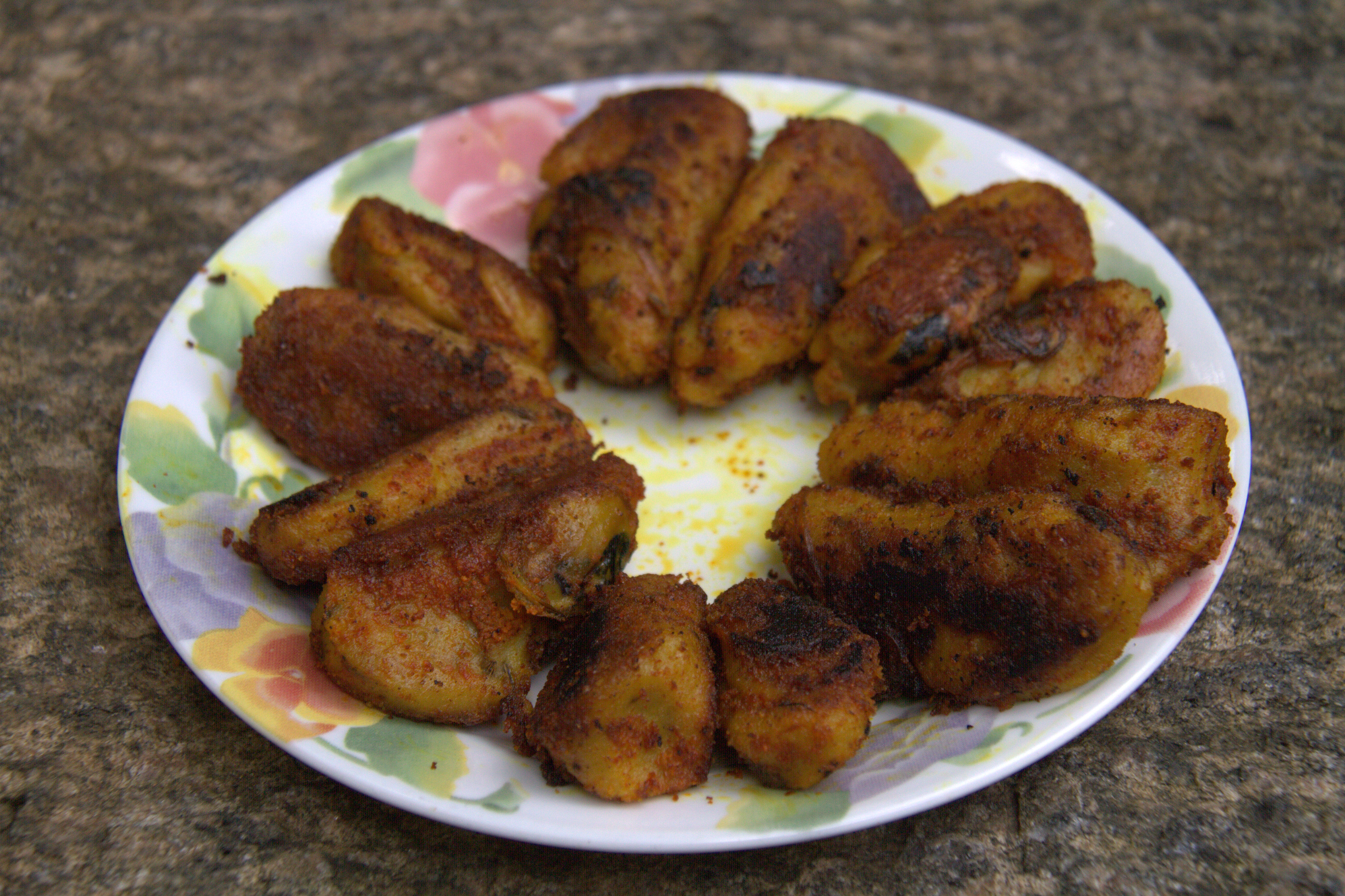
Kallummakkaya nirachathu or arikkadukka (mussels stuffed with rice)

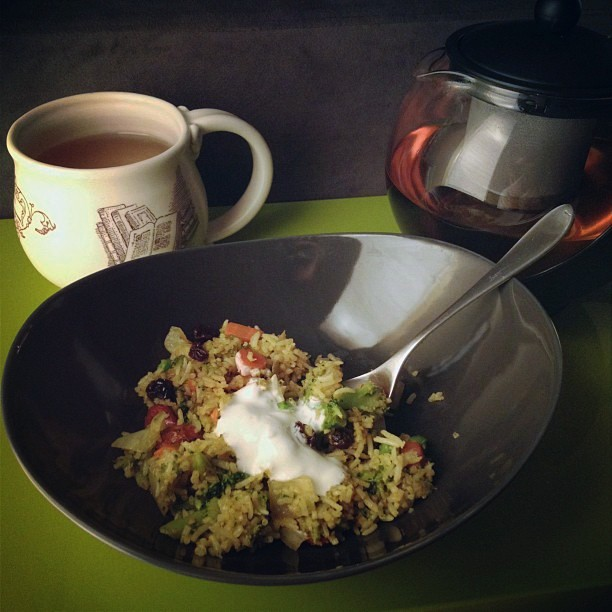
Thalassery biryani with curd

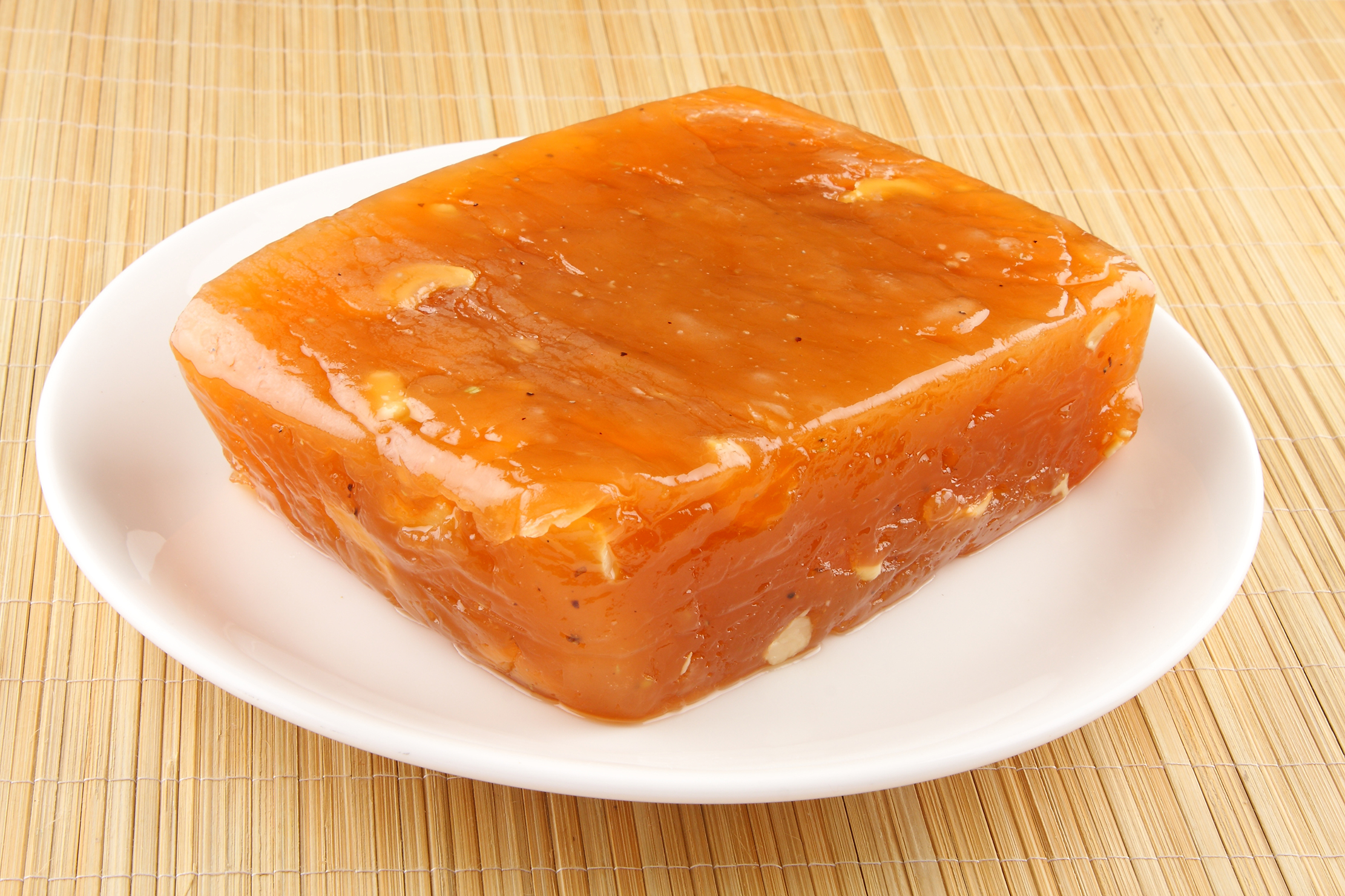
Halwas are popular in towns like Kannur, Thalassery, Kozhikode, and Ponnani

The Mohammaden Mappila cuisine is a blend of traditional Kerala, Persian, Yemenese and Arab food culture. This confluence of culinary cultures is best seen in the preparation of most dishes. Kallummakkaya (mussels) curry, irachi puttu (irachi meaning meat), parottas (soft flatbread), Pathiri (a type of rice pancake) and ghee rice are some of the other specialties. The characteristic use of spices is the hallmark of Mappila cuisine—black pepper, cardamom and clove are used profusely.

The Malabar version of Mandi, popularly known as Pit Mandi in Malayalam is another popular item, which has an influence from Yemen. Various varieties of biriyanis like Thalassery biriyani, Kannur biriyani, Kozhikode biriyani and Ponnani biriyani are prepared by the Mappila community.

The snacks include unnakkaya (deep-fried, boiled ripe banana paste covering a mixture of cashew, raisins and sugar), pazham nirachathu (ripe banana filled with coconut grating, molasses or sugar), muttamala made of eggs, chatti pathiri, a dessert made of flour, like a baked, layered chapati with rich filling, arikkadukka, and more.

== See also ==
- Arabi Malayalam script
- Beary language
