= Zainuddin Makhdoom =

Zainuddin Makhdoom may refer to:

- Zainuddin Makhdoom I, Indian Islamic jusrist
- Zainuddin Makhdoom II, Indian Islamic scholar, writer and religious leader, grandson of the former
