= Qissat Shakarwati Farmad =

Arabic manuscript

- Language: Arabic
- Genre: Legend
- Publication place: Malabar Coast

Qissat Shakarwati Farmad (alternatively Qissat Shakruti Firmad, literally "Tale of the Great Chera Ruler") is an Arabic manuscript of anonymous authorship. It is argued that the qissat is the oldest, most detailed, and comprehensive recorded version of the Cheraman Perumal legend (of south India).

The Cheraman Perumal legend traces the introduction of Islam on the Malabar Coast. All Muslim sources from 1500 CE tell the story of a traditional Hindu spice trader from Kerala, called the Cheraman Perumal divided his spice trade among his family and business partners and sailed for Jeddah for the annual pilgrimage to the Syrian city of Petra and to the Kaaba in Mecca, the shrine of the Quraysh, in a pre-Islamic predecessor to the Islamic hajj. He may have died on his return trade journey from Syria to Malabar Coast.

Shakarwati Farmad is an Arabic version of the medieval Indian royal title "Chakravarti Cheraman Perumal". The Chera (Spice Merchant) king is also referred in the text as "al-Sultan Shakrawati". The qissat is currently preserved in British Library (India Office Records, MS. Islamic 2807d, fols. 81a-104a).

== Versions of the legend ==
The later versions of the Cheraman Perumal legend are incorporated by

- Zayn al-Din Makhdum in Tuhfat al-Mujahidin (16th century CE)^{8} and in
- Ta'rikh-i Firishta (Persian, 17th century CE).

Varied versions of the legend can also be seen

- A number of medieval Kerala literary sources (such as Keralolpatti) and
- Portuguese chronicles.
- A Telugu version of the legend is also mentioned by some scholars.

As per scholar Y. Friedmann, the version famously narrated by Zayn al-Din Makhdum was directly derived from the qissat. Unlike some of the other versions of the legend, large portions of the qissat takes place after the king's death on Arabian coast.

== First mosques of Malabar according to the qissat ==
According to the qissat, the first mosque was built by Malik ibn Dinar in Kodungallur, while the rest of the mosques were founded by Malik ibn Habib.

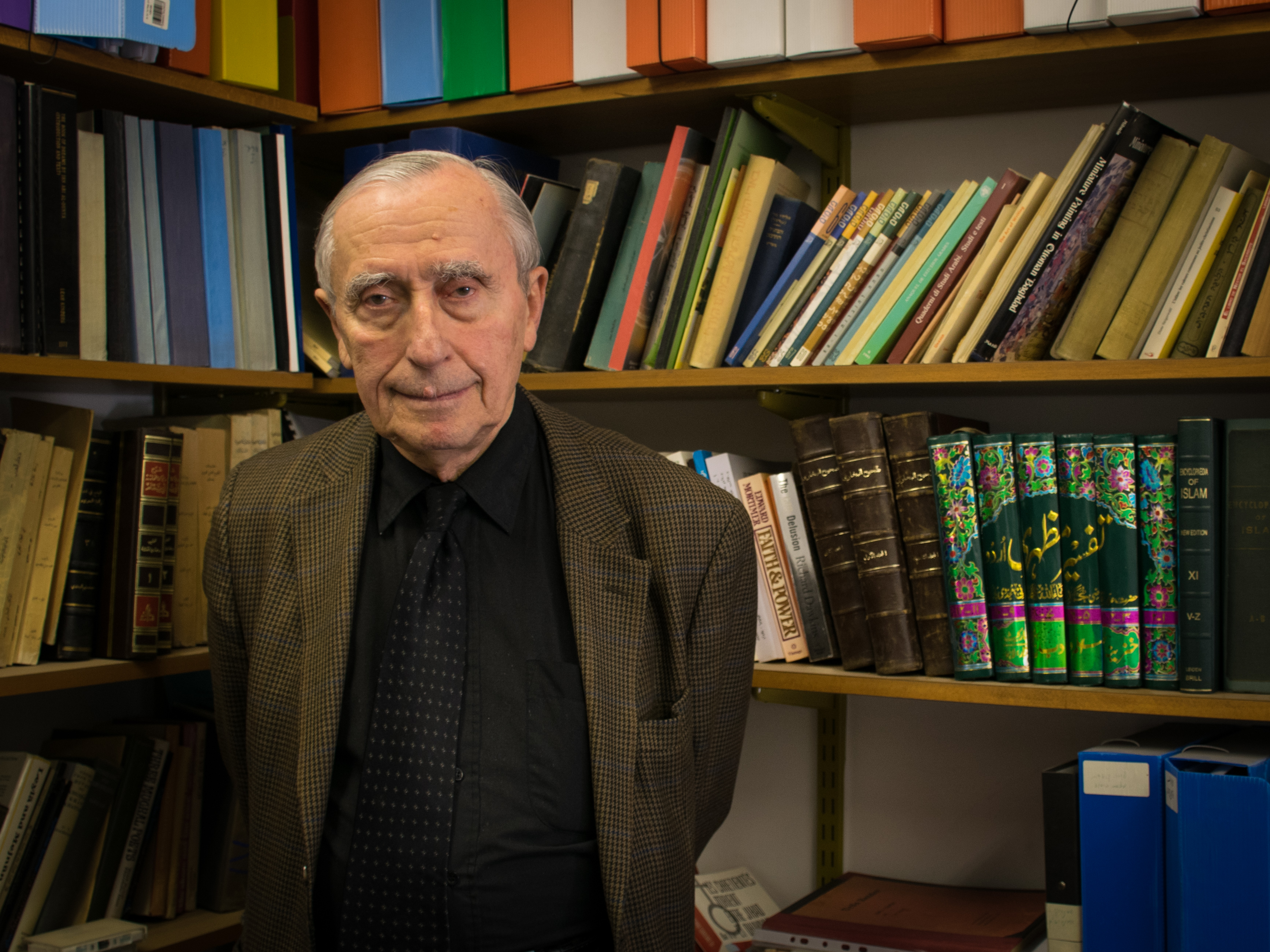
Y. Friedmann conducted pioneering studies on the Qissat in the mid-1970s.

Location	Qadi
Kalankallur (Kodungallur)	Muhammad ibn Malik
Kulam (Kollam)	Hasan ibn Malik
Hili (Madayi)	ʽAbd al-Rahman ibn Malik
Fakanur/Makanur (Barkur)	Ibrahim ibn Malik
Manjalur (Mangalore)	Musa ibn Malik
Kanjarkut (?Kasaragod)	Malik ibn Muhammad
Jurfatan/Jirfatan (Cannanore)	Shahab al-Din ibn 'Umar ibn Muhammad ibn Malik
Darmaftan (Dharmadam)	Hussayn ibn Muhammad ibn Malik al-Madani
Fandarinah (Panthalayani)	Sa'd al-Din ibn Malik al-Madani
Shaliyat (Chaliyam)	Zayn al-Din ibn Muhammad ibn Malik al-Madani

== See also ==
- Thajuddin
