= Pusalan =

Community-status group of Muslims in Kerala, south India

Puslan is a community-status group of Muslims in Kerala, south India. They were the traditional sea fishermen of the central Malabar Coast (northern Kerala).

The other Mappilas used to call them "Kadappurattukar", while themselves were known as "Angadikkar". Pusalan boats are owned collectively by a lineage, and each individual is entitled to a share of the profits. The catches are sold by the Pusalar to other communities, and very rarely are involved in selling their catch.

== History ==
Puslans were mostly converts from the Mukkuvas, a low caste among the Hindus of Kerala. West Asian sailors on the Malabar Coast had to rely on lighterage at most of the Kerala ports in the medieval period. This led them to enter into mutually beneficial relationships with the traditional Hindu sea fishermen community.

== Divisions ==
The Kadappurattukar were divided into two endogamous groups on the basis of their occupation, "Valakkar" and "Bepukar". The Bepukar were considered superior to Valakkar.

== Social status ==
The Pusalan community is still regarded as a financially backward group among Kerala Muslims. Matrimonial alliances with financially elite Muslim families in Kerala are a rarity. Pusalans are allowed enter and pray in Mappila mosques in Kerala. The Puslans were once a low-status group among the Muslims of Kerala.

== See also ==
- Ossan
