= Kalariyullathil =

Village in Kerala, India

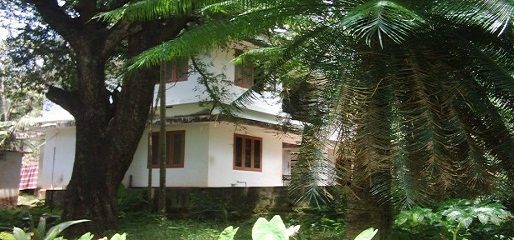
Tharavadu

Kalariyullathil is located in India between Chekkotti Bazar and Koyilothu Thazhe, Thodannure in Thiruvallur panchayat in Kottapally village. It falls under Vatakara Taluk in Kozhikode district [also known as Calicut] which is among the three metropolitan cities of Kerala state. The Kalariyullathil territory is a 6 km drive from Vatakara town heading east on the Kerala Tourist Highway.

== History ==
Kalariyullathil was the famous ground of Kalarippayattu, an ancient form of martial arts for which Vatakara is well known. The Kalariyullathil land was frequently used for training and for hiding in guerrilla warfare by the famous lions of kalaripayattu, the late Kadathanad after whom vatakara was earlier called] and Kunjali Marakkar. They were the patrons of freedom struggle of Malabar Kerala from Vatakara.

== Transportation ==
Kalariyullathil village connects to other parts of India through Vatakara city on the west and Kuttiady town on the east. National highway No.66 passes through Vatakara and the northern stretch connects to Mangalore, Goa, and Mumbai. The southern stretch connects to Cochin and Trivandrum. The eastern Highway going through Kuttiady connects to Mananthavady, Mysore, and Bangalore. The nearest airports are at Kannur and Kozhikode. The nearest railway station is at Vatakara.

== Sources ==
- Kunjali Marakkar

https://web.archive.org/web/20090926051348/http://www.qu.edu.qa/offices/hr/sections/recruitment.php
https://web.archive.org/web/20110716102812/http://www.qu.edu.qa/offices/procurement/contacts.php
http://wikimapia.org/1759899/Vidyaprakash-Public-School
