= Kodava =

Kodava may refer to:

- Kodava people, a people of the hilly region of Coorg in Karnataka, India
  - Kodava maaple, a Muslim community in Karnataka, India
- Kodava language, a Dravidian language spoken by the people

== See also ==
- Coorg or Kodagu, the region in Karnataka, India
