= Tuhfat Ul Mujahideen =

Historical work by Zainuddin Makhdoom II

Tuhfat al-Mujahidin fi ba‘d Akhbar al-Burtughaliyin (Arabic:تحفة المجاهدين في بعض اخبار البرتغاليين, often shortened as Tuhfat al-Mujahidin) is a historical work by Zainuddin Makhdoom II on the struggle between the Mappila Muslims of Malabar and South Canara and Portuguese colonial forces in the 16th century. The book describes the resistance put up by the navy of Kunjali Marakkar alongside the Zamorin of Calicut from 1498 to 1583 against Portuguese attempts to colonize the Malabar coast. Along with chronological events of the era, the book also provides an analysis of the events, as well as the lifestyle, customs and family structure of the people of the time.

== Summary ==
Shaikh Zainuddin Makhdum, born in 1517 AD, was a historian, and a religious scholar from Ponnani. Completed in 1583, his work Tuhfat is one of the few Asian sources that narrate the reaction of the Muslim populations of the Malabar coast to the Portuguese colonial expansion into the south west of India. It is also important as a pioneering work about the origins of the Mappila community in modern-day Kerala and has been reviewed as "a study in liberation theology of Islam". The work was translated into many European languages, notable among which are História dos Portugueses no Malabar, by David Lopes in 1898 and the English translation by S. Muhammad Husayn Nainar, titled Tuhfat al-Mujāhidīn: A Historical Epic of the Sixteenth Century published in 1942 by the University of Madras. Another translation into Malayalam was written by C. Hamza, in 1995.

This is called by many as a source book of struggle against European colonial history. It details the history of Kerala, on the arrival of Islam in Kerala through Malik ibn Dinar. It expounds the extent of good relations between the Zamorins of Calicut and between the Muslims. It traces the socio-cultural decay of the Muslim community and the consequential Portuguese piracy and occupation in Malabar. It prays for the prosperity of the Zamorins and exhorts for the struggle (jihad) of Muslims under the banner of the Zamorins of Calicut, against the Portuguese.

== Contents ==
Completed in 1583, the book was dedicated to the Sultan of Bijapur Ali Adil Shah. The work is divided into four parts — the first discusses in detail about the Islamic concepts of Jihad, followed by a look into history of the Muslim community in the Malabar. It then describes the customs of the Hindu population of the Malabar at the time, and the final fourteen chapters narrate the history of the Portuguese in Malabar and the rise of the naval forces led by the Kunjali Marakkars, from the arrival of the former towards the end of the fifteenth century till the Siege of Chaliyam of 1571.

== Reception ==
P. Govinda Pillai, a leading Marxian critic and journalist in Kerala, has called it "an important event not only in the historical studies of Kerala but in the history of Kerala historiography. This is the first work based on the history of Kerala authored by a Keralite, albeit in Arabic. Moreover, like Thucydides’ Peloponnese War, Tuhfath is credited with extraordinary historicity, since the author narrates events in which he took part in many ways and which he witnessed".

== Translations ==
- S. Muhammad Hussain Nainar (1942), Tuhfat-al-Mujahidin: An Historical Work in The Arabic Language, University of Madras, ISBN 9789839154801
- S. Muhammad Hussain Nainer (2006). Tuḥfat Al-mujāhidīn: A Historical Epic of the Sixteenth Century. Islamic Book Trust. ISBN 9789839154801. (A revised republication of Nainar's 1942 translation)
