= Ulugulli =

- village
- Country: India
- State: Karnataka
- District: Kodagu
- Talukas: Somvarpet

Population (2011)
  - Total: 7,829

Languages
  - Official: Kannada
- Time zone: UTC+5:30 (IST)

Ulugulli is a village in the southern state of Karnataka, India. It is located in the Somvarpet taluk of Kodagu district.

== Demographics ==
As of 2011 India census, Ulugulli had a population of 7829 with 3859 males and 3970 females.

== See also ==
- Kodagu
- Mangalore
- Districts of Karnataka
