= Ponnani Juma Masjid =

Mosque in Kerala, India

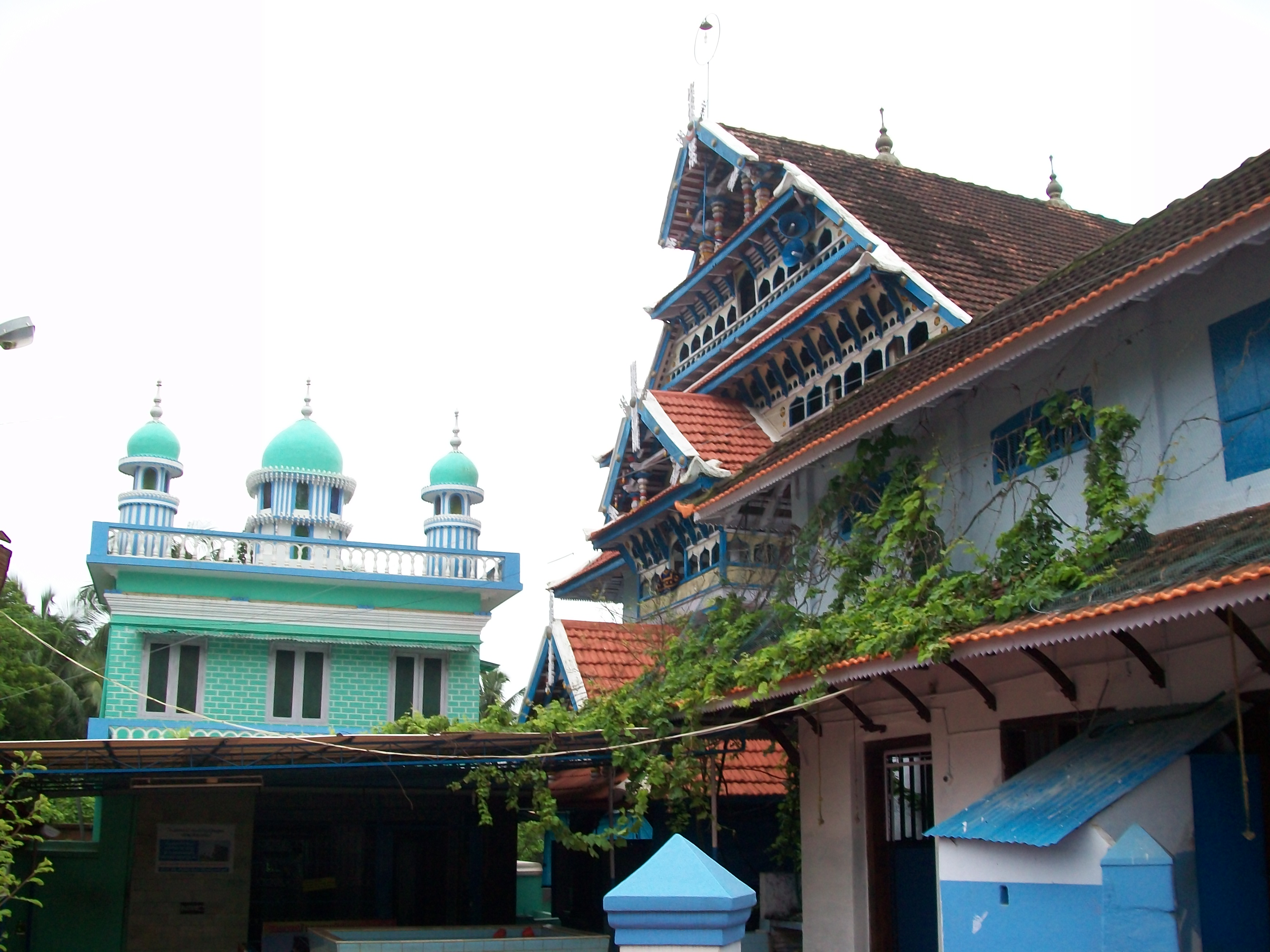
- The mosque in 2010

- Location of the mosque in Kerala

Religion
- Affiliation: Islam
- Ecclesiastical or organisational status: Mosque
- Status: Active

Location
- Location: Ponnani, Malappuram district, Kerala
- Country: India
- Coordinates: 10°46′44″N 75°55′24″E

Architecture
- Type: Mosque architecture
- Style: Kerala-Islamic
- Founder: Zainuddin Ibn Ali Ibn Ahamed Maabari
- Completed: 925 AH (1518/1520 CE)

Specifications
- Length: 27 m (90 ft)
- Width: 18 m (60 ft)

The Ponnani Juma Masjid, also known as the Ponnani Valiya Jumath Palli, is a Friday mosque, located in Ponnani, in the Malappuram district of the state of Kerala, India. The Juma Masjid played an important role in the intellectual field of Ponnani, once referred to as the 'Little Mecca' of Malabar. At that time, the mosque was also the headquarters of those seeking knowledge in Ponnani. The mosque grounds include a madrasa.

== History ==
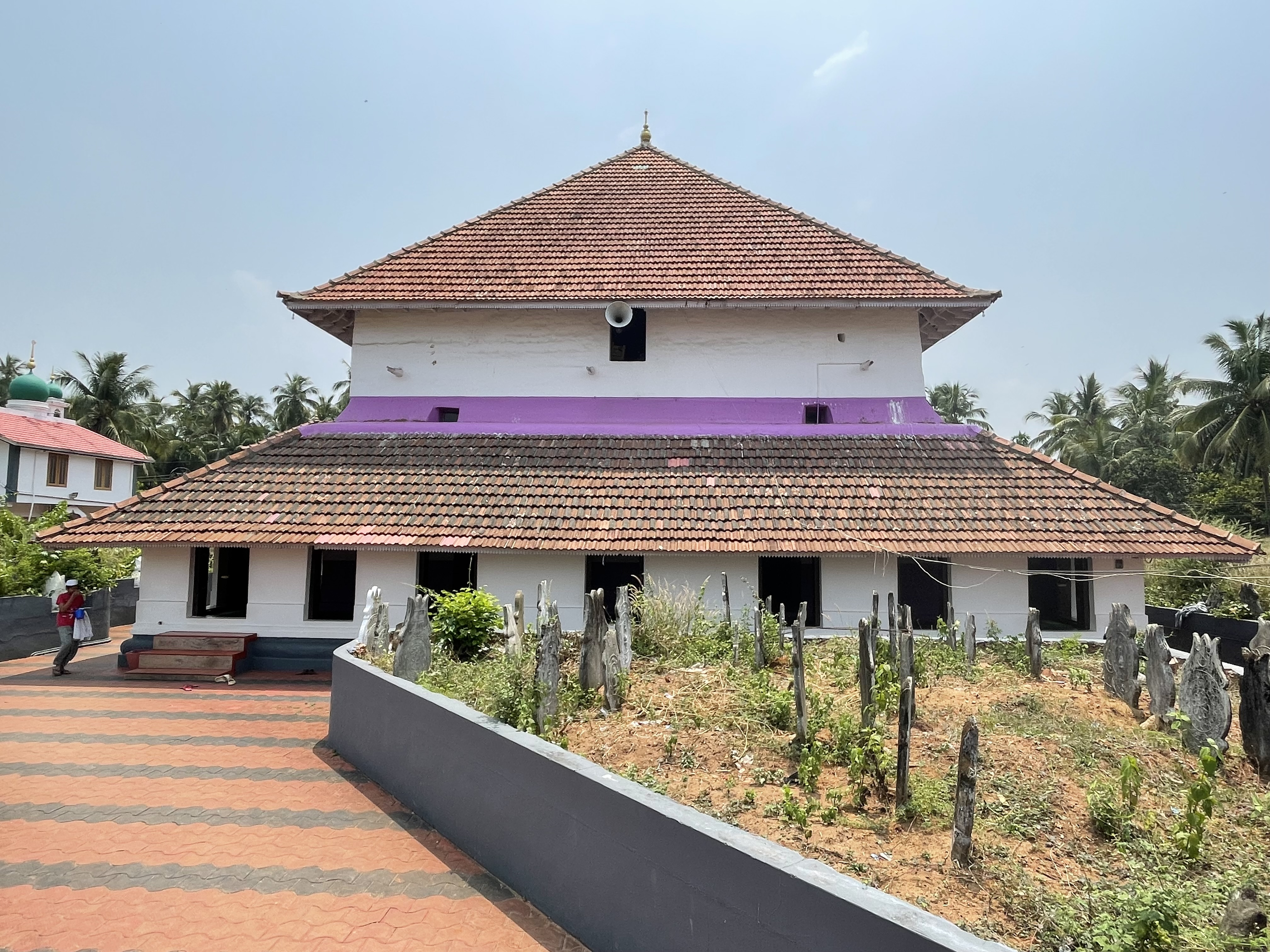
A view of the rear of the mosque, in 2022

William Logan recorded in the second part of his Malabar Manual that the Ponnani Grand Juma Masjid was built by Sheikh Zainuddin Ibn Ali Ibn Ahamed Maabari in 925 AH (1518/1520 CE). Sheikh Zainuddin, also known as the great Zainuddin Makhdoom, died in July 1522 and it is believed that the construction of the mosque, completed in the Kerala-Islamic style, was completed before his death. The interior of the Ponnani Grand Juma Masjid is 27 metres (90 ft) long and 18 metres (60 ft) wide.

After the construction of the mosque, Sheikh Zainuddin Makhdoom himself started teaching there; believed to be the beginning of the Pallidars system in Malabar.

== Sitting before wick lamp ==
There was a tradition to sit around the oil lamp installed inside the mosque, study religion and get the Musliar status from Makhdoom. For this, students used to come from all over Malabar. The way you sit around the oil lamp and get the Musliar status is called 'Sitting before wick lamp'.

Logan's Malabar Manual records that in 1887, approximately 400 people came from the other lands and studied at the Ponnani Grand Masjid. Among those who were close to the mosque were Kunjayan Muslyar, a native of North Malabar who lived 200 years ago, and author of 'Noolmuhammad' and 'Kappapat', Umer Khazi, the poet and brave man who fought against British rule. Mamburam Thangal was a visitor to the mosque.

== See also ==
- Islam in India
- List of mosques in India
- List of mosques in Kerala
