= Kunjali Marakkar =

Fleet admiral of the Samoothiri

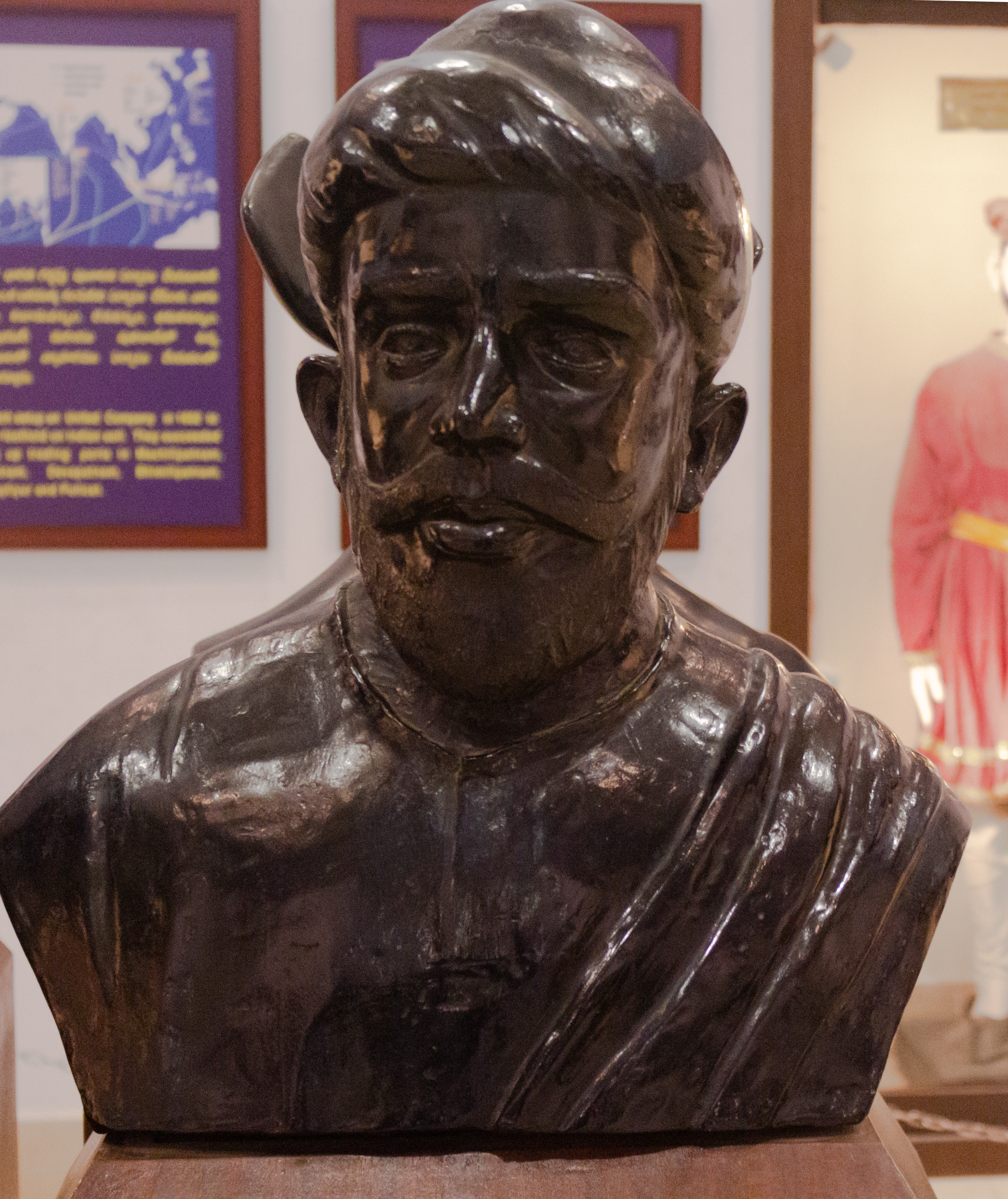
Bust of the third Kunjali Marakkar at Visakha Museum, Andhra Pradesh.

Kunjali Marakkar was the title inherited by the Admiral of the fleet of the King Samoothiri / Zamorin, the King of Calicut, in present-day Kerala, India. There were four Marakkars whose war tactics defended against the Portuguese invasion from 1520 to 1600. The Kunjali Marakkars are credited with organizing the first naval defense of the Indian coast. Indian Navy commissioned INS Kunjali in their memory on 11 July 1954, with Captain Michael Benjamin Samuel, VSM, as the first Commanding Officer.

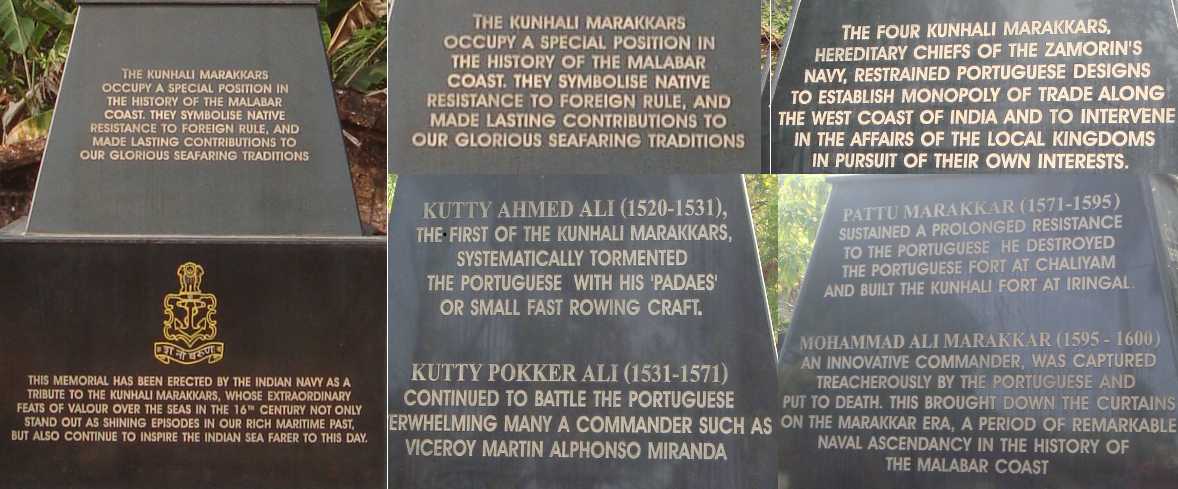
Inscriptions on the Kunjali Marakkar Memorial at Kottakkal, Vatakara

== Origins of Marakkar ==
The Marakkars originate from a branch of Arab merchants within the seafaring community who settled in Kochi. They were involved in trade and engaged in collaboration with the Portuguese. The 16th century writer Zainuddin Makhdoom II who wrote the Tuhfat-ul-Mujahideen stated in 1524 that the Marakkars had turned against the Portuguese when the latter disrupted the former's trade networks by purchasing spices and commodities directly from local people in Kochi.

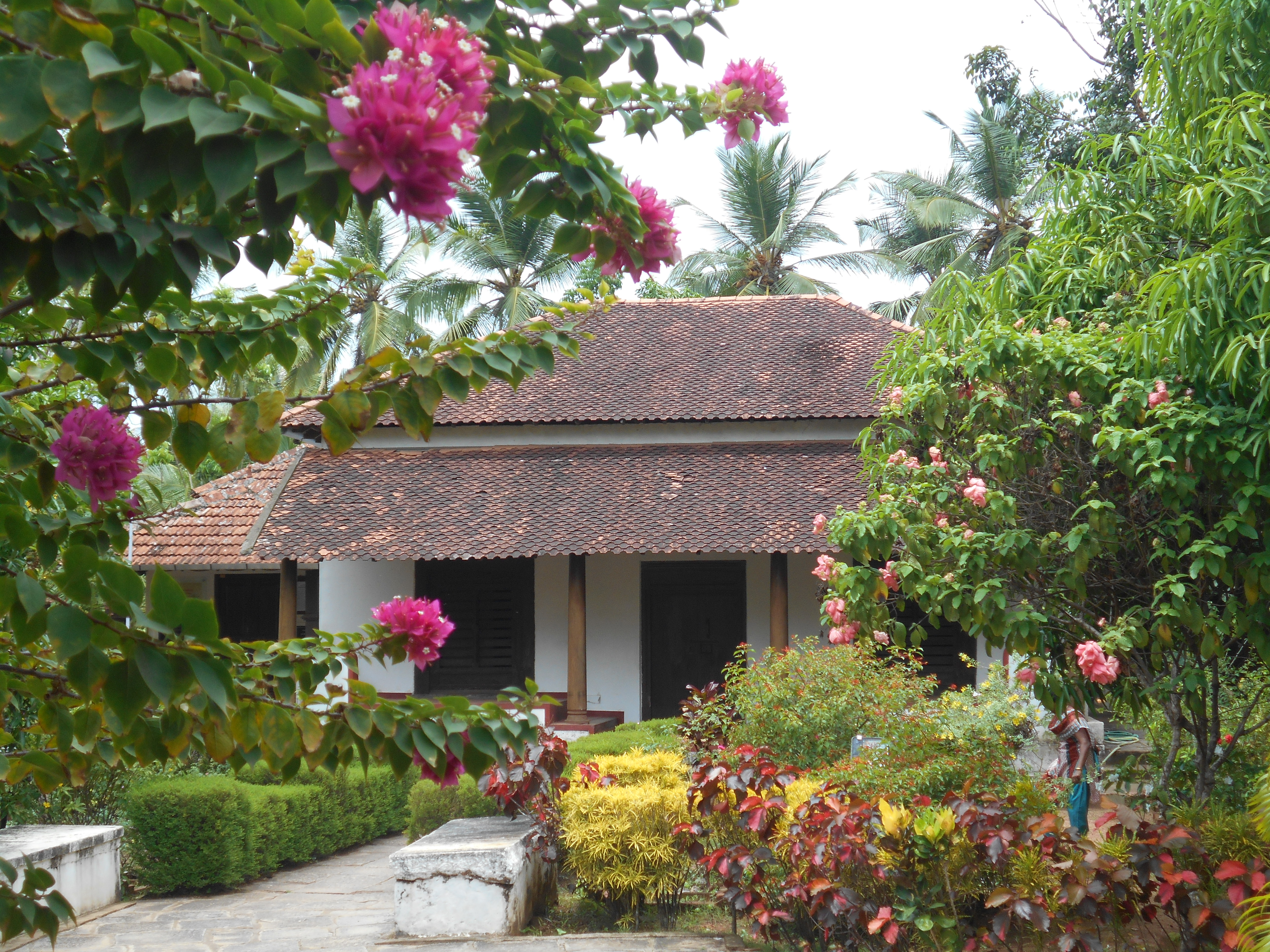
Ancestral home of Kunjali Marakkar at Iringal, Kottakkal, near Calicut, now preserved as a Museum.

== Kunjali Marakkar I ==
Kutty Ahmed Ali was an Admiral of Zamorin he played a significant role in resisting the Portuguese expansion. In 1524 Zamorin Kingdom helped the Ceylonese king in his campaign to expel the Portuguese from Ceylon and reduced the Colombo Fort with the help of Zamorin navy under the command of Ahmed Ali. In 1525 Portuguese established a fortress in Calicut a fleet of Zamorin ships under the command of Kutty Ahmed Ali bombarded the fort. later that year entered the port of Cochin setting fire to number of Portuguese vessels and returned safely to Calicut. In 1529 Zamorin navy defeated Portuguese navy in the battle of chetwai river.

== Against the Portuguese Empire ==
The Kunjali IV had rescued a Chinese boy, called Chinali, who was said to have been enslaved on a Portuguese ship. The Kunjali was very fond of him, and he became one of his most feared lieutenants, a Muslim and enemy of the Portuguese. The Portuguese were terrorized by the Kunjali and his Chinese right-hand man. Eventually, after the Portuguese allied with Calicut's Zamorin, under André Furtado de Mendonça when Kunjali Marrikar openly challenged the Zamorin by cutting off the tail of the Zamorin's elephant and assaulting a Nair noble and his wife who had been sent to get an explanation of the deed. The allies attacked the Kunjali and Chinali's forces, the first battle ended in disaster for the allies due to lack of communication. The second battle was well co-ordinated with the Portuguese attacking Marakkar kotta from the sea and the Zamorin from the land. Marakkar surrendered to the Zamorin after receiving a solemn promise of pardon but the Zamorin handed them over to the Portuguese.

Diogo do Couto, a Portuguese historian, questioned the Kunjali and Chinali when they were captured. He was present when the Kunjali surrendered to the Portuguese and was described: "One of these was Chinale, a Chinese, who had been a servant at Malacca, and said to have been the captive of a Portuguese, taken as a boy from a fusta, and afterwards brought to Kunjali, who conceived such an affection for him that he trusted him with everything. He was the greatest exponent of the Moorish superstition and enemy of the Christians in all Malabar, and for those taken captive at sea and brought thither he invented the most exquisite kinds of torture when he martyred them." However, de Couto's claim that he tortured Christians was questionable, since no other source reported this, and is dismissed as ridiculous.

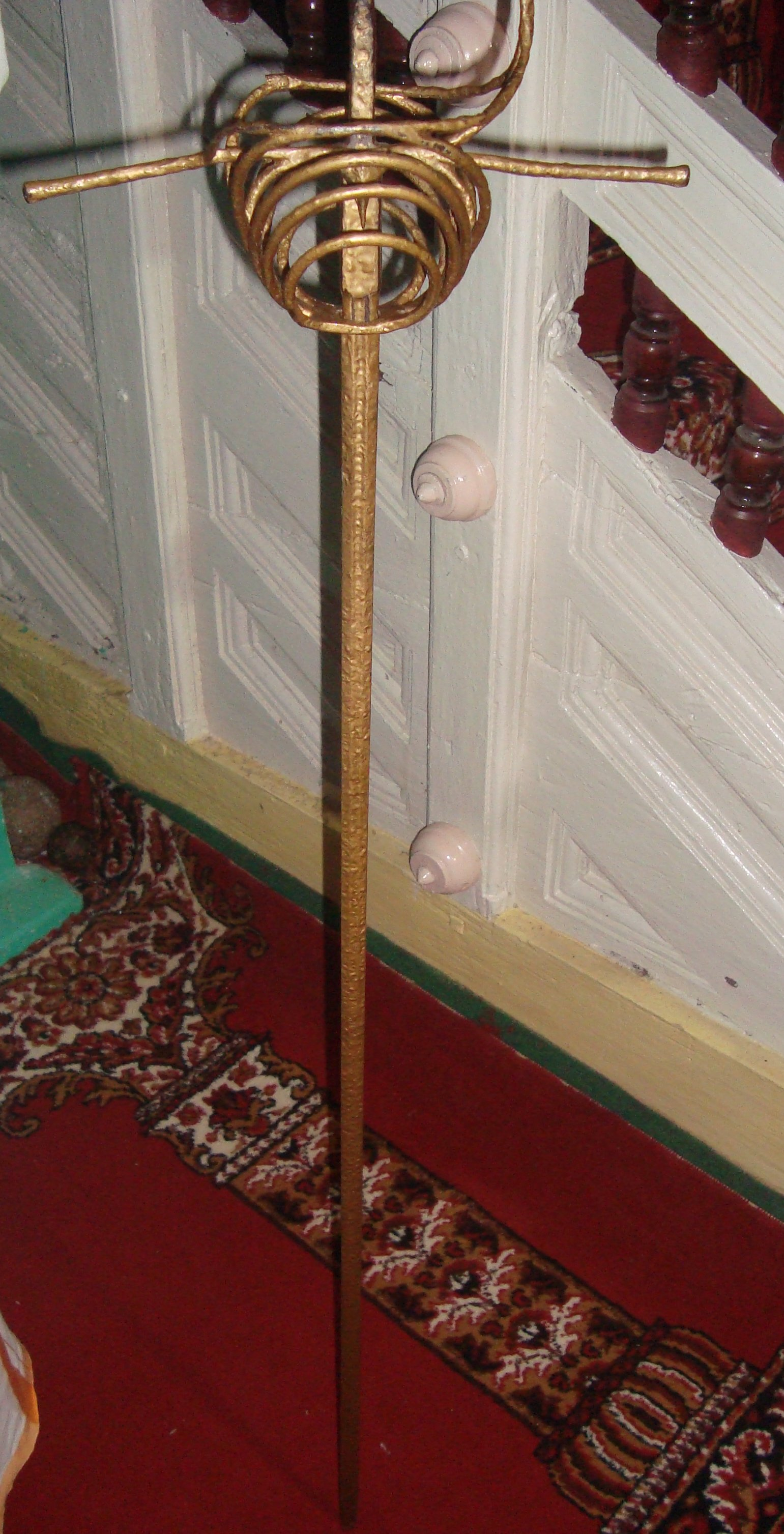
The sword used by the last Kunjali Marakkar at the mosque at Kottakkal, Vatakara

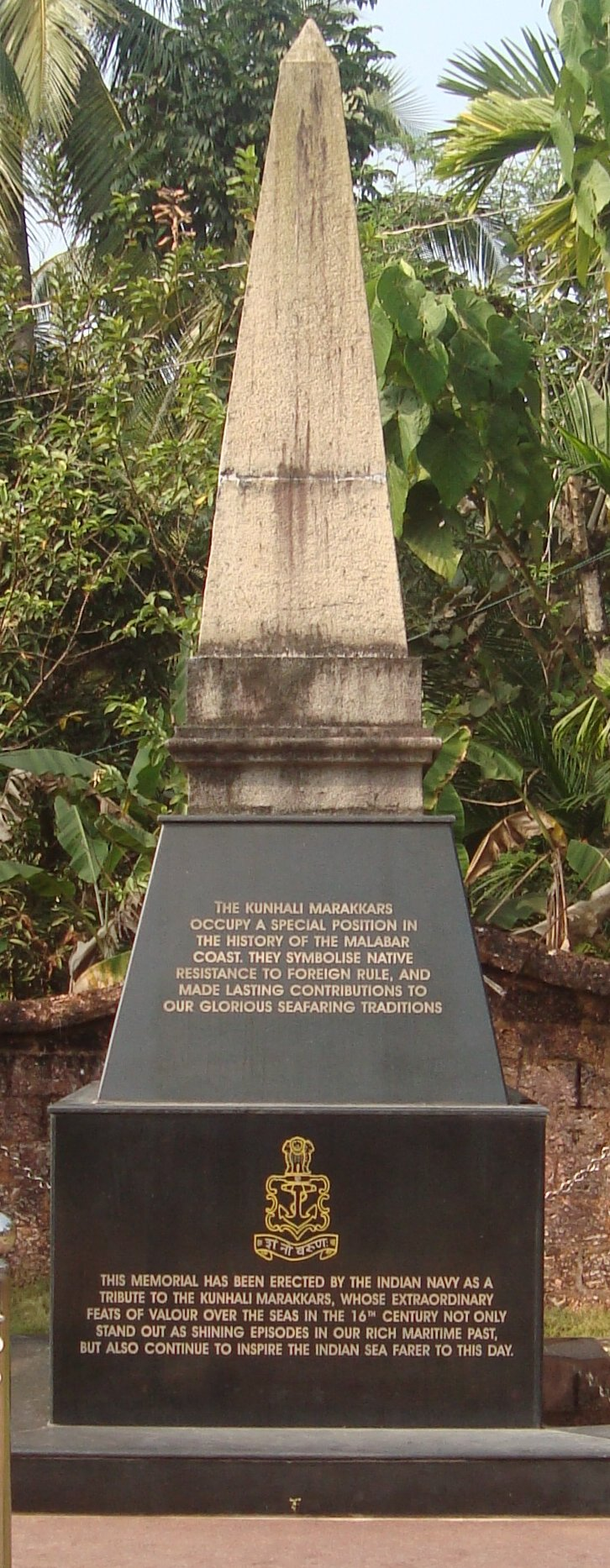
The Kunjali Marakkar Memorial erected by the Indian navy at Kottakkal, Vatakar

== Marakkar Kotta ==
Such a practice also prevailed in Calicut, registering the goods, Pyrard called the system "most admirable". Malabar pirates had four harbours under the ambit of the Samoothiri, there they built their galleys. These harbours were Moutingue (Muttungal), Badara (Vadakara), Chombaye (Chambal), and Cangelotte (Kaniyaram Kottu). They were fortified only on the seas-side under the patronage of Samoothiri, who granted these ports to Marakkar family who fortified them. These ports were two leagues from each other. Portuguese made multiple attempts to conquer these fortified ports, without effect or to their own loss, mainly at Badara.

== Legacy ==
- There is a temple dedicated to "Kunjali Maraikkayar" at Madhavan Kurichi village in Thoothukudi district of Tamil Nadu. Known as perumal temple, it is situated near to Manapad which was a Portuguese stronghold in the 16th century. Villagers worship Maraikkayar as a deity and observe annual festivals. Stories of Maraikkayar are part of their Villu Paatu songs.
- At Iringal, a village about 35 km north of Kozhikode, a small museum has been built in a hut that used to belong to the Marakkar family, with collection of ancient swords, cannonballs and knives. This is maintained by the State Archeology Dept.
- The Kunjali Marakkar Centre for West Asian Studies at Calicut University is named in honour of Kunjali Marakkar.

== Popular culture ==
- In 1967, S. S. Rajan made the Malayalam film Kunjali Marakkar starring Kottarakkara Sreedharan Nair in the title role. The film won the National Film Award for Best Feature Film in Malayalam.
- Marakkar: Lion of the Arabian Sea, a film made by director Priyadarshan starring Mohanlal won the 50th Kerala State Film Awards and 67th National Film Awards. Apart from using real characters the story of the film is fictional.

== See also ==
- Tuhfat Ul Mujahideen
- Mayimama Marakkar
