= Zainuddin Makhdoom I =

Islamic scholar (died 1522)

Sheikh Zainuddin Makhdoom bin Sheikh Al Qazi Ali
- Died: 1522; Ponnani
- Burial place: Ponnani Juma Masjid, Ponnani
- Education: Al Azhar University, Egypt
- Occupations: Islamic scholar, author
- Known for: Author of al-Ajwibah al-'ajibah 'an al-as'ilah al-gharibah
- Notable work: Tahrid: Ahlil Iman Ala Jihadi Abdati Sulban
- Title: المخدوم الأوّل
- Parent: Sheikh Ali Ahmed Al Ma’abari (father)

Sheikh Zainuddin Makhdoom bin Sheikh Al Qazi Ali (Arabic: شيخ زين الدين المخدوم بن الشيخ عبد العزيز المليباري; Zayn al-Dīn ibn ʻAbd al-ʻAzīz Malībārī), was an Islamic scholar and grandfather of Zainuddin Makhdoom II. He is the builder of Ponnani Juma Masjid.

== Books ==
- Makhdoom I, Zainuddin (2013). Tahrid: Ahlil Iman Ala Jihadi Abdati Sulban (in Arabic). Translated by Mohammed, Dr. K.M. Kozhikode: Other Books. ISBN 9789380081403.
- Malibari, Zayn al-Din ibn 'Abd al-'Aziz (2012). al-Ajwibah al-'ajibah 'an al-as'ilah al-gharibah (in Arabic). Kuwait: Dar Aldeyaa lil-Nahsr wa-al-Tawzi'.

== See also ==
- Makhdoom
- Zainuddin Makhdoom II
