= Ossan =

Community status muslim group in Kerala

Ossan is a community/status group of Muslims in Kerala, south India. The Ossan men were the traditional circumcisers among the Muslims of the central Malabar Coast (northern Kerala). The Ossan women were experts in pre- and post-delivery care of pregnant women (midwifery).

It is speculated that the original form of the title Ossan is "Otthaan", derived from the Arabic word Khatthaan meaning an expert practitioner of circumcision.

The Ossans were formerly considered a low status group among the Muslims of Kerala. Ossan community is still figured as a financially backward group among some of the Muslim families in Kerala. Matrimonial alliances with financially elite Muslim families are rare in some parts of Kerala.However, many families had marital relationships with them and they have got popular family names across Kerala than Ossan.
