= Kodava Maaple =

Muslim community located in southern India

Regions with significant populations
- Kodagu (Coorg)

Languages
- Kodava takk, payakko or payakamMalayalam

Related ethnic groups
- Kodavas, Amma Kodava, Kodagu Heggade, Kodagu Gowda, Beary, Mappila

The Kodava Maaple, also known as Jamma Maaple, is a Muslim community residing in Kodagu district of Karnataka in southern India. They are Sunnis of the Shafi'i school of thought (madhab), and contract marriage alliances with Mappilas and Bearys. They speak Kodava takk, although now they do follow some Mappila and Beary customs also.

== History ==
The Madikeri the capital taluk of Kodagu had been renamed to Zafarabad by the Sultan in the meanwhile. The Muslim descendants of the Kodavas who converted into Islam, after Tipu Sultan's army on various forays into Coorg are called Kodava Mappila.
