= Zainuddin Makhdoom II =

Indian judge

Sheikh Ahmad Zainuddin Makhdoom
- Born: 1531 (938 AH); Chombala (Azhiyoor, Calicut District, Kerala State), near Mahé, present day India.
- Died: 1583
- Occupations: Qadi and Writer
- Known for: Islamic jurisprudent, author of Fat'h Ul Mueen and Tuhafat Ul Mujahideen
- Notable work: Tuhfat Ul Mujahideen
- Title: Qadi of Chombal
- Predecessor: Sheikh Muhammad Al Ghazzali
- Father: Sheikh Muhammad Al Ghazzali bin Sheikh Zainuddin bin Sheikh Ali bin Sheikh Ahmad Ma'bari

Sheikh Ahmad Zainuddin bin Muhammad al-Ghazzali (Arabic: شيخ احمد زين الدين بن شيخ محمد غزالي; Ahmad Zayn al-Din ibn Muhammad al-Ghazāli al-Malibári), grandson of Sheikh Zainuddin Makhdoom I, was the writer, orator, historian, jurisprudent and spiritual leader and widely known as Zainuddin Makhdoom Second or Zaniudeen Makhdoom Al Sageer (زين الدين المخدوم الصغير) whose family originated from Tarim in Hadhramaut of Yemen. He inherited the legacy of his grandfather and was installed as the Chief Qadi (judge) in the locality of Ponnani, Kerala, India, as well as appointed as the Chief Müderris (head teacher) in the historic Ponnani Dars at Ponnani Jum'ah Masjid, that built by Zainuddin Makhdoom I.

== Early life ==
He was born to the Makhdoom family in the early months of Hijra 938 (c. 1531 CE) at Chombala (Azhiyoor Panchayath, Calicut District, Kerala State, India) Near Mahe, and received religious instruction under the supervision of his grandfather. He completed his primary education under his father Muhammed Ghazzali and his uncle Abdul Azeez Bin Sheikh Makhdoom Al Awwal ( عبد العزيز بن شيخ مخدوم الآول) and left for Makah for further study. He performed the Haj and settled there for ten years imbibing Islamic knowledge from exponents of Islamic law and other branches of knowledge. He received the guidance of famous scholars such as Al Hafiz Shihabuddeen bin Al Hajr Al Haithemi (الحافظ شهاب الدين بن الحجر الهيتمي), Grand Mufti of Haramain (chief jurisprudent of Makah and Madina) and commentator in Hadeeth and Fiqh, Izzuddeen bin Abdul Azeez al Zamzami (عز الدين بن عبد العزيز الزمزمي), Shiekh Abdul Rahman bin Ziyad (شيخ عبد الرحمن بن زياد) and Sayyid Abdul Rahman Al Safwi (سيد عبد الرحمن الصفوي). He gained the Tassawwuf (Sufi spiritual knowledge) from Kutub Zaban Zain Ul Arifeen Muhammed Bin Sheikh Ul Arif Abu Hasan Al Bakri (قطب الزمان زين العارفين محمد بن شيخ العارف ابو حسن البكري) and was honored with eleven Khirkath (خرقة), symbol of grade in Tareeqath. Within a short period he was hailed as the Sheikh of Qadriya Tareeqath.

== In the field of service ==
After the decade-long stay in Makkah, he returned to Kerala and took charge as chief Mufti in the grand Masjid of Ponnani, a position he occupied for thirty-six years. A historian recorded that his mentor Ibn Hajar Hithami had come to Ponnani and stayed there for a short period. It is said that the famous lamp made of stone, presented by Ibn Hajar Hithami, is still kept in Ponnani Dars.

=== As the freedom fighter ===
He did not limit himself to work as a cleric, but made many significant intervention in the political arena, keeping warm relations with the major political figures in that period. He lived during the regime of Akbar of the Mughal Empire and had a good relationship with Sultan Ali Adil Shah I, Sultan of Bijapur, as well as the Zamorin of Calicut. He was a strident advocate of freedom struggles against the imperialist power of Portugal, and motivated the youth to take part in the special army of Zamorin to defend against them. In his masterpiece Tufathul Mujahideen Fi Akhbar ul Burthugalin, he narrated the brutality of the Portuguese on the Malabar soil with special reference to their anti-Muslim stance. He used to instil in Muslim youth the necessity of holy war and the inevitability of military action against the Portuguese. In the aforementioned text, he motivated them by exuding the endless promises of the Almighty for those who waged war against them, and boosted their morale by leading their mind to the sweet memories of the golden age of Islam.

== Books by Makhdoom II ==
He was known for his unique command in writing in variety of subjects which includes jurisprudence, history, spirituality as well as other subjects which were distinct from other writers. The following table gives an overview of his works.

Transliterated Title	Original Title	Translated Title	Notes
Tuḥfat al-mujāhidīn fī baʿḍ akhbār al-burtughāliyyīn	Arabic: تحفة المجاهدين في بعض أخبار البرتغاليين	Gift of the Mujahidin: Some Accounts of the Portuguese	History of Muslims in Kerala with special reference to the brutalities of the Portuguese invasion
Fatḥ al-muʿīn sharḥ qurrat al-ʿayn	Arabic: فتح المعين شرح قرة العين	Opening of the Aide: A Commentary on Qurrat al-ʿAyn	Exemplary text on Jurisprudence based on the Shafi'i school of thought; annotation on his own text Kurratul Ain. Taught in some of the most renowned Islamic Universities such as Al Azhar, Egypt.
Qurrat al-ʿayn bi-muhimmāt al-dīn	Arabic: قرة العين بمهمات الدين	Delight of the Eyes: On the Foundations of the Faith	Precise text on jurisprudence based on the Shafi school of thought
Irshād al-ʿibād ilā sabīl al-rashād	Arabic: إرشاد العباد الى سبيل الرشاد	Guiding God's Servants to the Best Course of Action	Spiritual text explaining the way to the Almighty
Iḥkām aḥkām al-nikāḥ	Arabic: إحكام أحكام النكاح	A Consolidation of the Rulings on Marriage	Precise explanation of the laws relating to marriage
Sharḥ al-ṣudūr fī aḥwāl al-mawtā wa-l-qubūr	Arabic: شرح الصدور في أحوال الموتى والقبور	Widening the Chest: On the Conditions of the Dead and Graves	Spiritual text explaining the context of the afterworld; it was an annotation of the work done by Sooyoothi (السيوطي)
al-Ajwibah al-ʿajībah ʿan al-asʾilah al-gharībah	Arabic: الأجوبة العجيبة عن الأسئلة الغريبة	Wonderful Answers to Rare Questions	Collection of decrees issued on various issues
al-Fatāwā al-Hindiyyah	Arabic: الفتاوى الهندية	The Indian Fatwas	Decree issued on the special context of southern Indian state of Kerala
al-Jawāhir fī ʿuqūbat ahl al-kabāʾir	Arabic: الجواهر في عقوبة أهل الكبائر	Gems: On the Punishments for Grave Sinners	Spiritual text explaining the consequences for criminals
al-Manhaj al-wāḍiḥ	Arabic: المنهج الواضح	The Clear Program	Text explaining laws relating to marriage
al-Istiʿdād li-l-mawt wa-suʾāl al-qabr	Arabic: الاستعداد للموت وسؤال القبر	Preparing for Death and the Questions of the Grave	

== Demise ==
He died of natural causes in 1583 and was laid to rest in Kunjhippalli (Near Mahe, Azhiyoor Grama panchayath, Calicut District, Kerala, India). His Qabr (maqbara) lies under a tree in his native Chompala(Azhiyoor Panchayath).
