= Islam in Kerala =

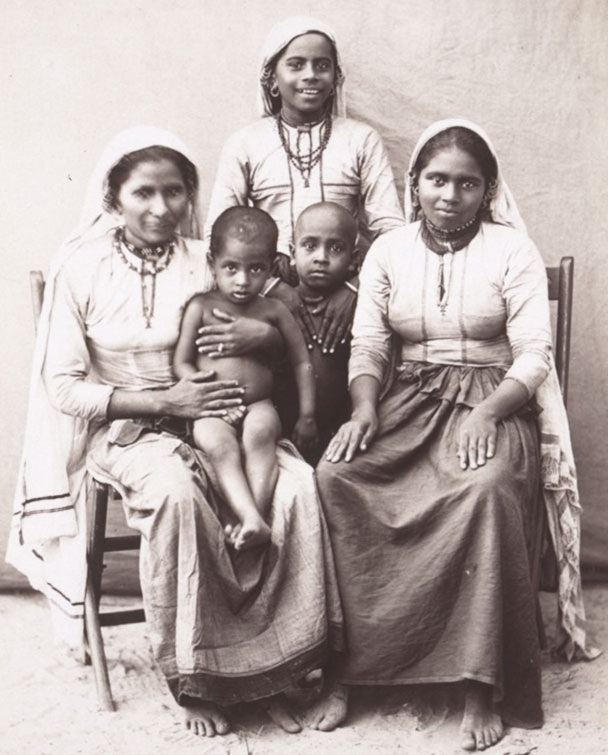
- Muslim women of Kerala (1901)

Total population
- c. 9 million (26.56%) in 2011

Regions with significant populations
- Kerala, Lakshadweep, States of Persian Gulf, Europe, Tulu Nadu, Kodagu, Nilgiris, Malaysia, Singapore

Religions
- Islam

Languages
- Malayalam, Arabi Malayalam

Islam arrived in Kerala, the Malayalam-speaking region in the south-western tip of India, through Middle Eastern merchants. The Indian coast has an ancient relation with West Asia and the Middle East, even during the pre-Islamic period.

Kerala Muslims or Malayali Muslims from north Kerala are generally referred to as Mappilas. Mappilas are but one among the many communities that forms the Muslim population of Kerala. According to historian M. G. S. Narayanan and other scholars, the early members of Muslim Mappila community originated from the descendants of children born to non-Muslim Arab traders and native women along the Malabar coast, before Islam. These early individuals were referred to as ma-ppila, as they did not belong to any existing caste group. Arab traders often stayed on the Malabar coast for extended periods, sometimes up to three months, while waiting for the reverse monsoon winds, during which some formed temporary relationships with local women, often in exchange for money. The offspring of such unions were not accepted into any Hindu caste and came to be known as ma-ppila.

After the rise of Islam in Arabia, many among these Mappilas embraced the new faith. However, the majority of present-day Mappilas estimated to constitute around 90 percent are considered descendants of lower-caste Hindus, mainly Dalits, who converted to Islam at a later stage to escape caste based oppression. Conversion to non-Hindu religions offered them social freedom, as the Brahmanical order did not define how such converts should be treated. Scholars note that these conversions were motivated primarily by the desire for social emancipation rather than by theological comparison between the Bhagavad Gita and the Qur’an.

Even after India’s independence, the practice known as Arabikalyanam (“Arab marriage”) remained prevalent in the districts of Kasaragod, Kannur, Kozhikode, and Malappuram, where visiting Arabs offered money or wealth in exchange for temporary marriages with Mappila women. Several Mappila families in Kozhikode and Malappuram accumulated considerable wealth through these arrangements. As per some studies, the term "Mappila" denotes not a single community but a variety of Malayali Muslims from Kerala (former Malabar District) of different origins. Some were called 'Moors' in Kasargod district. Unlike the common misconception, the caste system does exist among the Muslims of Kerala. Muslims in Malabar are also known as Jonakar (similar to Tamil name – சோனகர், Cōṉakar – for Sri Lankan Moors), Koya, and Kaka (meaning “crow,” referring to its characteristics). During the colonial period, an unusual practice called Hal-ilakkam (running amok) was reportedly common among the Mappilas of Malappuram, in which a priest would select a mentally disturbed or emotionally vulnerable person, such as someone whose wife had been abducted, to incite him into attacking non-Muslims as a means of regaining his lost honour. This practice is described in detail by Lance Corporal Vincent J. Ryder of the Cheshire Regiment, in his 1907 book 'Two Years in Malabar'. The Muslims of Southern and Central Kerala or the erstwhile Kingdom of Travancore are known as Methanmar and Rowthers.

Muslims in Kerala share a common language (Malayalam) with the rest of the non-Muslim population and have a culture commonly regarded as the Malayali culture. Most of the Muslims in Kerala follow Sunni Islam of Shāfiʿī School of thought. Kerala's Muslim community has a higher Total Fertility Rate (TFR) compared to other religious groups in the state, with a TFR of 2.25, nearly double that of other religious groups in Kerala. If a typical Hindu family has 2 children, a typical Muslim family in Kerala, based on the TFR ratio, would have around 3 children.

== History ==
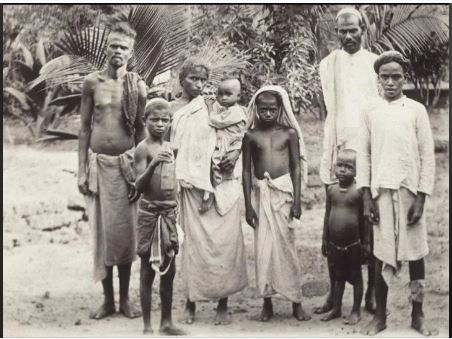
Mappilas of Malabar 1914

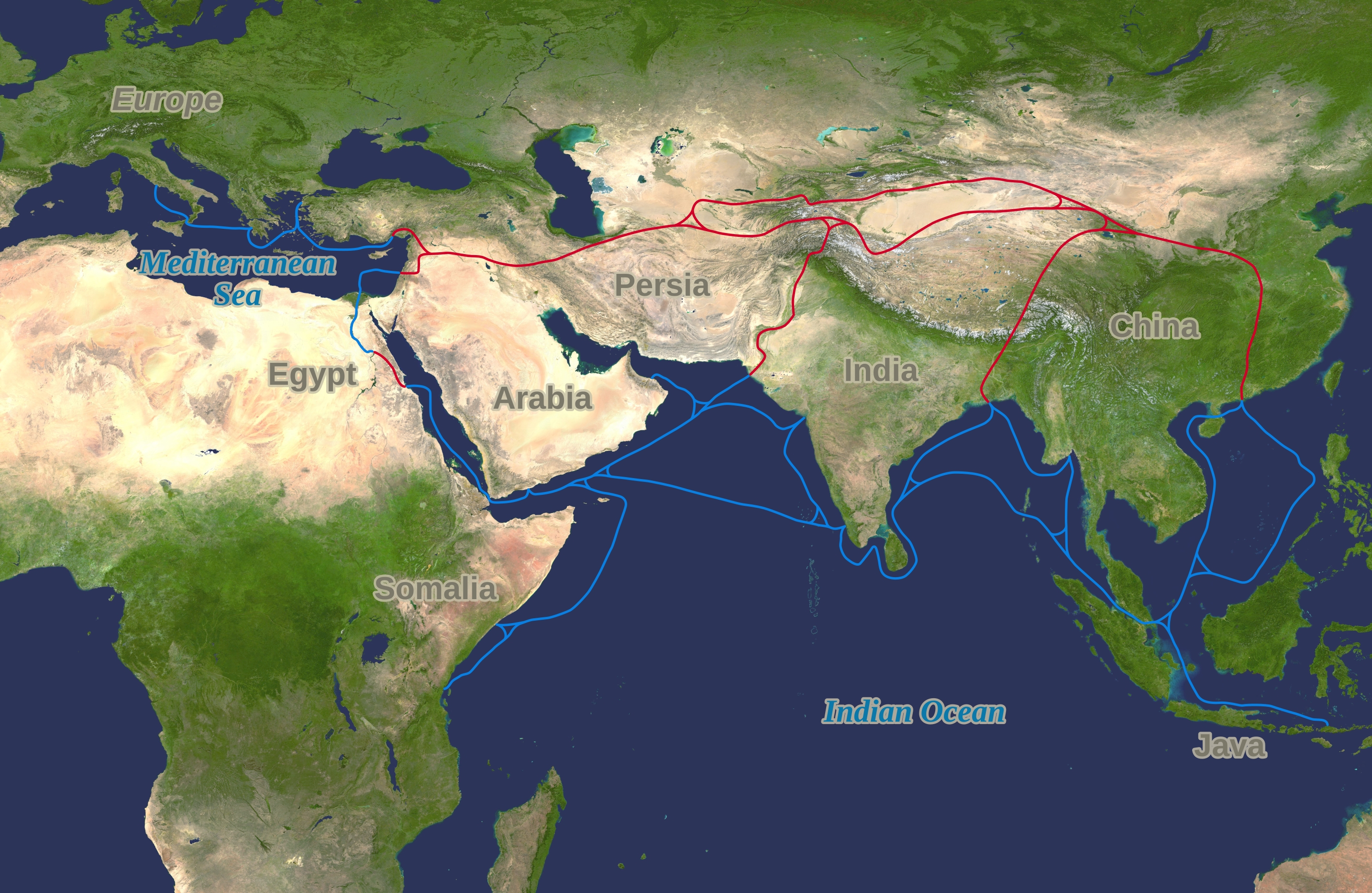
Silk Road trade routes. The spice trade was mainly by water (blue).

Names, routes and locations of the Periplus of the Erythraean Sea (1st century CE)

Kerala has been a major spice exporter since 3000 BCE, according to Sumerian records and it is still referred to as the "Garden of Spices" or as the "Spice Garden of India". Kerala's spices attracted ancient Arabs, Babylonians, Assyrians and Egyptians to the Malabar Coast in the 3rd and 2nd millennia BCE. Phoenicians established trade with Kerala during this period. Arabs and Phoenicians were the first to enter Malabar Coast to trade Spices. The Arabs on the coasts of Yemen, Oman, and the Persian Gulf, must have made the first long voyage to Kerala and other eastern countries. They must have brought the Cinnamon of Kerala to the Middle East. The Greek historian Herodotus (5th century BCE) records that in his time the cinnamon spice industry was monopolized by the Egyptians and the Phoenicians.

In the past, there were many Muslim traders in the ports of Malabar. There had been considerable trade relations between Middle East and Malabar Coast even before the time of Muhammad (c. 570 – 632 AD). Muslim tombstones with ancient dates, short inscriptions in medieval mosques, and rare Arab coin collections are the major sources of early Muslim presence on the Malabar Coast. Islam arrived in Kerala, a part of the larger Indian Ocean rim, via spice and silk traders from the Middle East. Historians do not rule out the possibility of Islam being introduced to Kerala as early as the seventh century CE. Notable has been the occurrence of Cheraman Perumal Tajuddin, the Hindu King that moved to Arabia to meet the Islamic prophet Muhammad and converted to Islam. Kerala Muslims are generally referred to as the Mappilas. Mappilas are but one among the many communities that forms the Muslim population of Kerala. According to the Legend of Cheraman Perumals, the first Indian mosque was built in 624 AD at Kodungallur with the mandate of the last the ruler (the Cheraman Perumal) of Chera dynasty, who converted to Islam during the lifetime of Muhammad (c. 570–632). According to Qissat Shakarwati Farmad, the Masjids at Kodungallur, Kollam, Madayi, Barkur, Mangalore, Kasaragod, Kannur, Dharmadam, Panthalayini, and Chaliyam, were built during the era of Malik Dinar, and they are among the oldest Masjids in Indian subcontinent. It is believed that Malik Dinar died at Thalangara in Kasaragod town. According to popular tradition, Islam was brought to Lakshadweep islands, situated just to the west of Malabar Coast, by Ubaidullah in 661 CE. His grave is believed to be located on the island of Andrott. A few Umayyad (661–750 AD) coins were discovered from Kothamangalam in the eastern part of Ernakulam district.

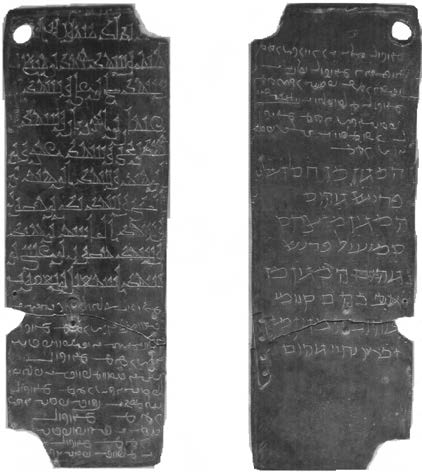
The earliest major epigraphic evidence of Muslim merchants in Kerala is the Quilon Syrian copper plates (9th century AD)

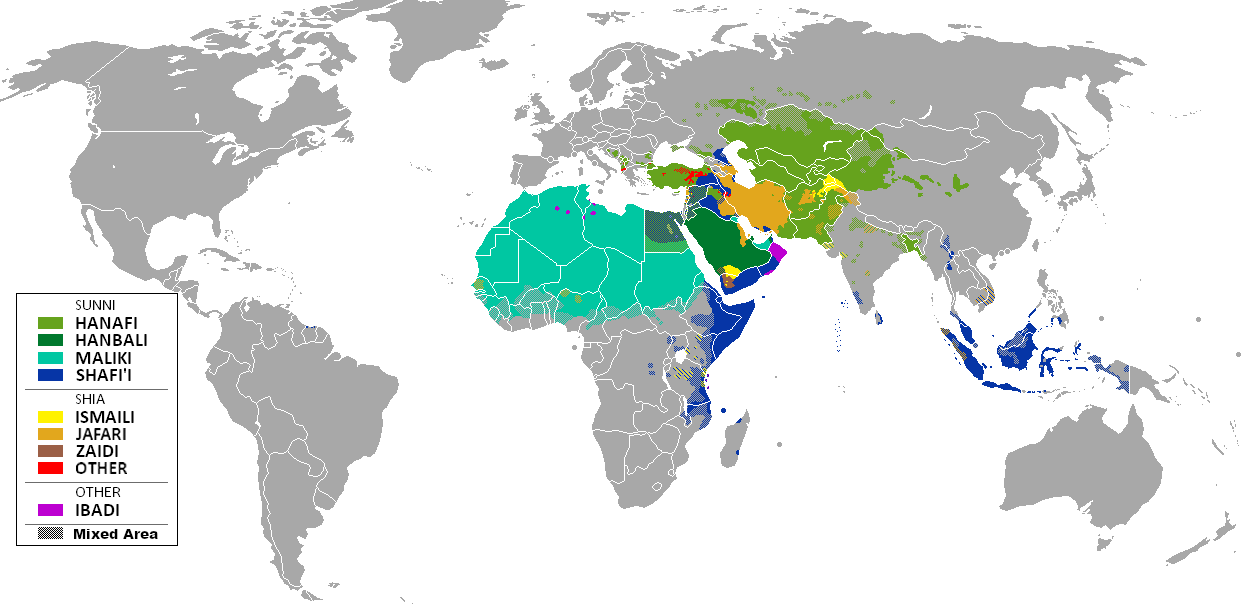
Shafiʽi school (shaded in dark blue) is the most-prominent school among the Muslims of Kerala, coastal Karnataka, and Sri Lanka unlike from rest of South Asia

The known earliest mention about Muslims of Kerala is in the Quilon Syrian copper plates of 9th century CE, granted by the ruler of Kollam. A number of foreign accounts have mentioned about the presence of considerable Muslim population in the Malabar Coast. Arab writers such as Al-Masudi of Baghdad (896–956 AD), Muhammad al-Idrisi (1100–1165 AD), Abulfeda (1273–1331 AD), and Al-Dimashqi (1256–1327 AD) mention the Muslim communities in Kerala. Some historians assume that the Mappilas can be considered as the first native, settled Muslim community in South Asia. Al-Biruni (973–1048 CE) appears to be the first writer to call Malabar Coast as Malabar. Authors such as Ibn Khordadbeh and Al-Baladhuri mention Malabar ports in their works. The Arab writers had called this place Malibar, Manibar, Mulibar, and Munibar. Malabar is reminiscent of the word Malanad which means the land of hills. According to William Logan, the word Malabar comes from a combination of the Dravidian word Mala (hill) and the Persian/Arabic word Barr (country/continent). The Kodungallur Mosque, has a granite foundation exhibiting 11th–12th century architectural style. The Arabic inscription on a copper slab within the Madayi Mosque in Kannur records its foundation year as 1124 CE.

The monopoly of overseas spice trade from Malabar Coast was safe with the West Asian shipping magnates of Kerala ports. The Muslims were a major financial power to be reckoned with in the kingdoms of Kerala and had great political influence in the Hindu royal courts. Travellers have recorded the considerably huge presence of Muslim merchants and settlements of sojourning traders in most of the ports of Kerala. Immigration, intermarriage and missionary activity/conversion — secured by the common interest in the spice trade — helped in this development. The Koyilandy Jumu'ah Mosque contains an Old Malayalam inscription written in a mixture of Vatteluttu and Grantha scripts which dates back to 10th century CE. It is a rare surviving document recording patronage by a Hindu king (Bhaskara Ravi) to the Muslims of Kerala. A 13th century granite inscription, written in a mixture of Old Malayalam and Arabic, at Muchundi Mosque in Kozhikode mentions a donation by the king to the mosque.

The Moroccan traveller Ibn Battutah (14th century) has recorded the considerably huge presence of Muslim merchants and settlements of sojourning traders in most of the ports of Kerala. By the early decades of the 14th century, travellers speak of Calicut (Kozhikode) as the major port city in Kerala. Some of the important administrative positions in the kingdom of Zamorin of Calicut, such as that of the port commissioner, were held by Muslims. The port commissioner, the Shah Bandar, represented commercial interests of the Muslim merchants. In his account, Ibn Battutah mentions Shah Bandars in Calicut as well as Quilon (Ibrahim Shah Bandar and Muhammed Shah Bandar). The Ali Rajas of Arakkal kingdom, based at Kannur, ruled the Lakshadweep Islands. Arabs had the monopoly of trade in Malabar Coast and Indian Ocean until the Portuguese Age of Discovery. The "nakhudas", merchant magnates owning ships, spread their shipping and trading business interests across the Indian Ocean.

The arrival of the Portuguese explorers in the late 15th century checked the then well-established and wealthy Muslim community's progress. Following the discovery of sea route from Europe to Kozhikode in 1498, the Portuguese began to expand their territories and ruled the seas between Ormus and the Malabar Coast and south to Ceylon. The Tuhfat Ul Mujahideen written by Zainuddin Makhdoom II (born around 1532) of Ponnani during 16th-century CE is the first-ever known book fully based on the history of Kerala, written by a Keralite. It is written in Arabic and contains pieces of information about the resistance put up by the navy of Kunjali Marakkar alongside the Zamorin of Calicut from 1498 to 1583 against Portuguese attempts to colonize Malabar coast. It was first printed and published in Lisbon. A copy of this edition has been preserved in the library of Al-Azhar University, Cairo. Tuhfatul Mujahideen also describes the history of Mappila Muslim community of Kerala as well as the general condition of Malabar Coast in the 16th century CE. With the end of Portuguese era, Arabs lost their monopoly of trade in Malabar Coast. As the Portuguese tried to establish monopoly in spice trade, bitter naval battles with the zamorin ruler of Calicut became a common sight. The Portuguese naval forces attacked and looted the Muslim dominated port towns in the Kerala. Ships containing trading goods were drowned, often along with the crew. This activities, in the long run, resulted in the Muslims losing control of the spice trade they had dominated for more than five hundred years. Historians note that in the post-Portuguese period, once-rich Muslim traders turned inland (southern interior Malabar) in search of alternative occupations to commerce.

By the mid-18th century the majority of the Muslims of Kerala were landless labourers, poor fishermen and petty traders, and the community was in "a psychological retreat". The community tried to reverse the trend during the Mysore invasion of Malabar District (late 18th century). The victory of the English East India Company and princely Hindu confederacy in 1792 over the Kingdom of Mysore placed the Muslims once again in economical and cultural subjection. The subsequent partisan rule of British authorities throughout the 19th and early 20th centuries brought the landless Muslim peasants of Malabar District into a condition of destitution, and this led to a series of uprisings (against the Hindu landlords and British administration). The series of violence eventually exploded as the Mappila Uprising (1921–22). The Muslim material strength - along with modern education, theological reform, and active participation in democratic process - recovered slowly after the 1921-22 Uprising. The Muslim numbers in state and central government posts remained staggeringly low. The Muslim literacy rate was only 5% in 1931.

A large number of Muslims of Kerala found extensive employment in the Persian Gulf countries in the following years (c. 1970s). This widespread participation in the "Gulf Rush" produced huge economic and social benefits for the community. A great influx of funds from the earnings of the employed followed. Issues such as widespread poverty, unemployment, and educational backwardness began to change. The Muslims in Kerala are now considered as section of Indian Muslims marked by recovery, change, and positive involvement in the modern world. Malayali Muslim women are now not reluctant to join professional vocations and assuming leadership roles. University of Calicut, with the former Malabar District being its major catchment area, was established in 1968. Calicut International Airport, currently the twelfth busiest airport in India, was inaugurated in 1988. An Indian Institute of Management (IIM) was established at Kozhikode in 1996.

== Demography ==
The last Indian Census was conducted in 2011. According to the 2011 Census of India, the district-wise distribution of the Muslim population is as shown below:

District wise map of Kerala	District	Total Pop	Muslims	% of Pop	% of Muslims
	Kerala	33,406,061	8,873,472	26.56%	100.0%
	Kasargod	1,307,375	486,913	37.24%	5.49%
	Kannur	2,523,003	742,483	29.43%	8.37%
	Wayanad	817,420	234,185	28.65%	2.64%
	Kozhikode	3,086,293	1,211,131	39.24%	13.65%
	Malappuram	4,112,920	2,888,849	70.24%	32.56%
	Palakkad	2,809,934	812,936	28.93%	9.16%
	Thrissur	3,121,200	532,839	17.07%	6.00%
	Ernakulam	3,282,388	514,397	15.67%	5.80%
	Idukki	1,108,974	82,206	7.41%	0.93%
	Kottayam	1,974,551	126,499	6.41%	1.43%
	Alappuzha	2,127,789	224,545	10.55%	2.53%
	Pathanamthitta	1,197,412	55,074	4.60%	0.62%
	Kollam	2,635,375	508,500	19.30%	5.73%
	Thiruvananthapuram	3,301,427	452,915	13.72%	5.10%

Distribution of Muslims in Kerala – District-wise.

== Theological orientations and denominations ==
Most of the Muslims of Kerala follow Sunni Islam of Shāfiʿī school of religious law (known in Kerala as the traditionalist 'Sunnis') while a large minority follow modern movements that developed within Sunni Islam. The latter section consists of majority Salafists (the Mujahids) and the minority Islamists. Both the traditional Sunnis and Mujahids again have been divided to sub-identities.

- Sunnī Islam
  - Shāfi'ī—mainly two groups (majority of traditional Sunnis in Kerala are Shafiʽis).
  - Ḥanafī
- Salafists (the Mujahids)—with different splinter factions (with varying degrees of puritanism). Kerala Nadvathul Mujahideen (K. N. M) is the largest Mujahid organisation in Kerala.
- Islamists (the Jama'at-i-Islami India)—representing political Islam in Kerala.
- Shīiah Islam
- Ahmadiyya Muslim Jama'at – Head Quarters of Ahmadiyya Muslim Community in Kerala is located at Baitul Quddoos, G.H Road Kozhikode (Calicut). Ahmadiyya Muslim Community.

== Communities ==
- Mappilas: The largest community among the Muslims of Kerala. As per some studies, the term "Mappila" denotes not a single community but a variety of Malayali Muslims from north Kerala (former Malabar District) of different ethnic origins. In south Kerala Malayali Muslims are not called Mappilas.

A Mappila is either,

1. A descendant of any native convert) to Islam (or)
2. A descendant of a marriage alliance between a Middle Eastern individual and a native low caste woman

The term Mappila is still in use in Malayalam to mean "bridegroom" or "son-in-law".

- Pusalans: Mostly converts from the Mukkuvan caste. Formerly a low status group among the Muslims of Kerala. The other Mappilas used call them "Kadappurattukar", while themselves were known as "Angadikkar". The Kadappurattukar were divided into two endogamous groups on the basis of their occupation, "Valakkar" and "Bepukar". The Bepukar were considered superior to Valakkar.

In addition to the two endogamous groups there were other service castes like "Kabaru Kilakkunnavar", "Alakkukar", and "Ossans" in Pusalan settlements. Ossan occupied the lowest position in the old hierarchy.

- Ossans: the Ossans were the traditional barbers among the Muslims of Kerala. Formed the lowest rank in the old hierarchy, and were an indispensable part of the village community of Muslims of Kerala.
- Thangals (the Sayyids): Claiming descent from the family of Muhammed. People who had migrated from Middle East. Elders of a number of widely respected Thangal families often served as the focal point of the Muslim community in old Malabar District.
- Rowthers: The Muslim community originated in Tamilakam. Mainly they settled in Trivandrum, Alapuzha, Kochi, kottayam, kollam, Idukki, Pathanamthitta, Pandalam, Palakkad regions in kerala. Rowther sect is a prominent and prosperous muslim community in Tamil Nadu and Kerala.
- Vattakkolis (the Bhatkalis) or Navayats: ancient community of Muslims, claiming Arab origin, originally settled at Bhatkal, Uttara Kannada. Speaks Navayati language. Once distributed in the towns of northern Kerala as a mercantile community. They are mainly distributed in the Northern parts of Malabar bordering Karnataka.
- Nahas: The origin of the name Naha is supposed to be a transformation of "nakhuda" which means captain of ship. Community concentrated mainly in Parappanangadi, south of Kozhikode who trace their origins to Persian ship owners.
- Marakkars: once multilingual maritime trading community settled in Kerala, Tamil Nadu, the Palk Strait and Sri Lanka. The most famous of the Marakkar were "Kunjali Marakkars", or the naval captains of the Zamorin of Calicut. The Muslims of pure Middle Eastern descent held themselves superior to Marakkars.
- Keyis: community of wealthy merchants, mainly settled in Kannur, Thalassery and Parappanangadi with Iranian origin.
- Koyas: Muslim community, in the city of Kozhikode forming a significant majority in Kozhikode and its adjoining areas. May be of Omani origin. It is said that the name is a corruption of “Khawaja”. Held administrative positions in the Kozhikode court of the zamorins.
- Kurikkals: a community of Muslims, claiming Arab origin, settled around Manjeri in Malappuram District.The family was first settled in Mavvancheri in North Malabar and moved to Manjeri in the beginning of the 16th century. Many of the members of the family served as instructor in the use of fire-arms in the employ of various chiefs of Malabar.
- Nainars: a community of Tamil origin. Settled only in Cochin, Mattanchery, Fort Kochi and Kodungallur. It is believed that the Nainars first settled in Kerala in the 15th century, entering into contract for certain works with the chiefs of Cochin.
- Dakhnis or Pathans: "Dakhni" speaking community. Migrated as cavalry men under various chiefs, especially in South Travancore. Some of them came South India along with the invasion of the Coromandel by the Khaljis. Many of the Dakhnis had also come as traders and businessmen.
- Kutchi Memons: They are a Kutchi speaking Gujarati ethnic group from the Kutch region. They are descended from the Lohana community among Gujarati Hindus.They were mainly traders who had migrated to Central Kerala with the other Gujarati traders.
- Beary/Byary: Muslims: community Stretching along the Tulunadu region. In Kerala they inhabits the coastal area of Kasargod district.They speak their own tongue which is called Beary language. They are originally mercantile community, hece the name 'beary', from the Sanskrit word 'Vyapari'(merchant).
- Bohras (Daudi Bohras): Western (Mustaalis) Ismaili Shiah community. Settled in a few major town in Kerala like Kozhikode, Kannur, Kochi and Alappuzha. Bohras migrated from Gujarat to Kerala. They form the major part of the Shia community in Kerala.

== Culture ==
=== Literature ===
Mappila Songs (or Mappila Poems) is a famous folklore tradition emerged in c. 16th century. The ballads are compiled in complex blend of Dravidian (Malayalam/Tamil) and Arabic, Persian/Urdu in a modified Arabic script. Mappila songs have a distinct cultural identity, as they sound a mix of the ethos and culture of Dravidian South India as well as West Asia. They deal with themes such as religion, satire, romance, heroism, and politics. Moyinkutty Vaidyar (1875–91) is generally considered as the poet laureate of Mappila Songs.

As the modern Malayali Muslim literature developed after the 1921–22 Uprising, religious publications dominated the field.

Vaikom Muhammad Basheer (1910–1994), followed by, U. A. Khader, K. T. Muhammed, N. P. Muhammed and Moidu Padiyath are leading Kerala Muslim authors of the modern age. Muslim periodical literature and newspaper dailies – all in Malayalam – are also extensive and critically read among the Muslims. The newspaper known as "Chandrika", founded in 1934, played as significant role in the development of the Muslim community.

=== Kerala Muslim folk arts ===
- Oppana was a popular form of social entertainment. It was generally performed by a group of women, as a part of wedding ceremonies a day before the wedding day. The bride, dressed in all finery, covered with gold ornaments, is the chief "spectator"; she sits on a pitham, around which the singing and dancing take place. While the women sing, they clap their hands rhythmically and move around the bride in steps.
- Kolkkali was a dance form popular among the Muslims. It was performed by a group of dozen young men with two sticks, similar to the Dandiya dance of Gujarat in Western India.
- Duff Muttu (also called Dubh Muttu) was an art form prevalent among Muslims, using the traditional duff, or daf, also called tappitta. Performers dance to the rhythm as they beat the duff.
- Arabana muttu was an art form named after the aravana, a hand-held, one-sided flat tambourine or drumlike musical instrument. It is made of wood and animal skin, similar to the duff but a little thinner and bigger.
- Muttum Viliyum was a traditional orchestral musical performance. It is basically the confluence of three musical instruments—kuzhal, chenda and cheriya chenda. Muttum Viliyum is also known by the name "Cheenimuttu".
- Vattappattu was an art form once performed in the Malabar region on the eve of the wedding. It was traditionally performed by a group of men from the groom’s side with the putiyappila (the groom) sitting in the middle.

=== Mappila cuisine ===
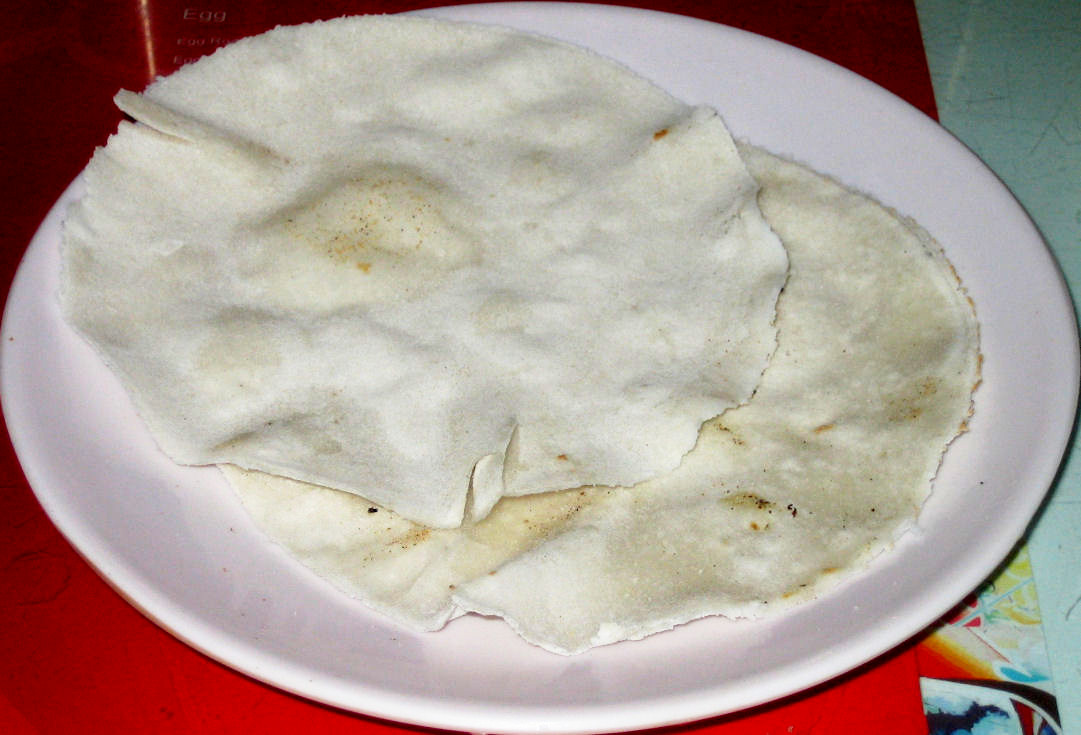
Pathiri, a pancake made of rice flour, is one of the common breakfast dishes in Malabar

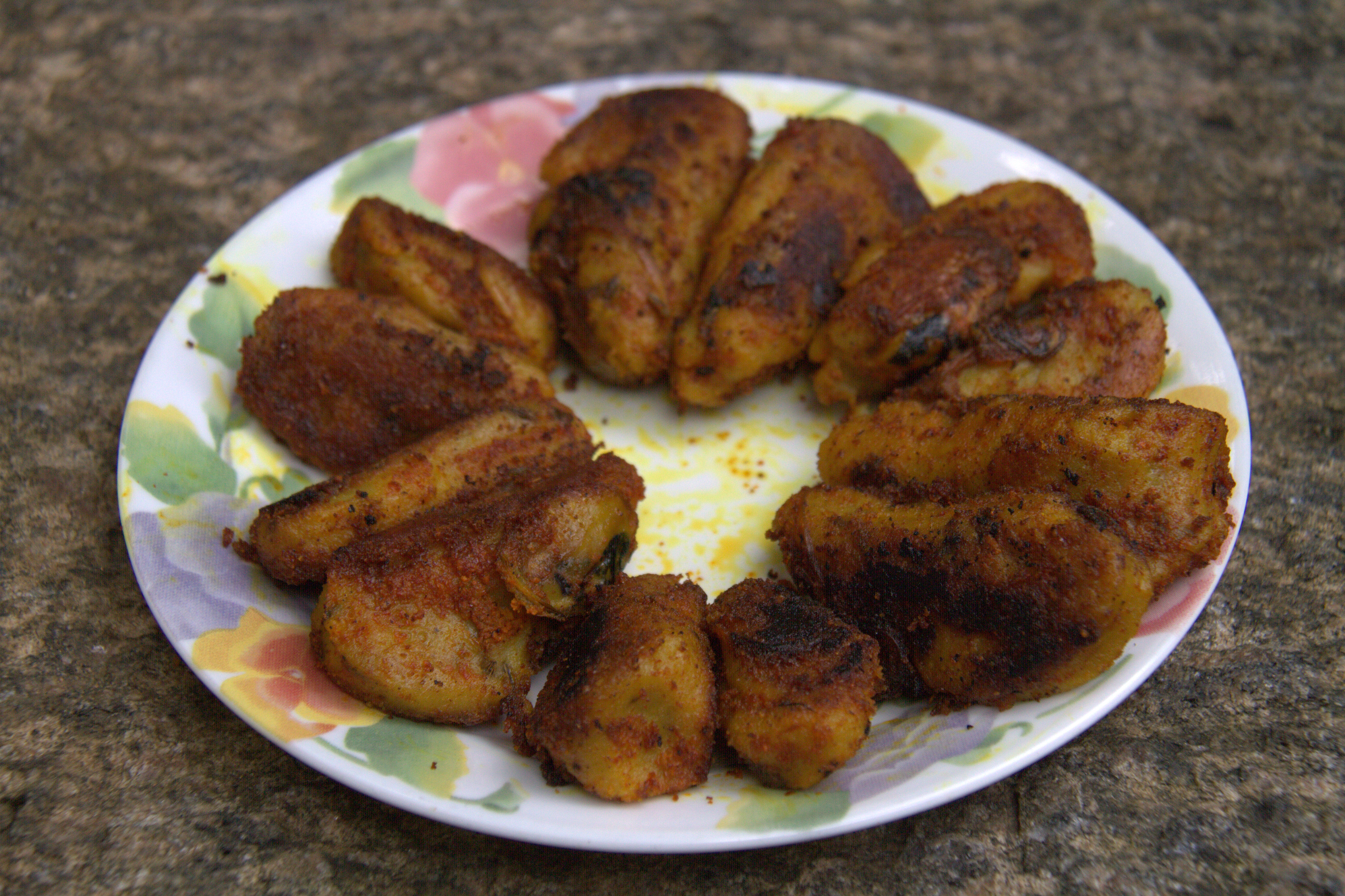
Kallummakkaya nirachathu or arikkadukka (mussels stuffed with rice)

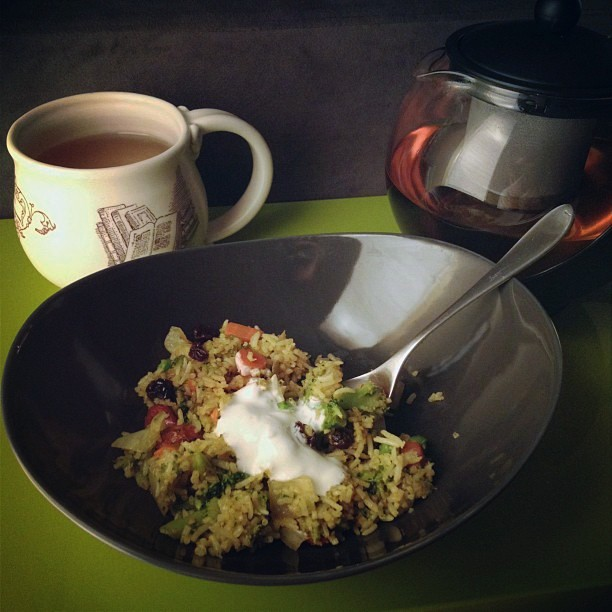
Thalassery biryani with raita

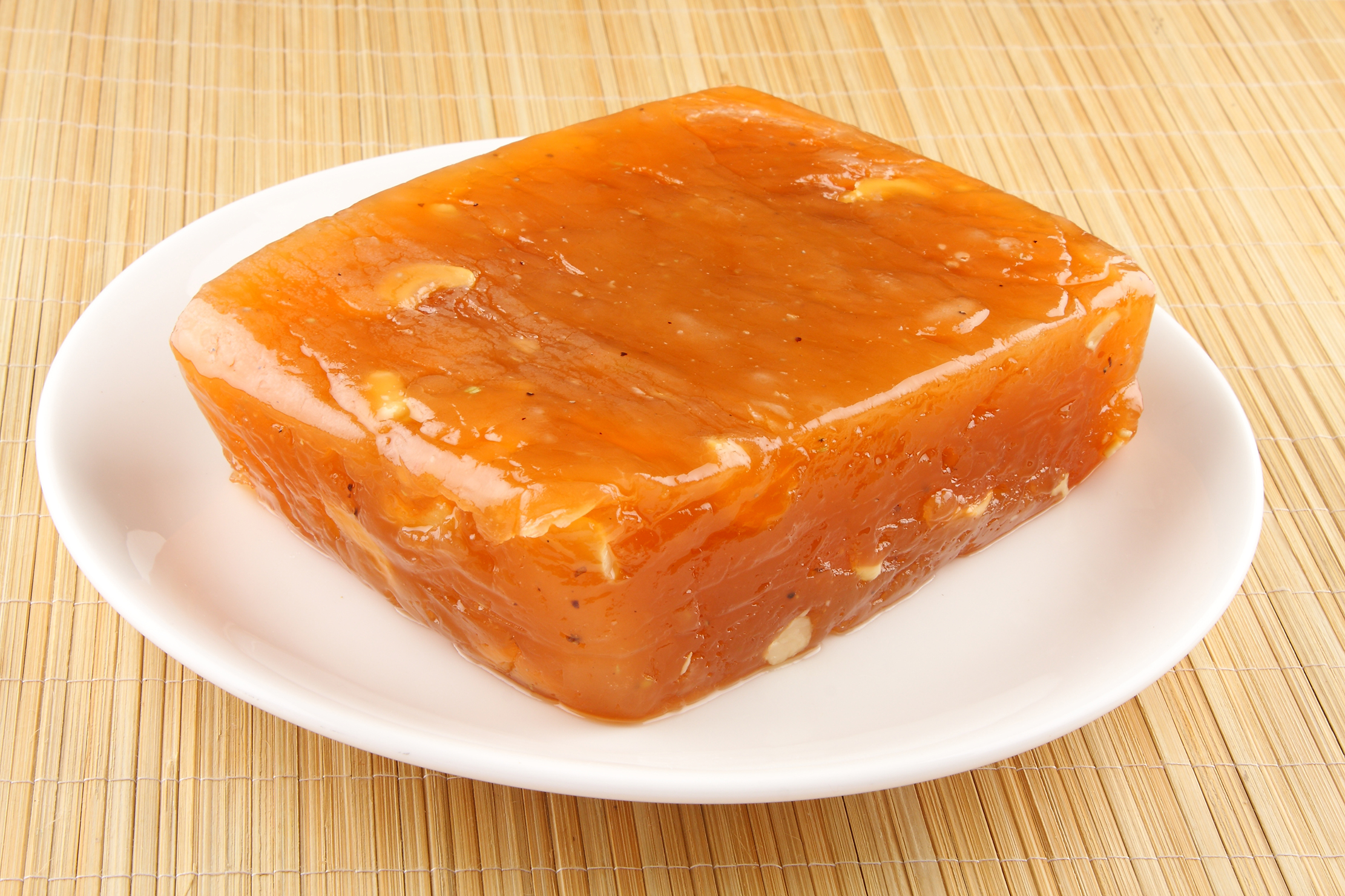
Halwas are popular in towns like Kannur, Thalassery, Kozhikode, and Ponnani

The Mappila cuisine is a blend of traditional Kerala, Persian, Yemenese and Arab food culture. This confluence of culinary cultures is best seen in the preparation of most dishes. Kallummakkaya (mussels) curry, irachi puttu (irachi meaning meat), parottas (soft flatbread), Pathiri (a type of rice pancake) and ghee rice are some of the other specialties. The characteristic use of spices is the hallmark of Mappila cuisine—black pepper, cardamom and clove are used profusely.

The Malabar version of biryani, popularly known as kuzhi mandi in Malayalam is another popular item, which has an influence from Yemen. Various varieties of biriyanis like Thalassery biriyani, Kannur biriyani, Kozhikode biriyani and Ponnani biriyani are prepared by the Mappila community.

The snacks include unnakkaya (deep-fried, boiled ripe banana paste covering a mixture of cashew, raisins and sugar), pazham nirachathu (ripe banana filled with coconut grating, molasses or sugar), muttamala made of eggs, chatti pathiri, a dessert made of flour, like a baked, layered chapati with rich filling, arikkadukka, and more.

== Religious education ==
According to K. Mohammed Basheer, Kerala has one of the oldest madrasa (Malayalam: othupalli / Palli Dar) education systems in India which has been reformed in modern times to include non-religious and religious subjects. Muslim communities, specifically Mappilas, form literate communities amongst Muslims in India. Historically, madrasas used to impart primary education about the mosque and the imams in it. Madrasas were non-residential, whilst residential facilities supported by mosques and the Muslim village community were called Palli Dar. During the British colonisation of India, madrasas were upgraded to centres of primary education. Post-independence, madrasas hold religious education classes before or after regular schools. The All Kerala Islamic Education Board were the first organization to conduct centralized examinations; subsequently, different schools of Islamic beliefs came forward to form their own Islamic education boards to train teachers and conduct centralized examinations: the Samastha Kerala Islam Matha Vidyabhyasa Board (SKIMVB), the Dakshiana Kerala Islam Matha Vidyabhyasa Board (DKIMVB), the Samastha Kerala Sunni Vidyabhyasa Board (SKSVB) and the Samastha Kerala Islamic Education Board (SKIEB). They are all grounded in Ahl as-Sunnah, whereas the Kerala Nadvathul Mujahideen Vidyabhyasa Board (KNM) and The Council for Islamic Education and Research (CIER) are rooted in Ahl-i Hadith. The Majlis al Ta'alim al Islami Kerala (Majlis) represent Jamaat-e-Islami.

Although the Kerala government does not have its own centralizing Madrasa board, Kerala madrasas affiliate themselves to various madrasa boards backed by various religious institutions, based on different ideologies. Among them, the Samastha Kerala Islam Matha Vidyabhyasa Board (SKIMVB) is the largest, with 80 percent of madrasa stating they are connected to Kerala.

Since the 20th century, Arabic language classes have been implemented in Kerala for advanced religious education.

Islamic universities operate in Kerala, including Markazu Saqafathi Sunniyya and Darul Huda Islamic University.

== See also ==
- Arabi Malayalam
- Arabi Malayalam script
- Onam and Islam
- Beary Muslims
- Beary language
- Tamil Muslim
- Sri Lankan Moors
- Nasrani Mappila

== Bibliography ==
- P. Shabna & K. Kalpana (2022) Re-making the self: Discourses of ideal Islamic womanhood in Kerala, Asian Journal of Women's Studies, 28:1, 24-43, doi:10.1080/12259276.2021.2010907
