= Demographics of Kozhikode district =

Kozhikode has been a multi-ethnic and multi-religious town since the early medieval period. The Hindus forms the largest religious group, followed by Muslims and Christians. Hindus form the majority at 57.7% with 315807 members of the total population. Muslims form 37.6% with 207298 members of the total population.

== Literacy ==
The corporation of Kozhikode has an average literacy rate of 96.8% (national average is 74.85%). Male literacy rate is 97.93% and female literacy rate is 95.78%. Malayalam is the most spoken language. English and Tamil are widely understood.

== Hindus ==
The Hindus engage in beliefs spanning all forms of theism Brahma, Vishnu, Shiva and other Gods and Goddesses of the Hindu pantheon are worshipped. Many places have temples with local deities, more often a Goddess (Devi). Festivities like Theyyam, Thira and art forms like Ottamthullal, Kathakali are performed in stages attested to temple estates. Many temples have associated oracles called Velichappad. Serpent and ancestral worship are also practised.

== Muslims ==
The Muslims of Kozhikode are known as Mappilas, and according to the official Kozhikode website "the great majority of them are Sunnis following the Shafi school of thought. There are also some smaller communities among the Muslims such as Dawoodi Bohras. Many of the Muslims living in the historic part of the city follow matriliny and are noted for their piety. Though Christianity is believed to have been introduced in Kerala in 52 CE, the size of the community in Malabar (northern Kerala) began to rise only after the arrival of the Portuguese towards the close of the 15th century. A few Christians of Thiruvitankoor and Kochi have lately migrated to the hilly regions of the district and are settled there.

== Professions ==
Pre-modern Kozhikode was already teeming with people of several communities and regional groups. Most of these communities continued to follow their traditional occupations and customs till the 20th century. These included Kosavan (potter), Vannan (washerman), Pulayan (agricultural worker), Chaliyan (weaver), Chetti (merchant), Thiyyar (physicians, militia and toddy tappers), Ganaka (astrologer), Vettuvan (salt-maker), Paanan (sorcerer), Eravallan (firewood and grass carrier), Kammalas, Parayan etc. A number of Brahmins too lived in the city mostly around the Hindu temples. Regional groups like the Tamil Brahmins, Gujaratis and Marwari Jains became part of the city at various periods and lived around their shrines.

== Nair Community ==
The Nairs formed the rulers, warriors and landed gentry of Kozhikode. The Samoothiri had a ten thousand strong Nair bodyguard called the Kozhikkottu pathinaayiram (The 10,000 of Kozhikode) who defended the capital and supported the administration within the city. He had a larger force of 30,000 Nairs in his capacity as the Prince of Eranadu, called the Kozhikkottu Muppatinaayiram (The 30,000 of Kozhikode). The Nairs also formed the members of the suicide squad (chaver). The aristocratic Nairs had their Taravad houses in and around the capital. Several Nairs in the city were traders too. The Nairs could not be imprisoned or fettered except for serious crimes like cow slaughter, criticising the King etc. The Mappila community of Kozhikode acted as an important support base for the city's military, economic and political affairs. They were settled primarily in Kuttichira and Idiyangara. Their aristocratic dwelling houses were similar to the tharavad houses of the Nairs and the Thiyyas. Two Ghazi's were recognised as their spiritual leaders. Travellers like Barbosa were intrigued by the extent to which the Mapillas blended into the local society, who spoke the same language and looked like any other Nair (except for the round caps and long beards).

== Thiyyar Community ==
The Thiyyar formed the vaidyars(Physicians), local militia and traders of Kozhikode. Several Thiyyar families such as 'Kallingal madom' were settled in and around the city.

== Tamil Brahmins ==
The Tamil Brahmins are primarily settled around the Tali Siva temple. They arrived in Kozhikode as dependants of chieftains, working as cooks, cloth merchants and moneylenders. They have retained their Tamil language and dialects as well as caste rituals. The Gujarati community is settled mostly around the Jain temple in and around the Valliyangadi. They owned a large number of establishments, especially textile and sweet meat shops. They must have arrived in Kozhikode at least from the beginning of the 14th century. They belong to either the Hindu or the Jain community. A few Marwari families are also found in Kozhikode who were basically moneylenders.
