= Chovvakkaran Moosa =

Indian pepper merchant

Chovvakkaran Moosa (Anglicized as 'Choacara Mousa') was a wealthy Indian pepper merchant ' of southern India, who died in Thalassery (formerly, 'Tellicherry') in 1807. He is also known, more parochially, as 'Moosakakka Keyi' (i.e. the honourable Moosa of the Keyi family).

== Early years ==
Moosa was born around 1745, probably in Chovva near Kannur. This was the home of his maternal uncle and benefactor, the rich spice merchant, Aluppi, who brought Moosa and his brother, Bappan, to Thalassery to exploit the emerging trade opportunities with the Europeans.

Very little is known about Moosa's origins, but he certainly benefitted from his uncle's patronage in his early years. Aluppi sponsored Moosa's first solo business enterprise in Thalassery, which proved to be a disaster. Undaunted, Moosa then sought the support of the Rajah of Travancore, who agreed to give him seed funding for his next venture and to provide a regular supply of teak.

== Dominating trade on the Malabar Coast ==
Once he had redeemed his financial position, Moosa returned to Thalassery (c. 1780) and eventually took over his uncle's business, supplying rice, pepper (known as 'Malabar gold') and other goods to the Europeans. Critical to their success, was the family's large mercantile fleet, which included European-built ocean-going vessels. He constructed the Moosakakka Canal to improve shipping. Moosa also fostered a strong network of suppliers throughout Kerala and deployed senior agents in the main commercial centres in India and even as far away as London, Paris and Amsterdam. At about this time, he also became a board member of the Bank of Madras. But the basis of Moosa's success as a businessman seems to have been his reliability in troubled times and the sustained good faith in which he acted with his Indian and British business partners.

The eighteenth-century mercantile profile of Moosa has generated considerable attention. Early economic historians argued that his comprador-like functions vis-à-vis the Tellicherry establishment (or the 'out-factory' of Tellicherry) as having more or less parasitical relations in the pre-colonial economy. Recently, there was an attempt to locate Moosa's contracting enterprise and its role in the broader context of early-modern capitalism. It is argued that Moosa, along with many of his contemporaries, had a role in economic dispossession.

== Contracts with the British East India Company ==
Moosa dominated trade in the north of Malabar from about 1783 until the first decade of the 1800s. After the Third Anglo-Mysore War in December 1793, he is listed as the first of five pepper merchants from the northern half of Malabar Province to sign a treaty with the British East India Company, guaranteeing the exclusive supply of all their pepper. By 1800, he dominated the whole of the Malabar coast and held monopoly contracts with the East India Company for most key goods.

Eventually, Moosa became so wealthy that he lent money to the East India Company, itself. He was also not afraid to use his connections to get an advantage. When his fleet was barred entry at Cochin in 1796 by the Rajah, he forced the issue, reminding the ruler of his exceptional influence with the British. The Rajah backed down. On other occasions, he threatened adversaries with the possibility that his interests might even be backed up with British military muscle.

== Relationship with Indian rulers ==
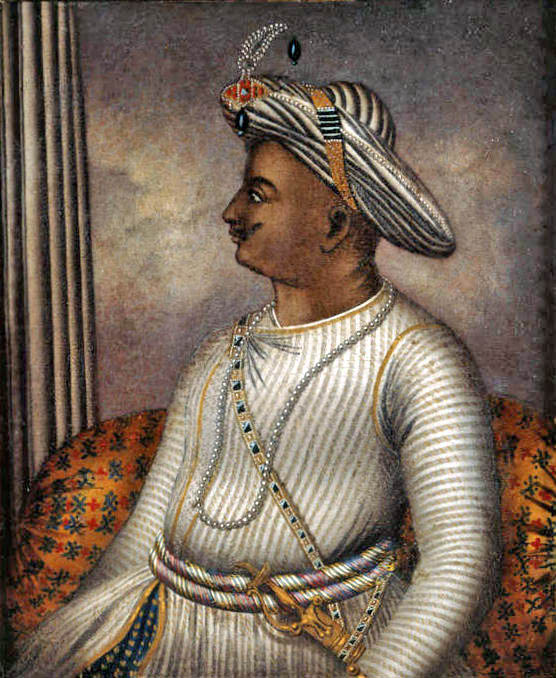
Tipu Sultan of the Mysore Kingdom

When Tipu Sultan seized Malabar in 1786, he coveted the valuable mercantile interests of Moosa and other merchants of the region, but he also realised that they were central to Malabar's ongoing prosperity. Moosa was warned by friends, who were close to Tipu Sultan, that his assets were in danger of being seized and that he should flee Thalassery. Nevertheless, Moosa and the other principal merchants remained, where they thought they were best able to protect their interests and, albeit to a diminished level, continue trading with the Europeans. They remained until the conclusion of the Third Anglo-Mysore War in 1792.

After the British were reestablished in the area, Moosa benefited from the declining fortunes of local aristocracies and the difficulties they faced in the changing landscape of British rule. For example, he was the mortgagee of valuable coir assets owned by Junumabe, the Bibi of Arakkal and her family on the Lakshadweep Islands.

== Relationship with the British ==
Although Moosa was considered by the East India Company to be one of its most important Indian allies, Moosa did have difficulty in his relationships with certain senior British figures. He came into conflict with British entrepreneur, Murdoch Brown. Moosa took Brown to court for debt and won, even being able to rely on the testimony of British officials in his defence. Nevertheless, in 1799, Brown was appointed the leading British official in Thalassery and Moosa had to be careful with his adversary in control.

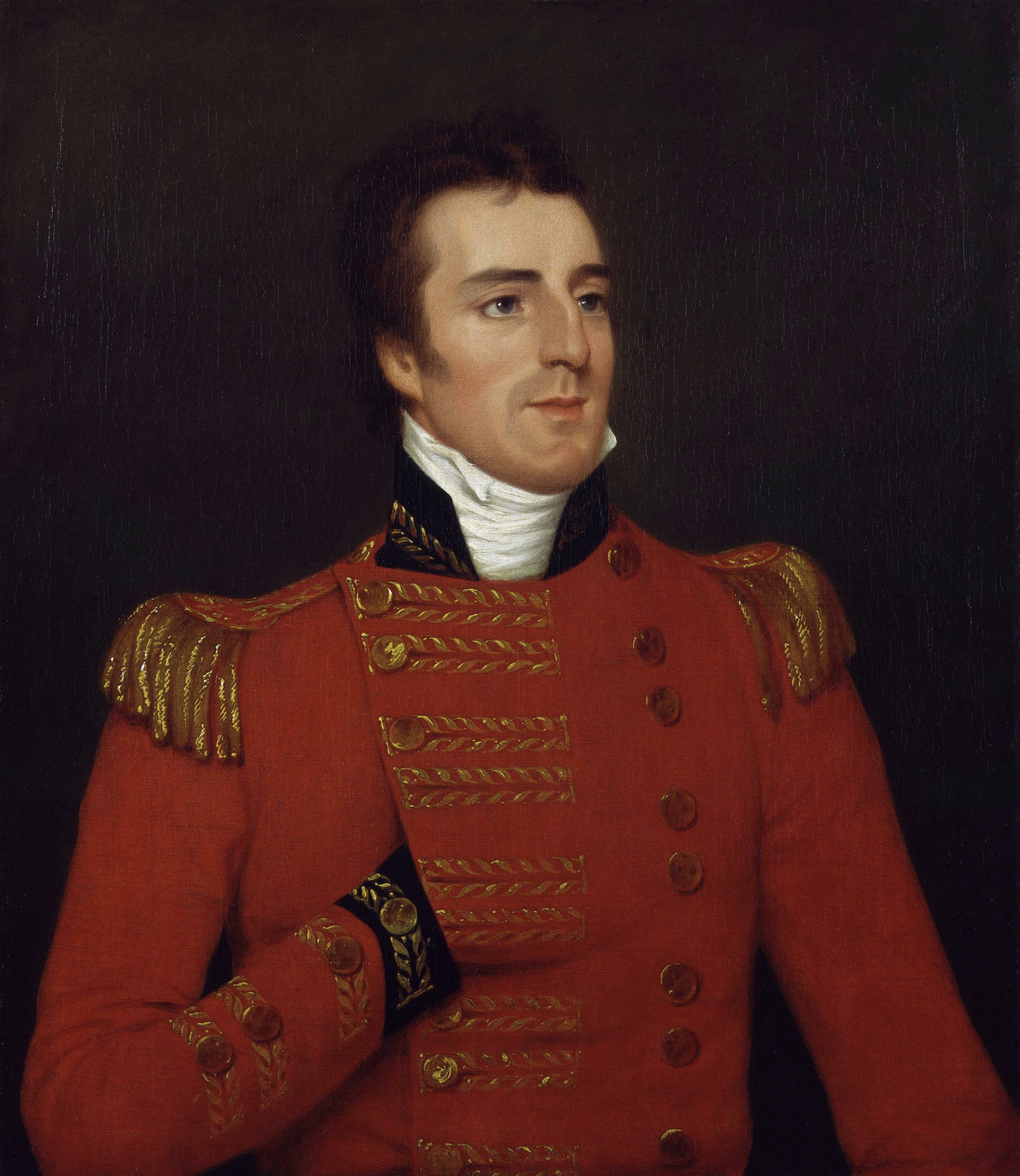
Major-General Arthur Wellesley in India, 1804. Later, the Duke of Wellington.

Moosa also had the distinction of having angered Arthur Wellesley, who became the Duke of Wellington, for his efforts to support his suppliers (many of them, rebels) whilst also juggling commitments to the British authorities. Wellington, whose elder brother Richard was Governor-General, wrote to Colonel Sartorius in 1800 suggesting that Moosa be executed for his dealings with the rebels.

There is a fellow, by the name of Mousa, at Tellicherry who supplies the Rajah with rice, to my certain knowledge. A hint might be given to him that I am in the habit of hanging those whom I find living under the protection of the Company and dealing treacherously towards their interests; that I spare neither rank nor riches; but that, on the contrary, I punish severely those who by their example create the evils for which the unfortunate people suffer.

Wellington seems to have had little grasp of Indian affairs and the complex considerations at play in servicing the lucrative pepper contracts. On the other hand, the Company officials would have understood that Moosa held a virtual monopoly of supply and, therefore, was obliged to negotiate with the rebels, who held much of the pepper territory. Moreover, there were hostile foreign traders poised to take advantage. Wellington's advice was ignored.

== Final Years ==
In the early 1800s, Moosa's fortune, fleet and mercantile interests continued to grow. He died in 1807, one of Malabar's most wealthy and influential figures. He is interred in a mausoleum in the Odathil Palli mosque, which he built sometime before 1806.

The Keyi family continued to enjoy its good fortune. In 1813, Moosa's son and main heir was described as 'the richest man on the Malabar Coast'. The Moosa family, which is still prominent in Thalassery, runs a nineteenth-century guest house, which, it is claimed, once belonged to their ancestor's bitter rival, Murdoch Brown.
