= Keyi family =

Indian family

Keyi (Malayalam: കേയി, pronounced [keːyee], (Keyi Mappila) are one of the oldest families among the Muslims of Malabar, India. The Keyis are known for their immense wealth and land properties acquired through trade with the English East India Company. The Keyi family has its roots in Thalassery, Kannur district of Kerala.

== History ==
Although Aluppy Keyi laid the foundation of Keyi family, it was his nephew Moosa, who was responsible for strengthening the family's position to the extent that it came to dominate the Malabar economy. He was also known as Chaua Moosa.

When the Mysorian interlude began Moosa proved to be a friend of British and came to the rescue of the Rajas. Chirakkal Raja and family, who took refuge in Thalassery's Sri Ramaswamy temple, were taken along with all their wealth in pathemars and small ships to Travancore. The Travancore Maharaja gave them asylum (The Travancore Dynasty was the mother family (or lineage) of the Kolathiri (Chirakkal) Royal Family who ruled over the Kannur-Wayanad-Kasaragod regions which included Thalassery)

During the Mysorean raids in the late 1700s, trade decreased and the business which Moosakakka started with the help of his uncle, struggled greatly. He left Thalassery to Venad to seek the help of the Maharaja of Travancore. The king gave him financial help to start a new business. His business flourished and he returned with gifts and asked the Maharaja to take back the money he had given him. The king declined and gave him all facilities to trade in his kingdom. He guaranteed a supply of teakwood, which he used for the construction of a mosque in Thalassery and other projects.

Finally Kerala came under the suzerainty of the British. The Keyi dominance in trade increased considerably. With British help, Moosa established trade relations with the British East India Company and deployed a network of family agents throughout India and in Europe, specifically, in London, Paris and Amsterdam. He was also a contractor to the company for supplying essential commodities.

Musa became a mediator in between British and the Arakkal family, the only Muslim ruling dynasty in Kerala. The Sultan accepted the rule of British and the Company asked the sultan to pay 1,000,000 rupees as war indemnity. The Raja failed to pay the money and Moosakakka paid the money for the Raja and later recovered from the revenues which were hypothecated to him. In appreciation the Sultan gave consent for marriage of a beevi (lady) of his family with Hussen, a nephew of Moosa.

== See also ==
- Arakkal Raja
- Odathil Mosque
- East India Company
- Mappila
- Thalassery
