= Mishkal =

Mishkal may refer to:

- Mishkal Mosque, a Šāfiʿī mosque located in Calicut on Malabar Coast, in the state of Kerala, India
- Mishkal Ramsaroop, a South African first-class cricketer
- In Hebrew language morphology: word derivation pattern, especially for nouns; see Semitic root
