= Muchundi Mosque =

Mosque in Kozhikode, India

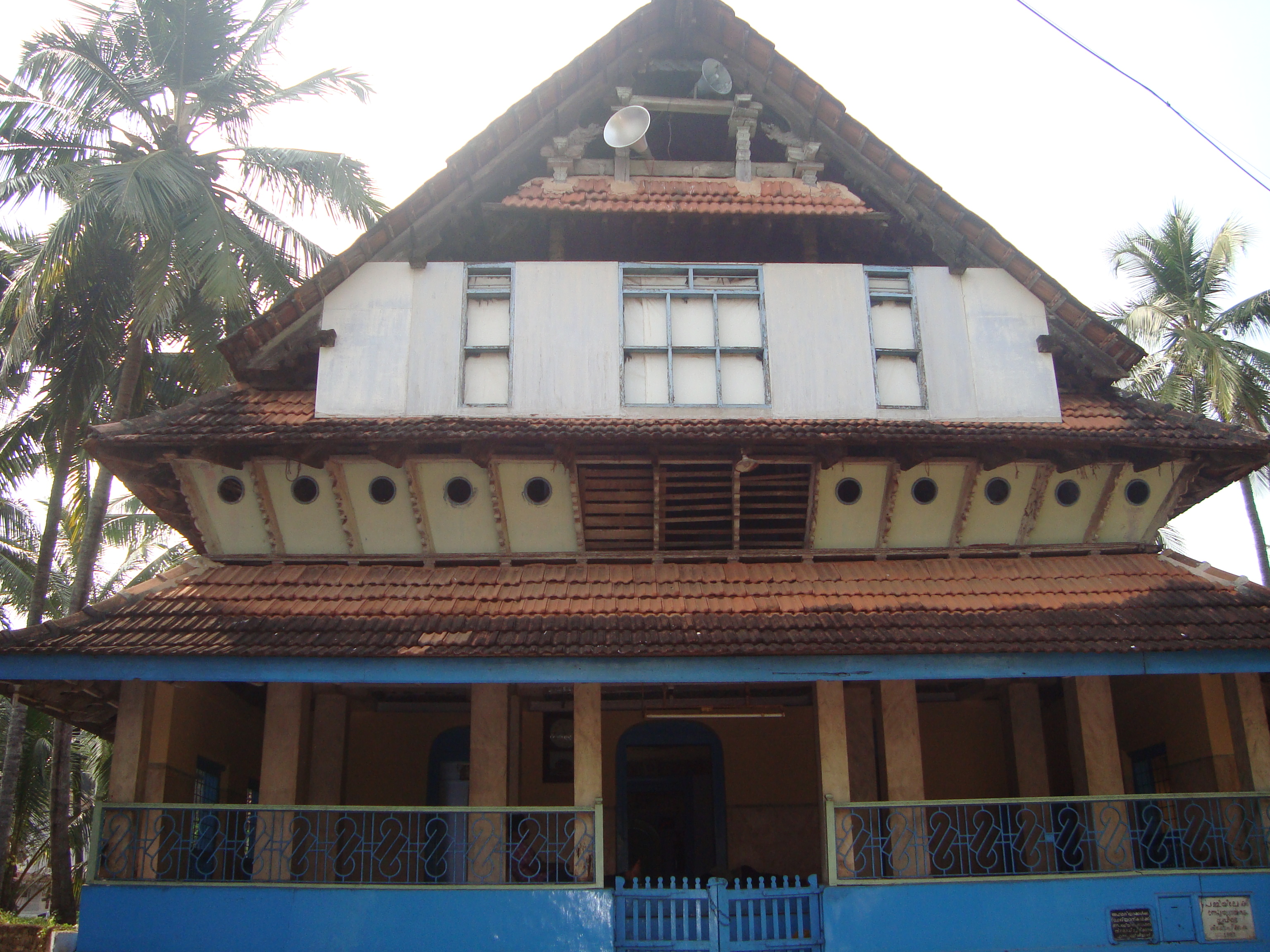
- The mosque in 2010

- Location of the mosque in Kerala

Religion
- Affiliation: Sunni Islam
- Rite: Šāfiʿī
- Ecclesiastical or organizational status: Mosque
- Status: Active

Location
- Location: Kuttichira, Kozhikode district, Kerala
- Country: India
- Interactive map of Muchundi Mosque
- Coordinates: 11°14′31″N 75°46′36″E

Architecture
- Type: Mosque architecture
- Style: Kerala-Islamic
- Completed: 13th century
- Inscriptions: Two

The Muchundi Mosque (Malayalam: മുച്ചുന്തിപ്പള്ളി), also known as the Muccunti Palli, and formerly known as the Muchiyan/Machinde/Muchandi Palli, is a Šāfiʿī mosque, located at Kuttichira, in the Kozhikode district in the state of Kerala, India. Kuttichira is the medieval Muslim quarter in the city of Calicut. The mosque is situated south of Mishkal Mosque, Kuttichira Tank, and the Kuttichira Jum'ah Masjid. The mosque does not conduct the jum'ah prayers – the special noon service on Friday that all adult, male, free Muslims are obliged to attend.

== Overview ==
Built in the Kerala-Islamic style, the mosque does not have minarets, domes, or arches. The ceiling of the mosque contains elaborate calligraphy of the Qur'anic verses, decorated with carved flowers on the side. It is reasonable to assume that the foundations have supported one of the oldest mosques in Kozhikode.

The Muchundi Mosque has a granite inscription that dates from the 13th century CE. The inscription is the only surviving document recording endowment by a Hindu king (the Zamorin of Calicut) to the Muslims of Kerala. The inscription states that the mosque was established by Shahab al-din Raihan. Historians tentatively assume that "Muchiyan" might be the old Malayalam name given to Raihan by the people of Kozhikode. Raihan must have been a wealthy Arab merchant who settled at Kozhikode. A medieval Muslim aristocratic house called "Muchintakam" is situated close to the mosque. A traditional jaram – a mausoleum/tomb – called "Muchiyante Jaram" is also located near the mosque. The Zamorins of Calicut remained the protectors of the mosque throughout the medieval times. The salary of the qadi of the mosque was paid by from Kozhikode.

The mosque is sometimes associated with Shaikh Zain-ud-Din Makhdum II, the 16th century polymath, and the famous author of Tuhafat al-Mujahidin.

=== Inscription ===
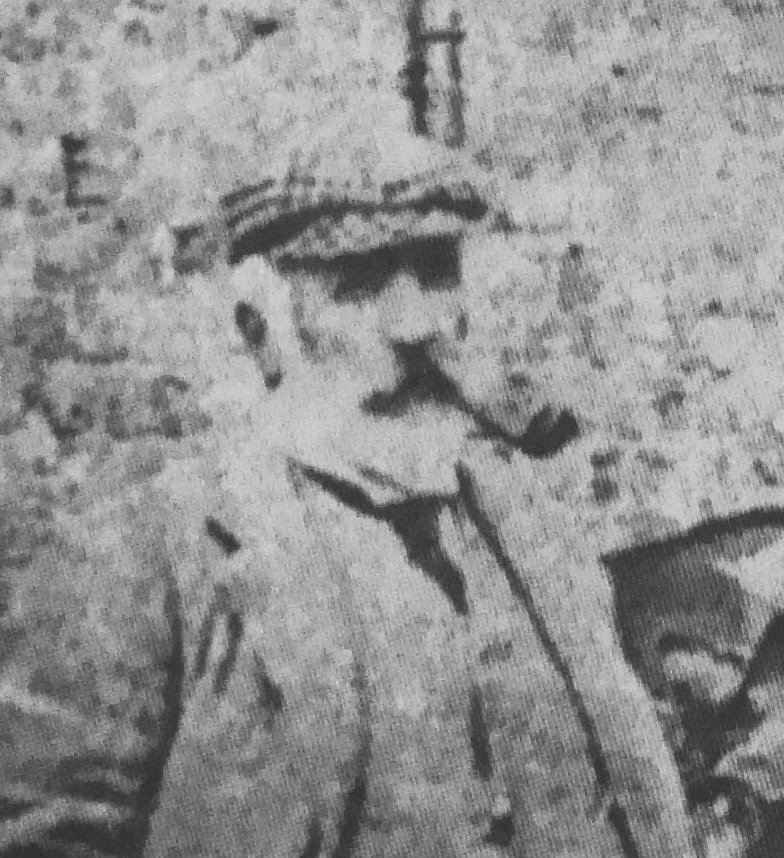
William Logan was the first person to understand the significance of the Muchundi Mosque kinscription

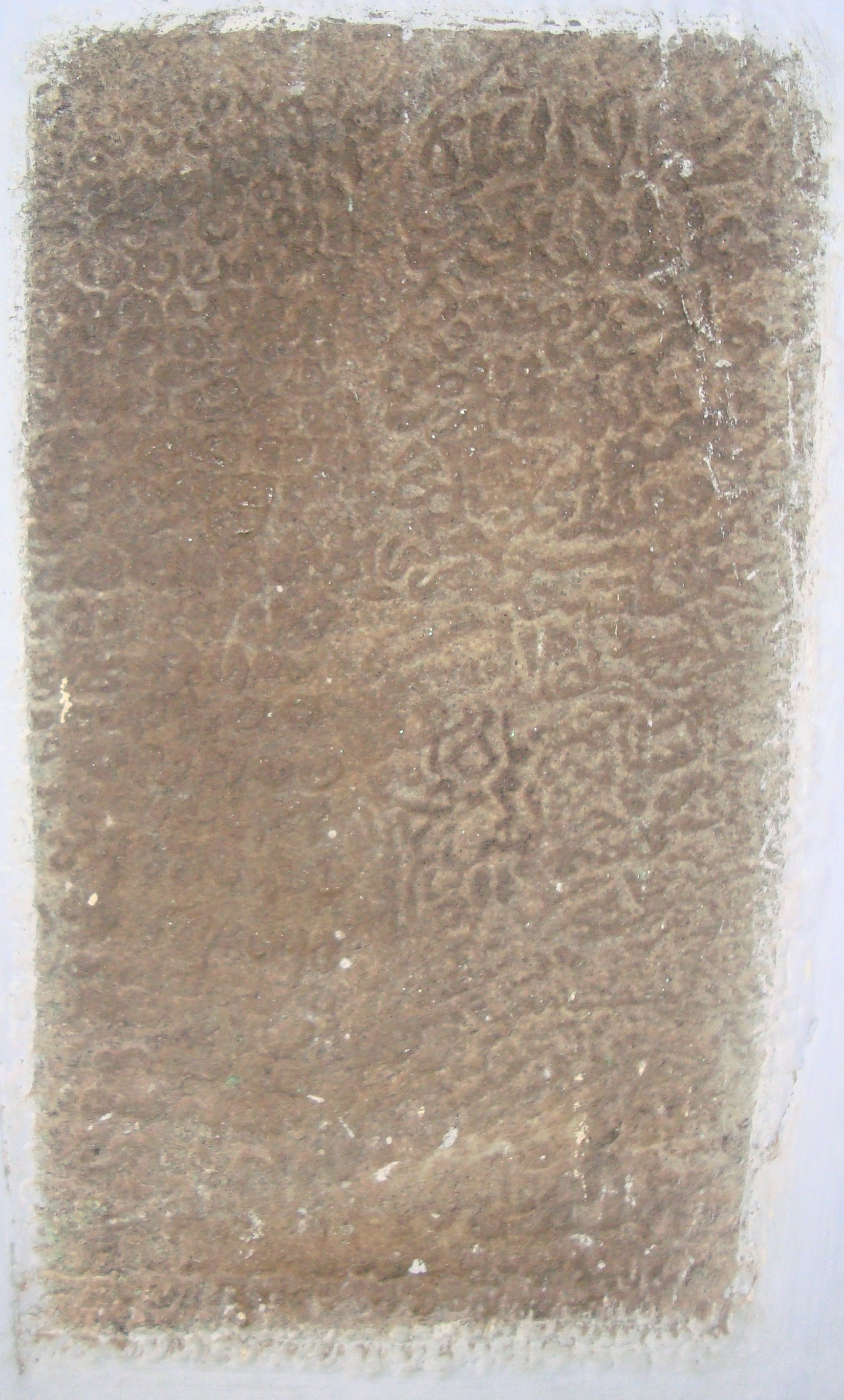
Muchundi inscription. The left portion contains Vattezhuthu characters (Old Malayalam) and the right portion contains Arabic characters

William Logan, former Collector and Magistrate of Malabar District, made a reference to the Muchundi inscription in his manual Malabar (1887). Logan called the mosque "Machchinde Mosque". The inscription was eventually deciphered by historians M. G. S. Narayanan, M. R. Raghava Warrier and Kunhu Muhammed.

The highly damaged, worn and fragmentary donative inscription is engraved on a granite stone slab. (Note: The slab is seen as fixed on the wall at Mosque Muchundi.) The inscription is undated, but can be positioned on paleographic grounds to c. 13th century CE. The content is divided on functional grounds between Old Malayalam and Arabic languages. The concluding portion is in Arabic, while the functional portion recording the specific details of the endowment is in Old Malayalam. The script of the Old Malayalam portion is Vattezhuthu, a type of medieval script closely related to modern Malayalam and Tamil. The letters are not carved into the stone surface – like the usual Kodungallur Chera style – but are raised on the stone in imitation of the standard practice in Islamic inscriptions.

=== Text ===
The text is divided into two distinct halves. First half has 32 very short Vattezhuthu lines in Old Malayalam. It describes the assignment of revenues accruing from certain lands for the expenditure of Muchundi Mosque. The inscription mentions two local place names, "Kunnamangalam" and "Pulikkizhu".

According to M. G. S. Narayanan, the old Malayalam (Vatteluttu) portion is translated in English as:

"This is an order of Punturakkon, this is to...by the Officer - in - Attendance (Kettu Viliyan). He ordered that daily expenses of one nazhi [of rice should be] granted to the Muchiyan's Mosque...He ordered that from Kunnamangalam...Pulikkizhu...to the Mosque...future also...Twelve para..."

The Arabic portion, the second half, starts with the opening prayer from Qur'an. It reads that certain Shahab al-din Raihan purchased the piece of land and constructed thereon the mosque, and made provision for its imam and mua'dhdhin. Z. A. Desai translated the Arabic portion into English as:

"Shahab al-din Raihan was a freed slave (atiq) of the late Mas'ud, purchased ...(?)... out of his own money, land from its owner and constructed thereon this mosque and well and made [provision] for its imam and mua'dhdhin by constructing a big edifice"

Ibn Batutah, a 14th-century traveller, indicated that Shihab-ud-Din Khasaruni was a Shah Bandar of the Samoothir of Kozhikode.

== See also ==
- Islam in India
- List of mosques in India
- List of mosques in Kerala
