= Koya (Malabar) =

Social group in southern India

Koya is a Muslim community, predominantly found in the city of Calicut in southern India. The powerful Koyas held the headmen position among the Mappila community in medieval Calicut.

The Koyas are mostly concentrated in and around the Kuttichira region in Calicut. The Koya family was invited by Raja Keshavadas to Alleppey from Malabar during its formation. They were given permission to construct houses and conduct trade to various parts of Travancore Kingdom. The Koya family in Alleppey still have their Major undivided property and Tharavads like Pyngamadom, Puthen nalakam, Pulikkalakath, Puthenveedu, Vyranveedu. These Tharavads stand as historic monuments near Stone Bridge Alleppey. Koyas are also found on the Laccadive Islands as well as in other parts of the former South Malabar Taluk.

The Koyas followed maternal kinship system ("marumakathayam").
