= Vattappattu =

Traditional male folk song and dance form from Malabar, Kerala

- Native name: വട്ടപ്പാട്ട്
- Genre: Muslim folk song and performance
- Origin: Kerala, India

Vattappattu (Malayalam: വട്ടപ്പാട്ട്) is a traditional male folk song and performance art form from the Malabar region of Kerala, India. It is often described as the male counterpart to the female-dominated *Oppana* and is traditionally performed during wedding-related celebrations and Kerala school youth festivals.

== History and context ==
Vattappattu is customarily performed by men from the groom’s side during traditional Muslim wedding ceremonies. It combines song, rhythmic clapping, and light movement, and the lyrics often reflect Islamic traditions, local stories, and celebratory themes. In recent years, Vattappattu has transitioned from weddings to becoming a competitive cultural item at Kerala School Kalolsavams and youth festivals such as the State School Youth Festival.

== Performance ==
The performance typically features a lead singer and a chorus of male performers dressed in white mundu, kurta, and headgear. They engage in rhythmic clapping and occasionally incorporate humor and choreography. Unlike Oppana (female version), Vattappattu emphasizes camaraderie and communal celebration.

== Cultural significance ==
Vattappattu helps preserve Malabar’s Muslim cultural heritage and fosters community bonding. It is especially popular in schools and colleges during cultural festivals, maintaining its relevance among younger audiences.

== See also ==
- Oppana
- Mappila songs
- Kerala School Kalolsavam
- Nayadikali
- Vadakkan Pattukal
