= Ali Raja =

Indian Muslim royal title

The Sultan Ali Raja or Ali Raja or Adi Raja was the title of the Muslim king of Arakkal kingdom from the sixteenth to early nineteenth century.

== Arakkal dynasty ==
=== Reigning rajas and beevis ===
- Ali Raja Ali I (1545–1591)
- Ali Raja Abubakar I (1591–1607)
- Ali Raja Abubakar II (1607–1610)
- Ali Raja Muhammad Ali I (1610–1647)
- Ali Raja Muhammad Ali II (1647–1655)
- Ali Raja Qamal (1655–1656)
- Ali Raja Muhammad Ali III (1656–1691)
- Ali Raja Ali II (1691–1704)
- Ali Raja Hamza I (1704–1720)
- Ali Raja Muhammad Ali IV (1720–1728)
- Ali Raja Beevi Harra Sultana (1728–1732)
- Ali Raja Beevi Junuma Sultana I (1732–1745)
- Ali Raja Kunhi Hamza II (1745–1777)
- Ali Raja Beevi Junuma Sultana II (1777–1819)

=== Heads of the Arakkal dynasty since 1819 ===
- Arakkal Beevi Mariam Sultana (1819–1838)
- Arakkal Beevi Hayasha Sultana (1838–1852)
- Sultan Abdul Rahman I Ali Raja (1852–1870)
- Sultan Musa Ali Raja (1870–1899)
- Sultan Muhammad Ali Raja V (1899–1907)
- Arakkal Beevi Imbichi Sultana(1907–1911)
- Sultan Ahmad Ali Raja (1911–1921)
- Arakkal Beevi Ayesha Sultana I (1921–1931)
- Sultan Abdul Rahman Ali Raja (1931–1946)
- Arakkal Beevi Mariam Sultana (1946–1947)
- Sultan Hamza Ali Raja (1981–1998)
- Arakkal Beevi Habiba Sultana (1998–2006)
- Arakkal Beevi Zainaba Ayesha Sultana II (2006–2018)
- Arakkal Beevi Habiba Sultana II (2018-2019)
- Arakkal Beevi Mariam Sultana II (2019-2021)
- Arakkal Sultan Hameed Hussain Ali Raja (2021-present).

== See also ==
- Arakkal Museum
- Keyi family
- Kannur Fort - (St. Angelo Fort)
- List of Sunni Muslim dynasties
- Mysore invasion of Kerala
