= Nainars =

Muslim community of Kerala

Nainars are a vegetarian Hindu community first settled in central Kerala (around 15-16th century AD). The Nainar community had certain rights and privileges during the procession (ezhunnallathu) ceremony of the king of the Cochin.

== History ==
The community first arrived in Kerala from southern Tamil Nadu by entering into contract for certain works with the Hindu kings of Cochin. It seems that the community also faced some persecution in the Pandya (southern) Tamil country.
