= Nayadikali =

Indian folk dance

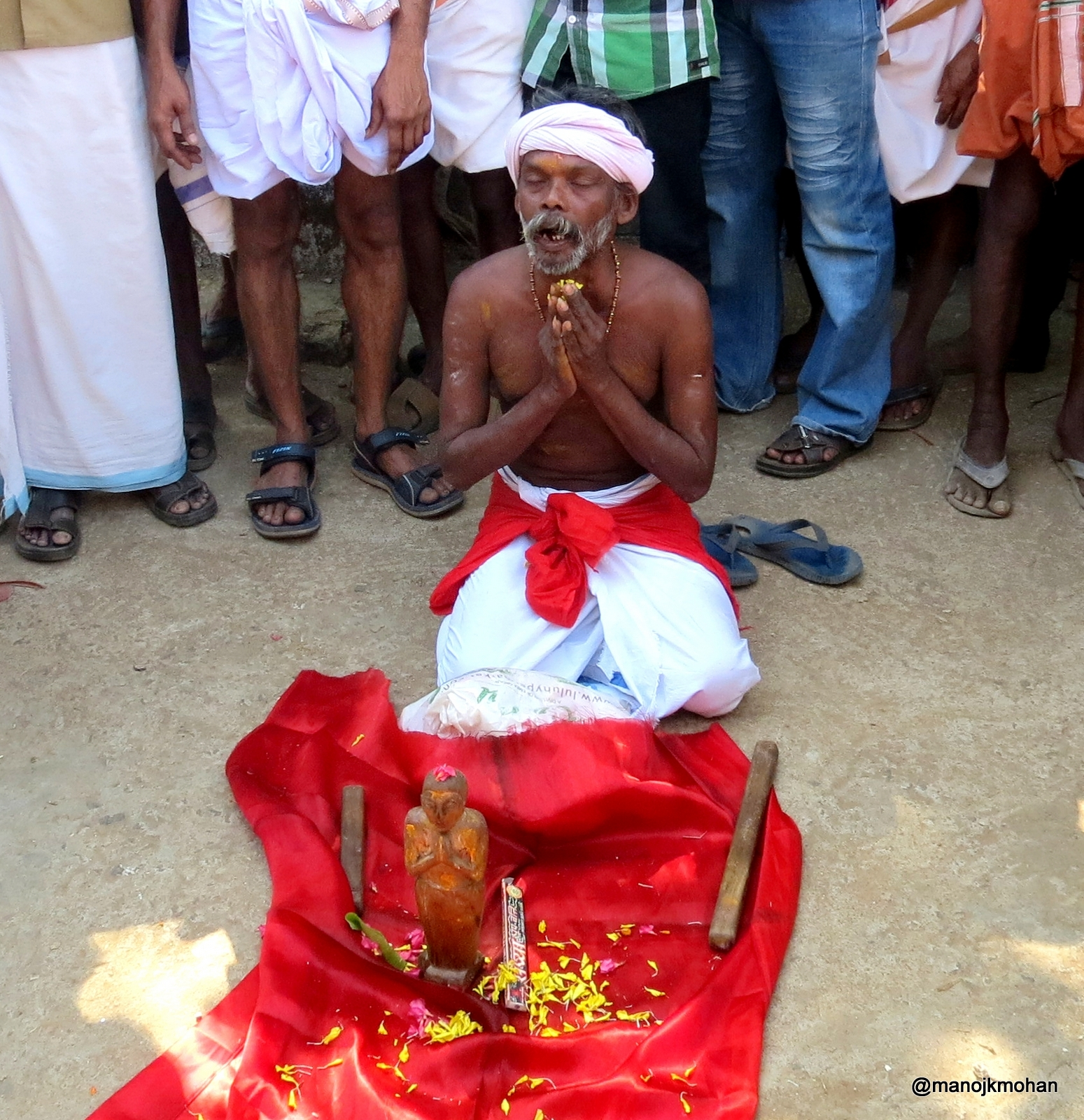
- Nayadikali at Uthralikkavu temple, Palakkad
- Native name: നായാടിക്കളി (Malayalam)
- Genre: Indian folk dance
- Instrument(s): Bamboo sticks
- Origin: Kerala, India

Nayadikali (literally means hunting dance) is a traditional folk art form that exists among the Panan community of the Valluvanad region (present-day Palakkad, Thrissur districts) in Kerala, India. It is usually performed ahead of the Pooram festival at the Devi temples in the region, for the good and prosperity of the people and region.

== Performance ==
Nayadikali is a folk art form propagated since ancient times for the good and prosperity of the region. Ahead of the Pooram festival at the Devi temples, Nayadikali groups roam around homes in the region. Dressed up as people who go hunting in the forest, the Panan community goes from house to house and sings and plays. There are usually one to five people in a group. Their musical instruments used are two bamboo sticks, one will be long and the other will be short. The folk song is sung by holding the long stick in the left armpit and tapping it with a short stick.

They come wearing unique clothes on top of the mundus wrapped around their waists, with another mundu tied on their heads and painted different colors on their bodies. There will also be a cloth bag on the shoulder. They also carry a small wooden statue in their hand, called Ittingalikutty. This statue is placed in the courtyard and danced around it by beating the stick to and fro. They usually sing hunting related songs along with it. There is also a habit of making up own songs and singing them on the spot.

After the Nayadikali, rice, paddy and money will be given to the performers from the homes. On the day of Pooram, all groups reach the temple and play the finale performance. They also perform a kind of puppet show with the wooden puppet in their hand.
