= Muhyadheen mala =

Arabic-Malayalam literary work

Muhyidheen Mala is an ode of praise for the Muhyadheen Abdul Khadir Al Gilani composed by the poet Khazi Muhammad of Kozhikode in the 17th century. Kerala Muslims celebrated its fourth century completion under cultural department last year.

Al-Gilani succeeded the spiritual chain of Junayd Baghdadi. His contribution to thought in the Muslim world earned him the title Muhiyuddin (lit. "The reviver of the faith"), as he along with his students and associates laid the groundwork for the society which later produced stalwarts like Nur ad-Din and Saladin. His Sufi order named after him is generally thought to be one of the most popular Sufi orders of the Islamic world.[4]

== Popularity of Muhyadheen Mãla ==
Sufi Muslims have traditionally venerated the verses. The poem is memorized and recited in congregations. Some Muslims believe that, if recited with love and devotion, the Mãla can cure diseases and purify hearts.

== Find the Mãla online ==
The sole credit of " Muhyadheen Mala" goes to Qadi Muhammed of Kozhikode, a place situated in the southernmost part of India. Qadi Muhammed himself admits that he had relied upon the Book "Bahja" (Bahjathul Asrar va Maadinul Anwar)written by Sheik Abul Hasan Ash shettanaufi (d.713 AH).We could not get a clear account about author of Muhyadheen mala.

english translation of mala the American researcher keeli suton translated muhyudheen mala totally in verse form into en English. she is currently a research fellow of Texas university trying to translate more arabi-malayalam texts to english. one of the finest interpretations of this texts is given by Dr. Yasser Arafath, a Delhi University historian. His work has been published in Jamal Ahmad (ed.), 'Proceedings of Muslim Heritage Conference', Islamic Publishing House, Calicut, 2015. Title of the work is ‘Muhiyudheen Maala Enna Prathirodha Sahityam’ (Muhiyudheen Maala: As a Resistance Text].http://muslimheritage.in/innermore.php?arid=143. An earlier version of this work, titled 'Muhiyudheen Maala: History, Politics, and Resistance’ was published in Bodhanam Quarterly Journal, Vol, 15 (13), Calicut, India.

== See also ==
- Qaṣīdah al-Burda
