= Kuttichira Beach =

Kuttichira
- Location in Kerala, India
- Coordinates: 11.242894°N 75.779271°E
- Country: India
- State: Kerala
- District: Kozhikode

Languages
  - Official: Malayalam, English
- Time zone: UTC+5:30 (IST)
- Vehicle registration: KL-11

Kuttichira or Thekkepuram is a quarter located inside the city of Kozhikode in the Indian state of Kerala. Its approximate boundaries are the Arabian Sea on the west, the Kallai river on the south, Vellayil village on the north, and Kozhikode town on the east.

== Notable locations ==
- Mishkal Mosque:

One of the oldest mosques in Kerala built in the Temple style of architecture. The office of Kozhikode Chief Qazi is situated here.

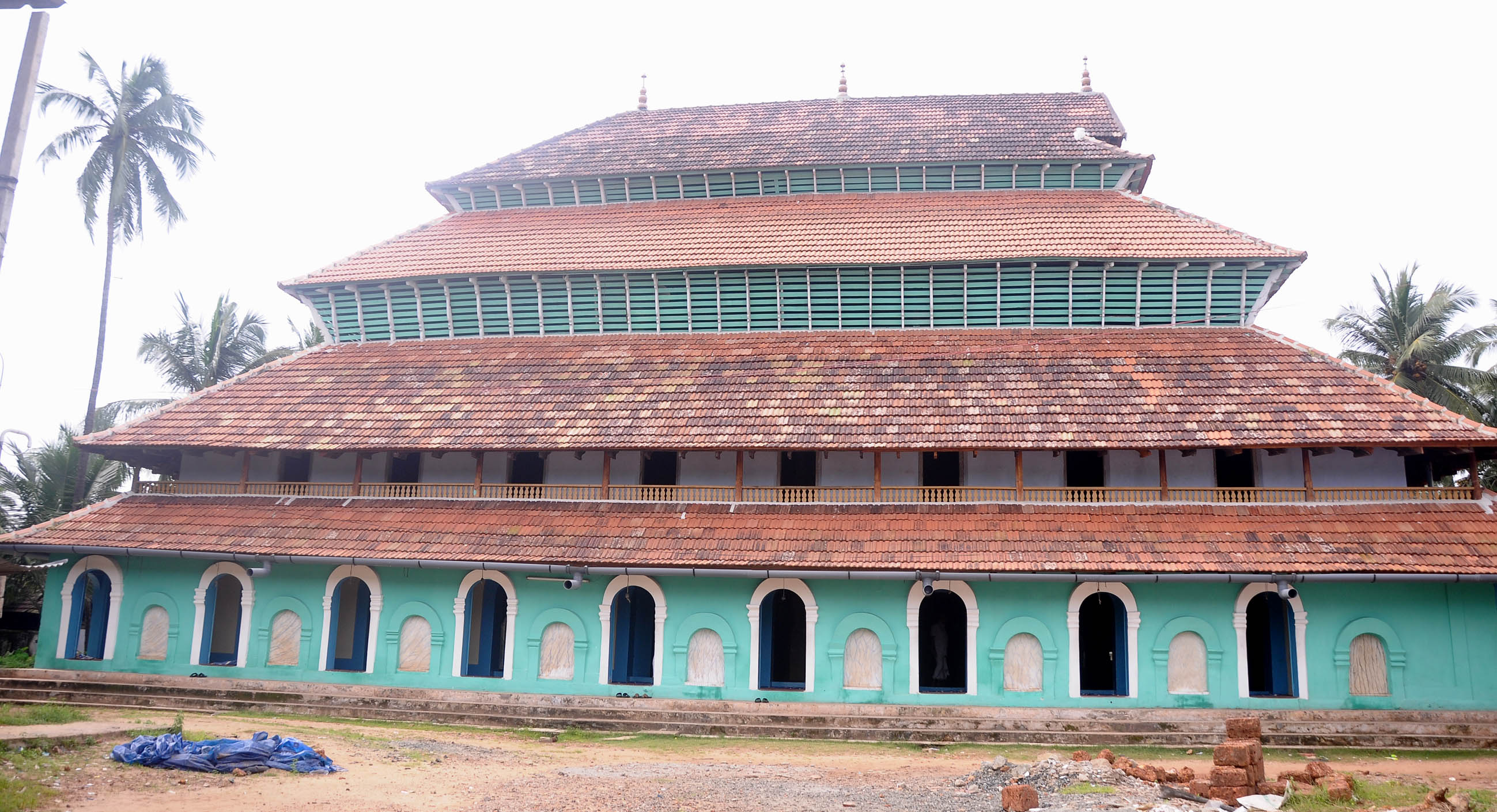
Mishkal Mosque

- Muchundi Mosque
- Kuttichira Juma Masjid:

A historical mosque in Kuttichira, where the grave of Qazi Muhammad - author of Muhiuddin Mala, Fathul Mubin and Khutbatul Jihadiya- is situated.

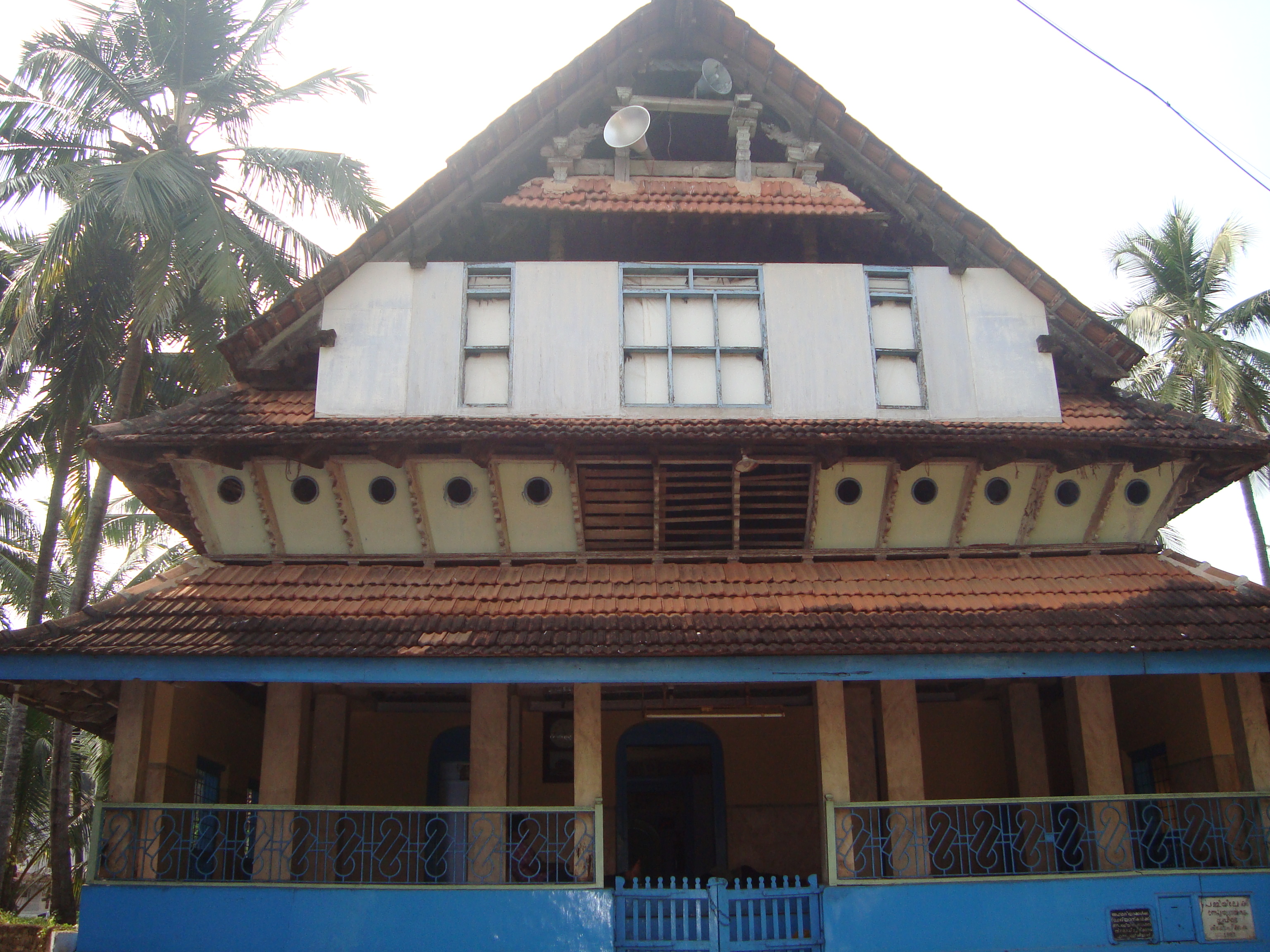
Muchundi Mosque
