= Arabikalyanam =

Practice of temporary marriages

Arabikalyanam (trans: Arabs Marriage) is the practice of temporary marriages between Arabian Muslim men and women from economically disadvantaged communities in Kerala, India. These marriages, facilitated by intermediaries, are often short-lived and stressful to the female partner. The practice of Arabikalyanam, though illegal, continues to persist in varying forms, reflecting systemic failures.

== Historical background ==
The practice of Arabikalyanam was especially prevalent in Kerala's northern districts, including Kozhikode, Malappuram, Kannur, and Kasaragod. With the economic disparity between the Arab world and the Indian subcontinent, many Arabs saw these marriages as temporary arrangements during their stay in India for trade or business. The allure of significant mehar (bridal money) and the absence of dowry demands enticed economically struggling families to consent to such unions. The practice followed the long-standing relation between Arabs and the Mappila Muslims of Malabar, rooted in ancient and medieval trade, fostering a unique cultural and religious fusion, and manifesting in marriages and courtships.

== Contributing factors ==
Poverty among Muslim families in coastal Kerala plays a significant role. The promise of financial aid and a lavish Mehar encouraged parents to marry off their daughters to Arab men. Patriarchal Practices: Religious and cultural norms that endorsed polygamy and child marriages further facilitated these arrangements. Lack of education, limited awareness about rights and the long-term consequences of such marriages left many women vulnerable.

== Characteristics of Arabikalyanam ==
- Short-term Marriages: Many Arab husbands left their brides after a brief period, often during pregnancy, with promises to return that were rarely fulfilled.
- Age Disparity: Girls were frequently married to men much older, creating emotional and cultural dissonance.
- Language Barriers: Communication between spouses was often limited due to linguistic differences, reducing the marriage to a transactional relationship.
- Impact on Women: Many women were left to fend for themselves, often resorting to menial jobs or, in some cases, prostitution, to survive.

== Current situation ==
Numerous cases have been reported in the two decades, shedding light on the grim realities of this practice. The Hindu reported the plight of women caught in such marriages, emphasising how these unions often masquerade as legitimate but ultimately serve as a cover for exploitation. Similarly, Business Standard and India Today highlighted the anguish voiced by women's organizations and the societal stigma faced by victims. Articles in The New Indian Express provided firsthand accounts of such incidents and documented the lack of accountability from perpetrators who frequently abscond to foreign countries.

Indian media delved into the broader implications of these marriages, linking them to systemic issues like poverty, lack of education, and insufficient legal enforcement. Reports also mentioned the complicity of orphanages in facilitating such unions, further complicating efforts to eradicate the practice

The issue has also found representation in Malayalam cinema, which has historically been a medium for social critique. Films such as Surumayitta Kannukal (1983) and Paadam Onnu Oru Vilaapam (2003) offer poignant portrayals of the struggles faced by women trapped in exploitative marriages. These cinematic efforts reflect societal concerns and amplify the call for systemic reform.

The practice of Arabikaalyanam served as a stark reminder of the intersectionality of poverty, gender inequality, and exploitation that prevailed in Kerala till the turn of the century. It led to a concerted effort from the government, civil society, and the community to ensure that the most vulnerable are protected from such predatory practices.
