= Odathil Mosque =

200-year-old mosque in Thalassery, Kerala, South India

- Location of the mosque in Kerala

Religion
- Affiliation: Islam
- Ecclesiastical or organizational status: Mosque
- Status: Active

Location
- Location: Thalassery, Kerala
- Country: India
- Interactive map of Odathil Mosque
- Coordinates: 11°44′55″N 75°29′24″E

Architecture
- Type: Mosque architecture
- Style: Indo-Islamic
- Completed: c. 1806

The Odathil Mosque, also known as the Odathil Palli, is a mosque, located in the city of Thalassery, in the state of Kerala, India. The mosque was built in c. 1806.

.

== See also ==
- Islam in India
- List of mosques in India
- List of mosques in Kerala
