= Mishkal Mosque =

Sunni mosque in Calicut, India

Mishkāl Mosque
- Mishkāl Palli
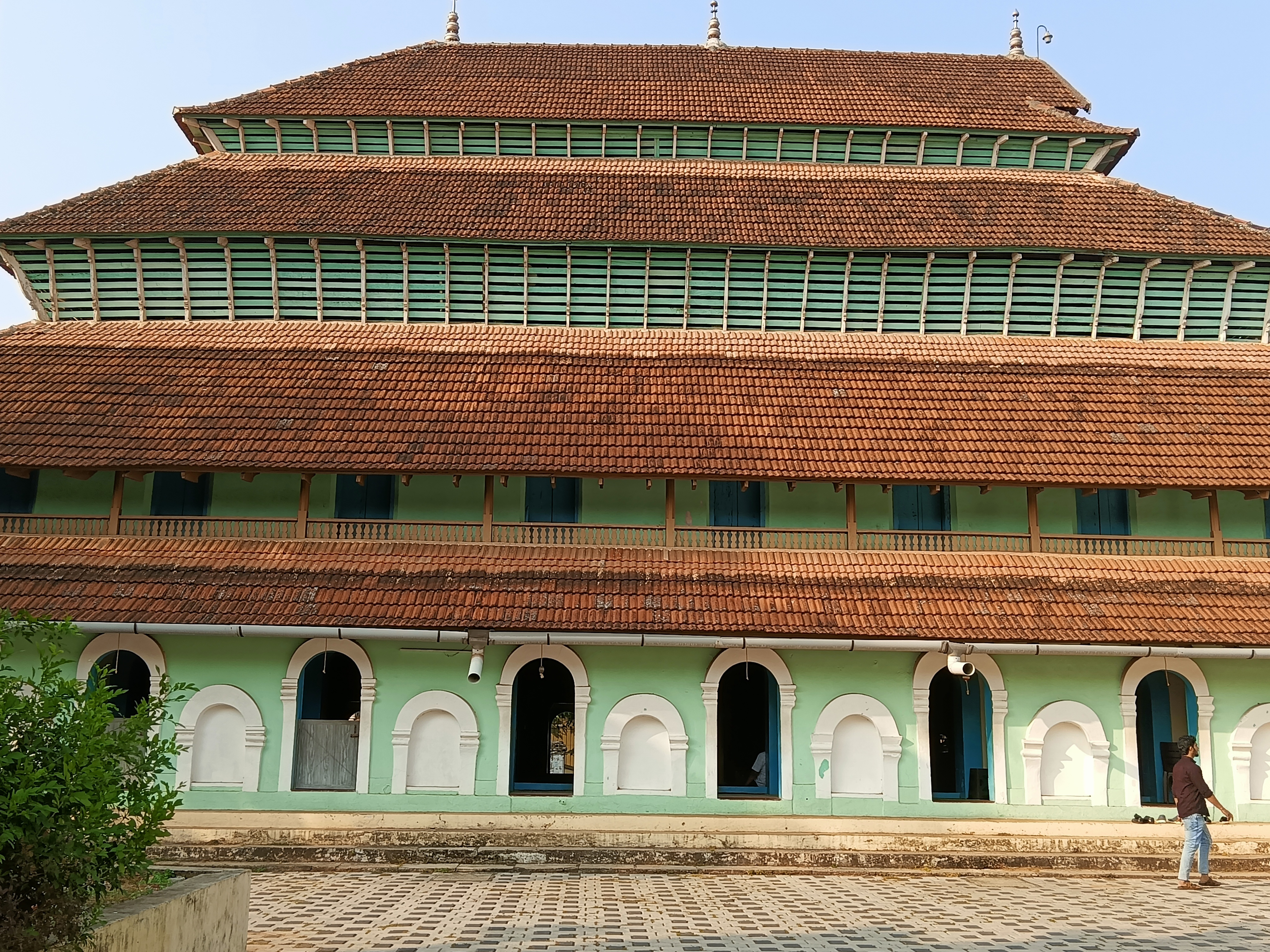
- The mosque, in 2023

- Location of the mosque in Kerala

Religion
- Affiliation: Sunni Islam
- Rite: Šāfiʿī
- Ecclesiastical or organisational status: Mosque
- Status: Active

Location
- Location: Kuttichira, Calicut, Kerala
- Country: India
- Coordinates: 11°15′N 75°46′E

Architecture
- Type: Mosque architecture
- Style: Kerala-Islamic; Vastu shastra
- Founder: Mishkal
- Completed: 14th century (1st structure); 1578 (rebuild)
- Capacity: 400 worshippers

The Mishkal Mosque (Malayalam: മിശ്കാൽ പള്ളി), also spelled Mithqal Mosque is a Šāfiʿī mosque located in Calicut on Malabar Coast, in the state of Kerala, India. The mosque, one of the few surviving medieval mosques in Kerala, is regarded as an important cultural, historical and architectural monument of Kerala.

== Overview ==
The mosque was built in the 14th century by the eponymous Muslim merchant-shipowner (nakhuda). Mishkal, active in Calicut in the 1340s, possessed "great wealth" and a fleet of ships for "the trade with India, China, Yemen, and Persia". Ship-owners known as the nakhudas were among the wealthiest merchants of medieval Indian Ocean world.

Mishkal Mosque is located in Kuttichira neighbourhood, a part of Thekkepuram beach in Calicut; and was built in the Kerala-Islamic traditional Vastu shastra architectural style.

In January 1510, the mosque was partially burned in a Portuguese attack on Calicut by Albuquerque which also occupied the Zamorin's palace. The attack was later repulsed by the Zamorin's Nair troops with 300 to 500 Portuguese killed and the remaining barely even surviving. The top floors of the mosque display some of the damage. The shattered mosque was later renovated and refurbished under Zamorin's supervision. He used to offer land and grant permission for the Muslims to construct worship places or mosques wherever intended. The Muchundi Mosque in Kuttichira till date holds inscriptions on stone that show his financial contribution towards its construction in the thirteenth century.

The Mishkal Mosque originally had five stories. It was rebuilt in 1578/79 after the 1510 arson and now has four stories. Typical for Kerala-Islamic buildings, the mosque has extensive woodwork, and does not have a dome or minarets. A large tank, known as the Kuttichira tank, is adjacent to the mosque. The mosque has 47 doors, 24 carved pillars and a big prayer hall that can accommodate approximately 400 worshippers. The prayer hall is well ventilated and there is a wooden member with intricate motifs.

== Gallery ==
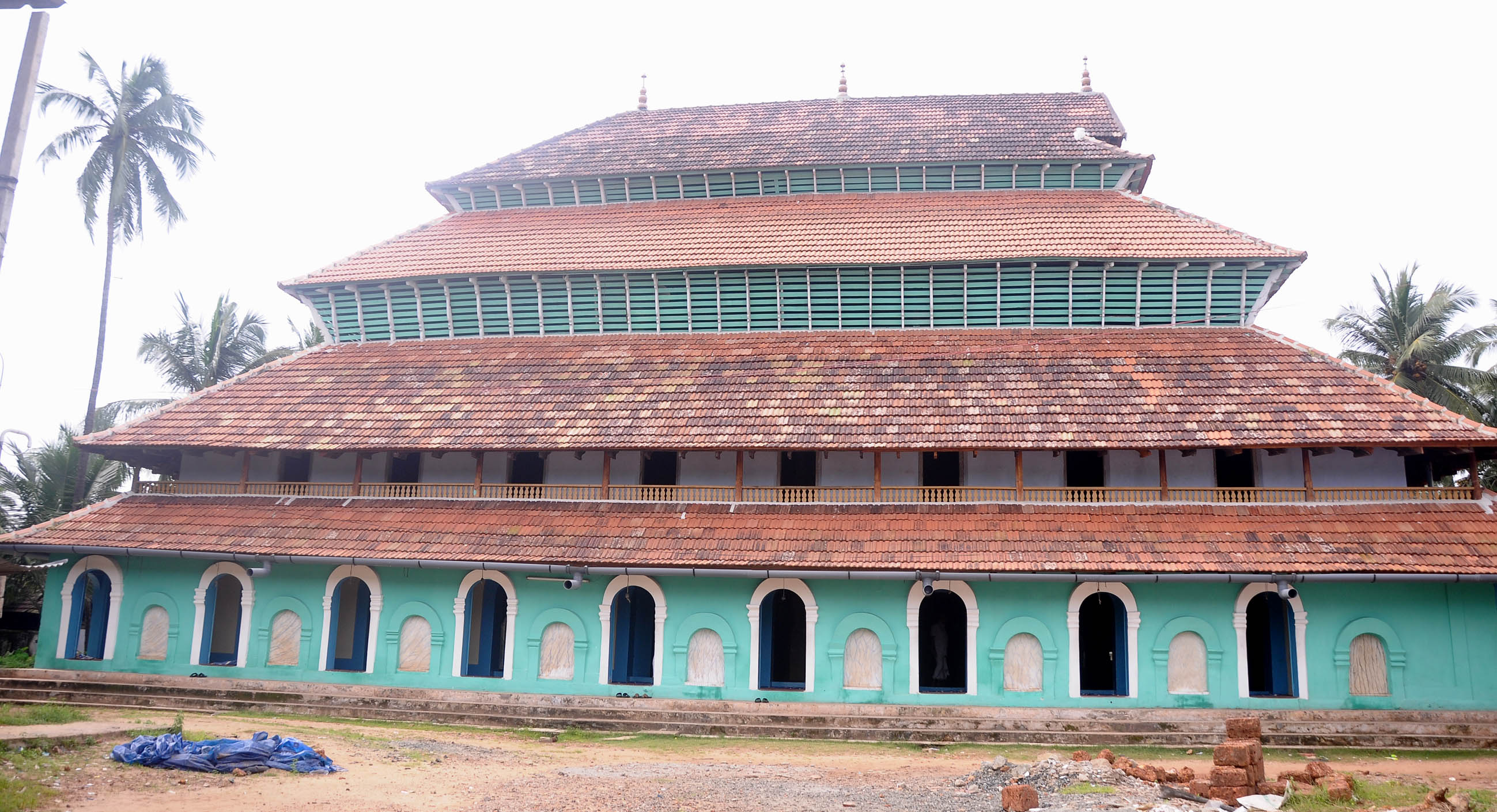
The mosque in 2010, during repairs

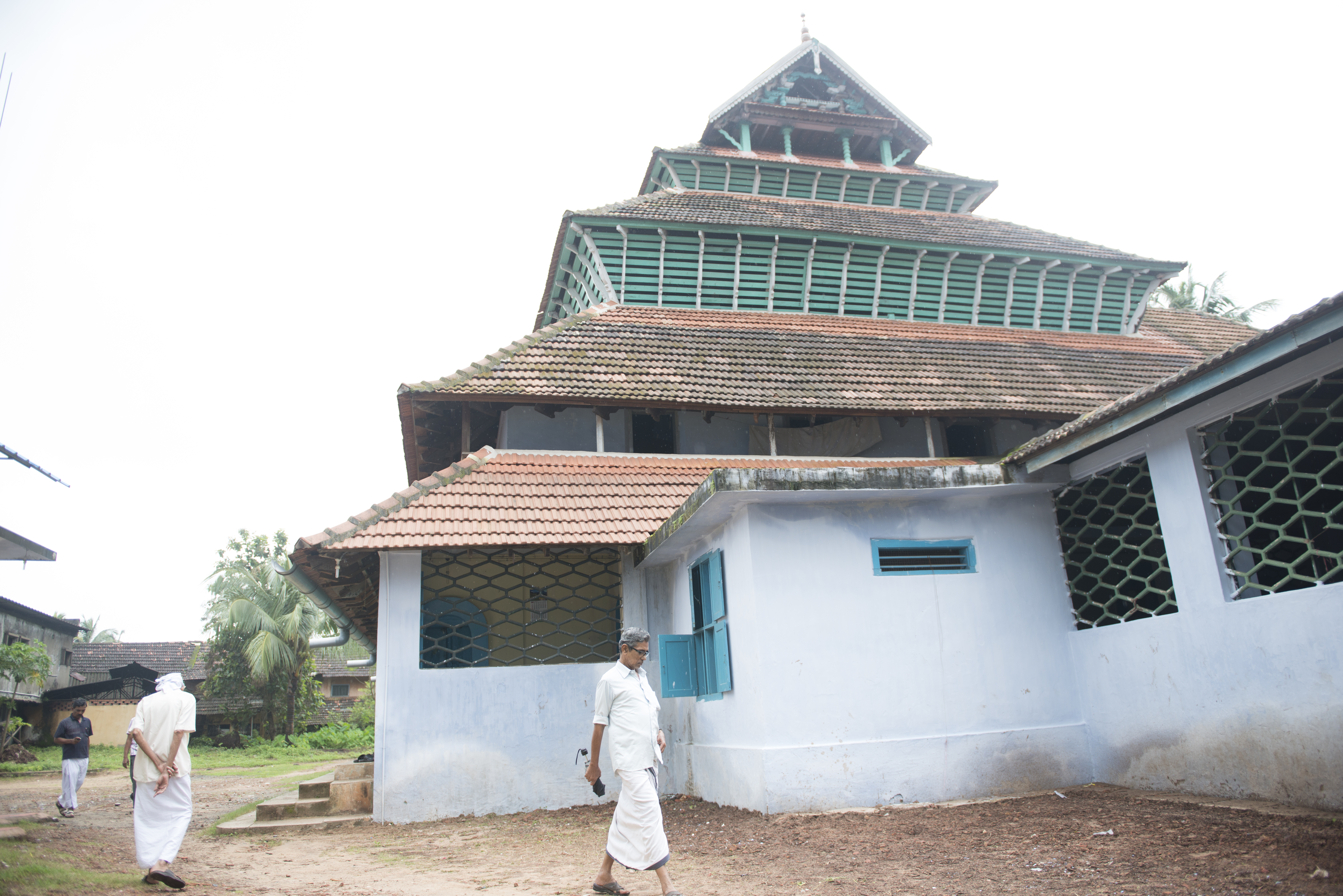
A side view of the mosque

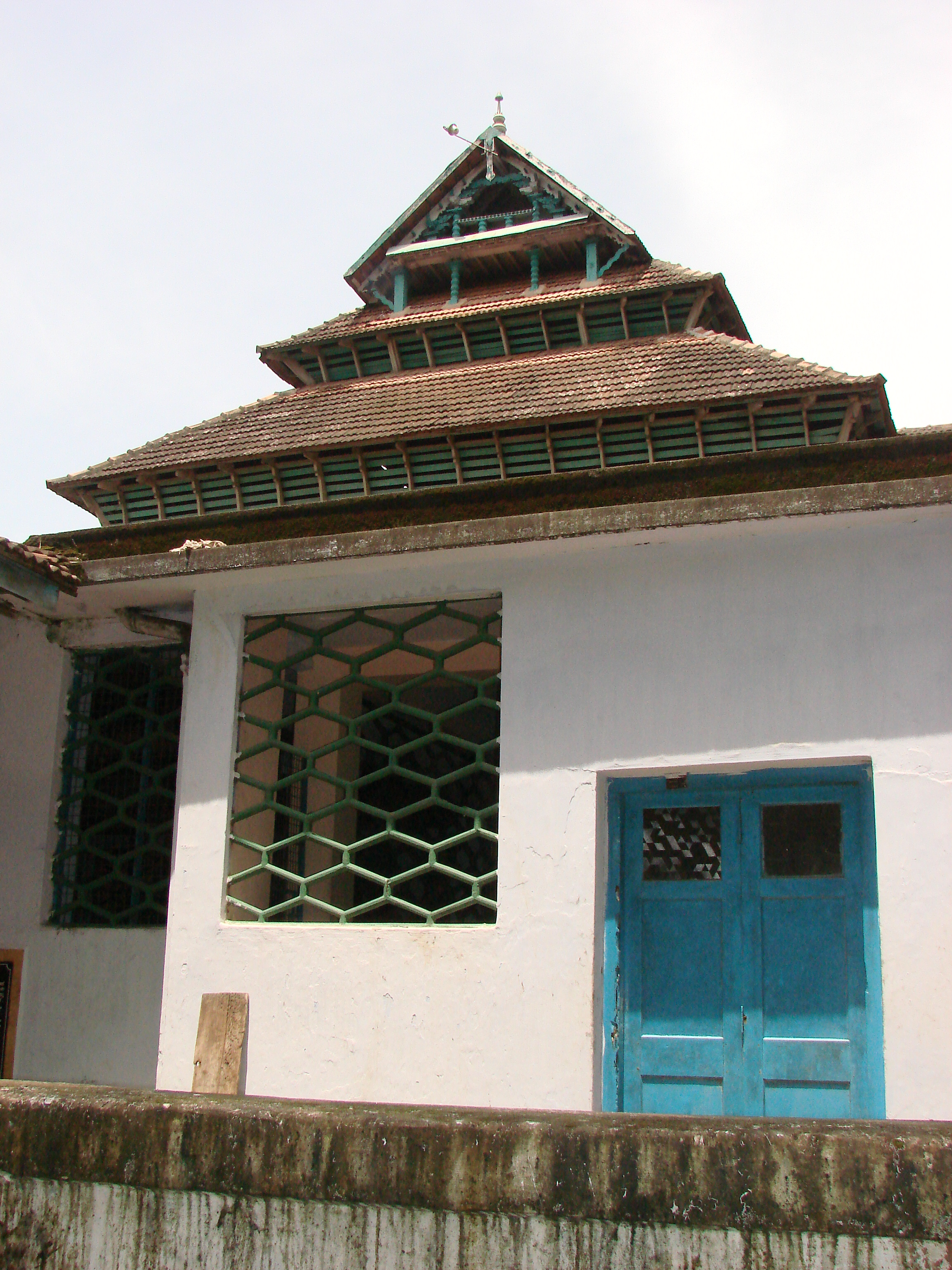
Building detail in 2008

== See also ==
- Islam in India
- List of mosques in India
- List of mosques in Kerala
