= Kadamuri Narasimhaswamy Temple, Kadamuri =

Hindu temple in Kottayam district, Kerala

Kadamuri Narasimhaswamy Temple
- Narasimhaswamy Temple, Kodamuri, Eravuchira, Kottayam, Kerala

Religion
- Affiliation: Hinduism
- District: Kottayam
- Deity: Narasimhaswamy
- Festival: Kumbham Thiruvonam

Location
- Location: Kodamuri, Eravuchira
- State: Kerala
- Country: India
- Interactive map of Kadamuri Narasimhaswamy Temple
- Coordinates: 9°32′00.6″N 76°34′59.6″E

Architecture
- Type: Architecture of Kerala

Specifications
- Temple: One
- Elevation: 33.46 m (110 ft)

Kadamuri Narasimhaswamy Temple is a famous Narasimhaswamy temple in Kerala. It is located at Kadamuri of Kottayam district, in Kerala.

The temple is dedicated to the Narasimha Swamy, an avatar of Bhagwan Vishnu and can be reached easily from Kaithepallam by travelling approximately 1 km on the Kottayam – Karukachal road. The temple's main shrine is oriented towards the west for the convenience of the devotees.
